= List of cities in Qatar =

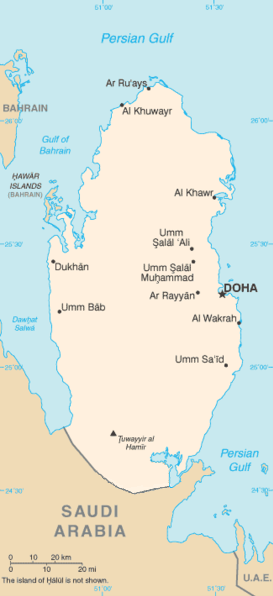
The major cities of Qatar

This is a list of cities and towns in Qatar. Over 60 percent of residents of Qatar live in Doha, the capital.

== Alphabetical list of cities and towns ==
City/district name	Population (2010)	Area (km)	Description
Abu Dhalouf	^{16}	^{16}	Located in the municipality of Al Shamal.
Abu Hamour	^{7}	^{7}	Located in the municipality of Al Rayyan.
Abu Samra	1,065	824.9	Located in the municipality of Al Rayyan.
Ain Khaled	^{7}	^{7}	Located in the municipality of Al Rayyan.
Ain Sinan	^{17}	^{17}	Located in the municipality of Al Shamal.
Al Aziziya	^{1}	^{1}	Located in the municipality of Al Rayyan.
B
Baaya	^{20}	^{20}	Located in the municipality of Al Rayyan.
Bani Hajer	^{3}	^{3}	Located in the municipality of Al Rayyan.
Barahat Al Jufairi	^{9}	^{9}	Located in the municipality of Doha.
Bu Fasseela	^{18}	^{18}	Located in the municipality of Umm Salal.
Bu Samra	^{7}	^{7}	Located in the municipality of Al Rayyan.
Bu Sidra	^{1}	^{1}	Located in the municipality of Al Rayyan.
Al Bidda	1,102	1.2	Located in the municipality of Doha.
D
Dahl Al Hamam	^{25}	^{25}	Located in the municipality of Doha.
Doha International Airport	1,354	34.4	Located in the municipality of Doha.
Doha Port	6	1.5	Located in the municipality of Doha.
Duhail	7,059	6.8	Located in the municipality of Doha.
Dukhan	11,520	365.0	Located in the municipality of Al Rayyan.
Al Daayen	^{2}	^{2}	Located in the municipality of Al Daayen.
Al Dafna	19; ^{10}	1.1; ^{10}	Located in the municipality of Doha.
Ad Dawhah al Jadidah	13,059	0.5	Located in the municipality of Doha.
E
Al Ebb	^{2}	^{2}	Located in the municipality of Al Daayen.
Al Egla	^{6}	^{6}	Located in the municipality of Doha.
F
Fuwayrit	^{17}	^{17}	Located in the municipality of Al Shamal.
Fereej Abdel Aziz	10,808	0.5	Located in the municipality of Doha.
Fereej Bin Durham	^{24}	^{24}	Located in the municipality of Doha.
Fereej Bin Mahmoud	24,172	1.8	Located in the municipality of Doha.
Fereej Bin Omran	^{26}	^{26}	Located in the municipality of Doha.
Fereej Kulaib	7,702	1.1	Located in the municipality of Doha.
Fereej Mohammed Bin Jassim	^{21}	^{21}	Located in the municipality of Doha.
Fereej Al Amir	^{20}	^{20}	Located in the municipality of Al Rayyan.
Fereej Al Asiri	^{7}	^{7}	Located in the municipality of Al Rayyan.
Fereej Al Asmakh	^{9}	^{9}	Located in the municipality of Doha.
Fereej Al Murra	^{1}	^{1}	Located in the municipality of Al Rayyan.
Fereej Al Manaseer	^{1}	^{1}	Located in the municipality of Al Rayyan.
Fereej Al Nasr	^{13}	^{13}	Located in the municipality of Doha.
Fereej Al Soudan	^{1}; ^{20}	^{1}; ^{20}	Located in the municipality of Al Rayyan.
Fereej Al Zaeem	^{19}	^{19}	Located in the municipality of Al Rayyan.
G
Gharrafat Al Rayyan	^{3}	^{3}	Located in the municipality of Al Rayyan.
Al Gharrafa	^{3}	^{3}	Located in the municipality of Al Rayyan.
Al Ghuwariyah	4,834	628.6	Located in the municipality of Al Khor.
H
Hamad Medical City	^{26}	^{26}	Located in the municipality of Doha.
Hazm Al Markhiya	5,586	4.2	Located in the municipality of Doha.
Al Hilal	11,257	1.8	Located in the municipality of Doha.
I
Industrial Area	261,401	32.1	Located in the municipality of Doha.
Izghawa (Al Rayyan)	^{3}	^{3}	Located in the municipality of Al Rayyan.
Izghawa (Umm Salal)	^{18}	^{18}	Located in the municipality of Umm Salal.
J
Jabal Thuaileb	^{6}	^{6}	Located in the municipality of Doha.
Jelaiah	^{13}	^{13}	Located in the municipality of Doha.
Jeryan Jenaihat	^{2}	^{2}	Located in the municipality of Al Daayen.
Jeryan Nejaima	^{13}	^{13}	Located in the municipality of Doha.
Al Jasrah	240	0.4	Located in the municipality of Doha.
Al Jeryan	^{4}	^{4}	Located in the municipality of Al Khor.
K
Khor Al Adaid	42	686.3	Located in the municipality of Al Wakrah.
Al Karaana	3,375	551.7	Located in the municipality of Al Wakrah.
Al Kharrara	117	832.3	Located in the municipality of Al Wakrah.
Al Kharaitiyat	^{18}	^{18}	Located in the municipality of Umm Salal.
Al Kharayej	^{6}	^{6}	Located in the municipality of Doha.
Al Kheesa	^{2}	^{2}	Located in the municipality of Al Daayen.
Al Khor	^{4}	^{4}	Located in the municipality of Al Khor.
Al Khulaifat	^{5}	^{5}	Located in the municipality of Doha.
L
Leabaib	^{2}	^{2}	Located in the municipality of Al Daayen.
Lebday	^{19}	^{19}	Located in the municipality of Al Rayyan.
Lejbailat	4,024	1.4	Located in the municipality of Doha.
Lekhwair	3	0.7	Located in the municipality of Doha.
Leqtaifiya (West Bay Lagoon)	^{11}	^{11}	Located in the municipality of Doha.
Lijmiliya	1,706	626.2	Located in the municipality of Al Rayyan.
Luaib	^{20}	^{20}	Located in the municipality of Al Rayyan.
Lusail	^{6}	^{6}	Located in the municipality of Al Daayen.
Al Luqta	^{19}	^{19}	Located in the municipality of Al Rayyan.
M
Madinat ash Shamal	^{12}	^{12}	Located in the municipality of Al Shamal.
Madinat Al Kaaban	^{17}	^{17}	Located in the municipality of Al Shamal.
Madinat Khalifa North	^{25}	^{25}	Located in the municipality of Doha.
Madinat Khalifa South	35,125	2.6	Located in the municipality of Doha.
Mebaireek	11,333	198.6	Located in the municipality of Al Rayyan.
Mehairja	^{20}	^{20}	Located in the municipality of Al Rayyan.
Mesaieed	35,150	154.7	Located in the municipality of Al Wakrah.
Mesaieed Industrial Area	123	60.9	Located in the municipality of Al Wakrah.
Mesaimeer	^{7}	^{7}	Located in the municipality of Al Rayyan.
Al Messila	4,716	2.1	Located in the municipality of Doha.
Muaither	^{1}; ^{15}	^{1}; ^{15}	Located in the municipality of Al Rayyan.
Muraikh	^{20}	^{20}	Located in the municipality of Al Rayyan.
Mushayrib	22,711; ^{21}	1.0; ^{21}	Located in the municipality of Doha.
Al Mamoura	^{7}	^{7}	Located in the municipality of Al Rayyan.
Al Mansoura	^{24}	^{24}	Located in the municipality of Doha.
Al Markhiyah	5,197	2.7	Located in the municipality of Doha.
Al Mashaf	^{8}	^{8}	Located in the municipality of Al Wakrah.
Al Masrouhiya	^{2}	^{2}	Located in the municipality of Al Daayen.
Al Mearad	^{1}	^{1}	Located in the municipality of Doha.
Al Mirqab	^{23}	^{23}	Located in the municipality of Doha.
N
Najma	24,763	1.1	Located in the municipality of Doha.
New Al Hitmi	^{26}	^{26}	Located in the municipality of Doha.
New Al Mirqab	^{13}	^{13}	Located in the municipality of Doha.
New Al Rayyan	^{15}	^{15}	Located in the municipality of Al Rayyan.
New Salata	15,114	3.5	Located in the municipality of Doha.
New Fereej Al Ghanim	^{1}	^{1}	Located in the municipality of Al Rayyan.
New Fereej Al Khulaifat	^{7}	^{7}	Located in the municipality of Al Rayyan.
Nu`ayjah	29,703	6.3	Located in the municipality of Doha.
Al Najada	^{9}	^{9}	Located in the municipality of Doha.
Al Nasraniya	1,043	423.2	Located in the municipality of Al Rayyan.
O
Old Airport	44,275	4.7	Located in the municipality of Doha.
Old Al Ghanim	3,462	0.3	Located in the municipality of Doha.
Old Al Hitmi	^{22}	^{22}	Located in the municipality of Doha.
Old Al Rayyan	^{19}	^{19}	Located in the municipality of Al Rayyan.
Onaiza	12,880; ^{11}	4.1; ^{11}	Located in the municipality of Doha.
P
The Pearl	12,000 (2015)	32.0	Located in the municipality of Doha.
Q
Al Qassar	^{10}; ^{11}	^{10}; ^{11}	Located in the municipality of Doha.
R
Ras Abu Aboud	0; ^{5}	3.2; ^{5}	Located in the municipality of Doha.
Ras Lafan	^{14}	^{14}	Located in the municipality of Al Khor.
Rawdat Al Hamama	^{2}	^{2}	Located in the municipality of Al Daayen.
Rawdat Al Khail	17,219	1.7	Located in the municipality of Doha.
Rawdat Egdaim	^{3}	^{3}	Located in the municipality of Al Rayyan.
Rawdat Rashed	6,046	454.1	Located in the municipality of Al Rayyan.
Rumeilah	1,595	1.7	Located in the municipality of Doha.
Ar Ru'ays	^{12}	^{12}	Located in the municipality of Al Shamal.
Al Rufaa	^{22}	^{22}	Located in the municipality of Doha.
S
Sawda Natheel	15	569.8	Located in the municipality of Al Rayyan.
Shagra	3,874	497.6	Located in the municipality of Al Wakrah.
Simaisma	^{4}	^{4}	Located in the municipality of Al Khor.
Al Sadd	14,113; ^{13}	3.5; ^{13}	Located in the municipality of Doha.
As Salatah	^{23}	^{23}	Located in the municipality of Doha.
Al Sailiya	^{1}	^{1}	Located in the municipality of Al Rayyan.
Al Sakhama	^{2}	^{2}	Located in the municipality of Al Daayen.
Al Shagub	^{19}	^{19}	Located in the municipality of Al Rayyan.
Al-Shahaniya	35,393	287.2	Located in the municipality of Al Rayyan.
Al Souq	679	0.3	Located in the municipality of Doha.
Al Seej	^{3}	^{3}	Located in the municipality of Doha.
T
Al Tarfa	^{13}	^{13}	Located in the municipality of Doha.
Al Thakhira	^{14}	^{14}	Located in the municipality of Al Khor.
Al Themaid	^{3}	^{3}	Located in the municipality of Al Rayyan.
Al Thumama (Doha)	16,696	7.0	Located in the municipality of Doha.
Al Thumama (Al Wakrah)	^{8}	^{8}	Located in the municipality of Al Wakrah.
U
Umm Bab	6,194	495.2	Located in the municipality of Al Rayyan.
Umm Birka	^{14}	^{14}	Located in the municipality of Al Khor.
Umm Ghuwailina	26,069	1.4	Located in the municipality of Doha.
Umm Lekhba	9,871	3.1	Located in the municipality of Doha.
Umm Qarn	^{2}	^{2}	Located in the municipality of Al Daayen.
Umm Salal Ali	^{18}	^{18}	Located in the municipality of Umm Salal.
Umm Salal Mohammed	^{18}	^{18}	Located in the municipality of Umm Salal.
Al Utouriya	1,060	648.5	Located in the municipality of Al Rayyan.
W
Wadi Al Banat	^{6}	^{6}	Located in the municipality of Doha.
Wadi Al Sail	547	2.2	Located in the municipality of Doha.
Wadi Al Wasaah	^{2}	^{2}	Located in the municipality of Al Daayen.
Wadi Lusail	^{2}	^{2}	Located in the municipality of Al Daayen.
Al Waab	^{1}	^{1}	Located in the municipality of Al Rayyan.
Al Wajba	^{15}	^{15}	Located in the municipality of Al Rayyan.
Al Wakrah	79,457	66.3	Located in the municipality of Al Wakrah.
Al Wukair	^{8}	^{8}	Located in the municipality of Al Wakrah.
Z
Al Zubarah	^{16}	^{16}	Located in the municipality of Al Shamal.

=== Footnotes ===
1. Population: 138,573; area: 1,541.1 km; includes Fereej Al Soudan, Al Waab, Al Aziziya, New Fereej Al Ghanim, Fereej Al Murra, Fereej Al Manaseer, Bu Sidra, Muaither, Al Sailiya and Al Mearad.

2. Population: 24,722; area: 167.1 km; includes Leabaib, Al Ebb, Jeryan Jenaihat, Al Kheesa, Rawdat Al Hamama, Wadi Al Wasaah, Al Sakhama, Al Masrouhiya, Wadi Lusail, Umm Qarn and Al Daayen.

3. Population: 46,976; area: 80.6 km; includes Al Gharrafa, Gharrafat Al Rayyan, Izghawa, Bani Hajer, Al Seej, Rawdat Egdaim, and Al Themaid.

4. Population: 80,220; area: 459.0 km; includes Simaisma, Al Jeryan, Al Khor.

5. Population: 1,868; area: 0.9 km; includes Al Khulaifat and Ras Abu Aboud.

6. Population: 1,213; area: 36.0 km; includes Jabal Thuaileb, Al Kharayej, Lusail, Al Egla, and Wadi Al Banat.

7. Population: 85,906; area: 64.9 km; includes Fereej Al Asiri, New Fereej Al Khulaifat, Bu Samra, Al Mamoura, Abu Hamour, Mesaimeer and Ain Khaled.

8. Population: 22,459; area: 219.8 km; includes Al Thumama, Al Wukair, and Al Mashaf.

9. Population: 4,138; area: 0.2 km; includes Al Najada, Barahat Al Jufairi, and Fereej Al Asmakh.

10. Population: 2,782; area: 4.1 km; includes Al Qassar and Al Dafna.

11. Population: 22,168; area: 25.4 km; includes Leqtaifiya, Onaiza and Al Qassar.

12. Population: 4,996; area: 166.6 km; includes Madinat ash Shamal and Ar Ru'ays.

13. Population: 15,184; area: 2.7 km; includes Al Sadd, New Al Mirqab and Fereej Al Nasr.

13. Population: 5,558; area: 9.7 km; includes Jelaiah, Al Tarfa and Jeryan Nejaima.

14. Population: 128,574; area: 550.5 km; includes Al Thakhira, Ras Lafan, and Umm Birka.

15. Population: 76,291; area: 103.3 km; includes New Al Rayyan, Al Wajba, and Muaither.

16. Population: 1,009; area: 427.2 km; includes Al Zubarah and Abu Dhalouf.

17. Population: 1,970; area: 307.3 km; includes Fuwayrit, Ain Sinan and Madinat Al Kaaban.

18. Population: 60,509; area: 317.9 km; includes Al Kharaitiyat, Izghawa, Umm Salal Ali, Umm Salal Mohammed and Bu Fasseela.

19. Population: 20,416; area: 13.4 km; includes Al Luqta, Lebday, Old Al Rayyan, Al Shagub and Fereej Al Zaeem.

20. Population: 23,591; area: 18.1 km; includes Fereej Al Amir, Luaib, Muraikh, Baaya, Mehairja and Fereej Al Soudan.

21. Population: 4,886; area: 0.4 km; includes Fereej Mohammed bin Jassim and Mushayrib.

22. Population: 7,125; area: 0.5 km; includes Al Rufaa and Old Al Hitmi.

23. Population: 741; area: 0.5 km; includes As Salatah and Al Mirqab.

24. Population: 31,573; area: 1.5 km; includes Al Mansoura and Fereej Bin Durham.

25. Population: 14,725; area: 2.4 km; includes Madinat Khalifa North and Dahl Al Hamam.

26. Population: 21,066; area: 2.5 km; includes Fereej Bin Omran, New Al Hitmi and Hamad Medical City.

== See also ==
- Municipalities of Qatar
