= New Fereej Al Ghanim =

New Fereej Al Ghanim فريج الغانم الجديد
- District
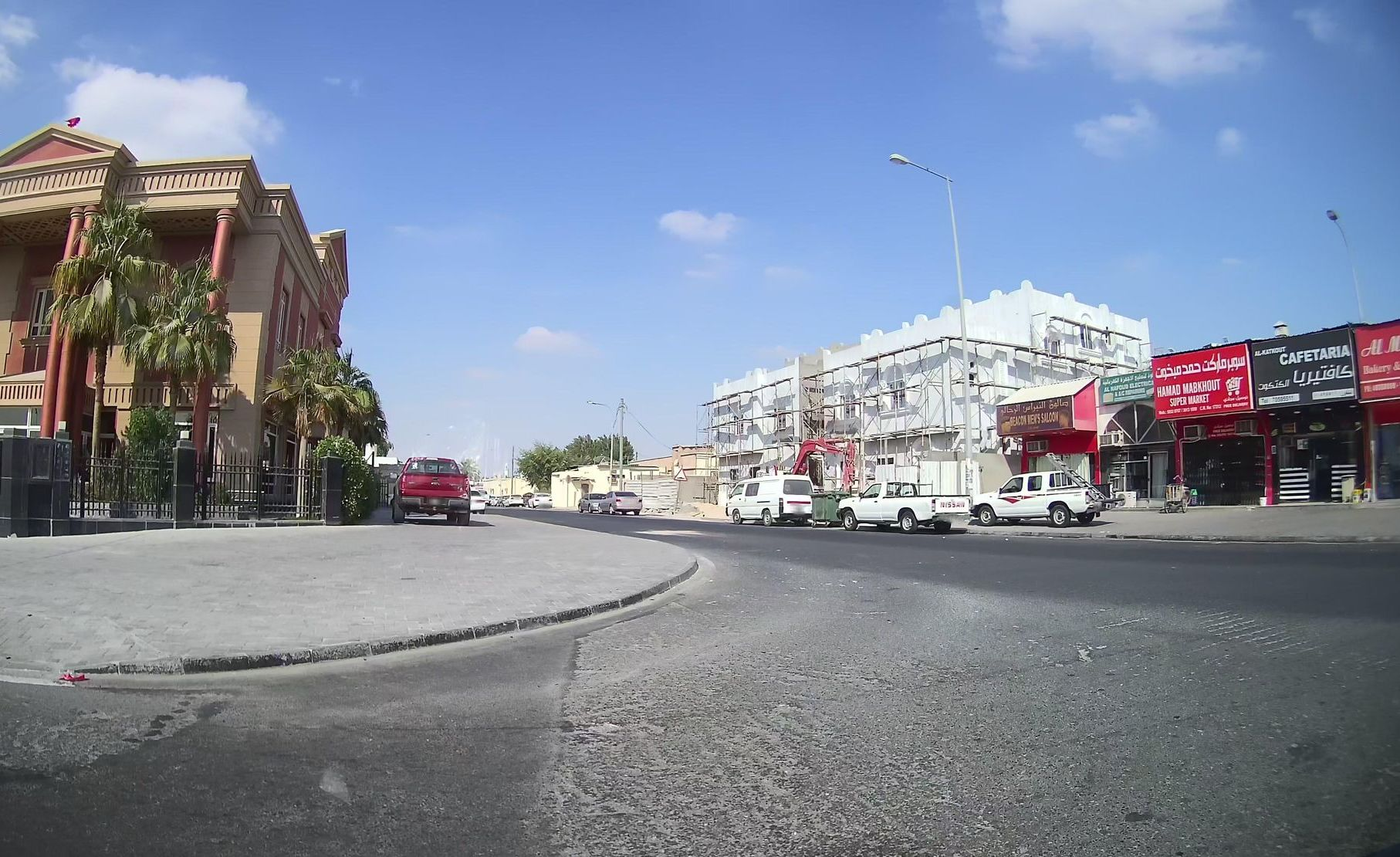
- Shops on Al Ghanim Al Rufaa Al Street in New Fereej Al Ghanim

- Location within Qatar
- Coordinates: 25°14′35″N 51°27′09″E
- Country: Qatar
- Municipality: Al Rayyan
- Zone: Zone 55
- District no.: 85

Area
  - Total: 0.6 km^{2} (0.23 sq mi)
- Elevation: 26 m (85 ft)

New Fereej Al Ghanim (Arabic: فريج الغانم الجديد, romanized: Farīq al Ghānim al Jadīd; also referred to as Fereej Al Ghanim Al Jadeed) is a district in Qatar, located in the municipality of Al Rayyan.

In the 2015 census, it was listed as a district of Zone 55, which has a population of 283,675 and also includes Bu Sidra, Al Aziziya, Al Waab, Fereej Al Soudan, Muaither, Al Mearad, Fereej Al Manaseer, Fereej Al Murra and Al Sailiya.

It borders Al Aziziya to the north and east and Fereej Al Murra to the west.

== Transport ==
Currently, the elevated New Al Ghanim Metro Station is under construction, having been launched during Phase 2C. Once completed, it will be part of Doha Metro's Gold Line.
