= 2015 Qatari municipal elections =

Municipal elections in Qatar were held for the fifth time on 13 May 2015. Five women contested the polls as candidates. Two women were elected to the Central Municipal Council (CMC) after winning their constituencies, heralding the first time two women have occupied seats in the council. This round of elections witnessed the merging of a number of depopulated constituencies and the addition of several new constituencies.

Early indications suggested that the voter turnout would be low. However, the voter turnout in various constituencies ranged from 51% to 87%, with an overall voter turnout of 70%. This was a marked increase from the 43% voter turnout in the 2011 elections. The total number of voters was 21,735. There were 109 candidates.

== Background ==
According to government officials, 136 candidates signed up to run. Twenty-five candidates withdrew from the elections before the onset of voting, including three candidates who withdrew on 12 May. This resulted in the contention of three constituencies (1, 27, and 28) by single candidates who were declared winners by acclamation one day prior to ballots being cast. Constituency numbers 4, 9, 21, 22, 24 and 26 were contested by two candidates each. Conversely, constituency numbers 10, 11, 13, 18, 19 and 20 were vied for by six candidates apiece.

Only 5 female candidates ran for election. This invigorated discussion on the possible establishment of a quota for female candidates.

== Results ==
Constituency		Electee
1	Al Markhiya	Jassim Abdullah Jassim Al Maleki
2	West Bay	Saeed Rashid Saeed Al-Hajiri
3	Madinat Khalifa North	Hamad Khalid Khalifa Al Kubaisi
4	Madinat Khalifa South	Khalid Abdullah Issa Ahmed Al Hitmi
5	Muraikh	Mohamed Salem Mohamed Al Marri
6	Al Aziziya	Hamad Khalid Ahmed Mohamed Al Ghanim
7	Muntaza	Abdullah Saeed Abdullah Khamis Al Sulaiti
8	Old Airport	Sheikha Yousuf Hasan Al Jufairi
9	Al Thumama	Fatima Ahmed Khalfan Al Jaham Al Kuwari
10	Al Mamoura	Abdurrahman Abdullah Mohamed Ali Al Khulaifi
11	Mesaimeer	Abdullah Salim Saeed Saad Khuwar
12	Muaither	Mohamed Ali Mohamed Al Hamar Al Azba
13	Fereej Al Murra	Mohamed Hamad Mohamed Al A'ttan Al Marri
14	New Al Rayyan	Mohamed Mahmoud Shafi Al Shafi
15	Al Gharrafa	Mubarak Feraish Mubarak Saleh Al Salim
16	Bani Hajer	Mohamed Saleh Rashid Al Khayareen Al Hajiri
17	Al Kharaitiyat	Ali Nasser Issa Al Kaabi
18	Al Sakhama	Mishal Abdullah Saqr Thiyab Al Nuaimi
19	Umm Salal Mohammed	Hamad Hadi Hamad Al Buraidi Al Marri
20	Al Wakrah	Mansour Ahmed Yousuf Mohamed Al Khater
21	Salwa Road	Nayef Ali Mohamed Al Ahbabi
22	Rawdat Rashed	Khalid Abdullah Mohamed Al Ghali Al Marri
23	Al-Shahaniya	Mohamed Zafer Mohamed Al Mefgae Al Hajiri
24	Al Jemailiya	Mohamed Faisal Mubarak Al Ajab Al Shahwani
25	Al Khor	Nasser Ibrahim Mohamed Issa Al Mohannadi
26	Al Thakhira	Mohamed Lahdan Ali Abu Jamhoor Al Mohannadi
27	Madinat Al Kaaban	Rabia Hamad Ajlan Al Ajlan Al Kaabi
28	Al Ghuwariyah	Saeed Mubara Saeed Ali Al Rashidi
29	Ar Ru'ays	Nasser Hassan Dandoun Al Kubaisi
