= Bu Sidra =

Bu Sidra بوسدرة
- District
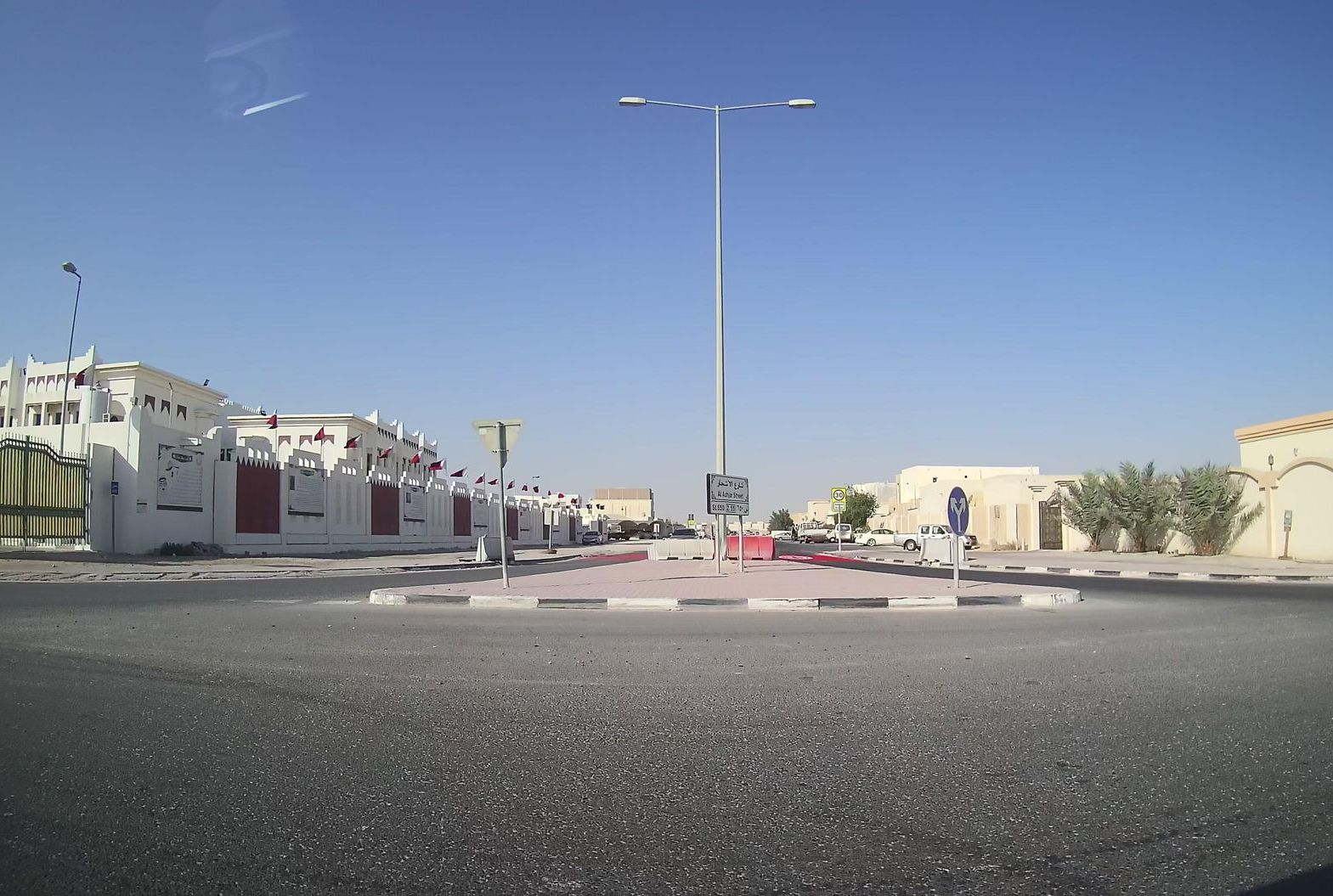
- Al Ashjar Street in Bu Sidra

- Location within Qatar
- Coordinates: 25.2367°N 51.4054°E
- Country: Qatar
- Municipality: Al Rayyan
- Zone: Zone 55
- District no.: 89

Area
  - Total: 9.2 km^{2} (3.6 sq mi)
- Elevation: 23 m (75 ft)

Bu Sidra (Arabic: بوسدرة; also spelled Abu Sidra) is a district in Qatar, located in the municipality of Al Rayyan.

In the 2015 census, it was listed as a district of Zone No. 55 which has a population of 283,675 and also includes New Fereej Al Ghanim, Al Aziziya, Al Waab, Fereej Al Soudan, Muaither, Al Mearad, Fereej Al Manaseer, Fereej Al Murra and Al Sailiya.

Fereej Al Manaseer is located to the immediate east.

== Etymology ==
The first part of the district's name, abu, translates to "father" in Arabic and is used as a prefix for geographical features. Sidra refers to the sidr tree (Ziziphus nummularia), which grows abundantly in the area.

== Infrastructure ==
Ashghal (the Public Works Authority) launched a QR 2.6 million project to construct a religious complex in Bu Sidra in November 2013. Maha Al Khaleej for Contracting Co. was selected as the contractor. As part of the project, a 200 worshipper capacity mosque, an imam's house and an ablution block were constructed.

== Education ==
The following schools are located in Bu Sidra:

Name of School	Curriculum	Grade	Genders	Ref
Al Mothanna Bin Haritha Model Independent	Independent	Primary	Male-only	
Al Taawon Independent Kindergarten for Girls	Independent	Kindergarten	Female-only	
Othman Bin Affan Model Independent Boys	Independent	Primary	Male-only	
