= Fereej Al Manaseer =

Fereej Al Manaseer فريج المناصير
- District
- Location within Qatar
- Coordinates: 25.248926°N 51.428451°E
- Country: Qatar
- Municipality: Al Rayyan
- Zone: Zone 55
- District no.: 87

Area
  - Total: 0.3 km^{2} (0.12 sq mi)
- Elevation: 22 m (72 ft)

Fereej Al Manaseer (Arabic: فريج المناصير) is a district in Qatar, located in the municipality of Al Rayyan.

In the 2015 census, it was listed as a district of Zone 55 which has a population of 283,675 and also includes Bu Sidra, Al Aziziya, Al Waab, Fereej Al Soudan, Muaither, Al Mearad, New Fereej Al Ghanim, Fereej Al Murra and Al Sailiya.

== Geography ==
It borders Bu Sidra to the south, Al Aziziya to the east, Baaya to the north and Muaither to the north and west.

== Transport ==
Currently, the underground Al Manaseer Metro Station is under construction. Once completed, it will be part of Doha Metro's Gold Line. Construction was launched during Phase 2A.

== Education ==
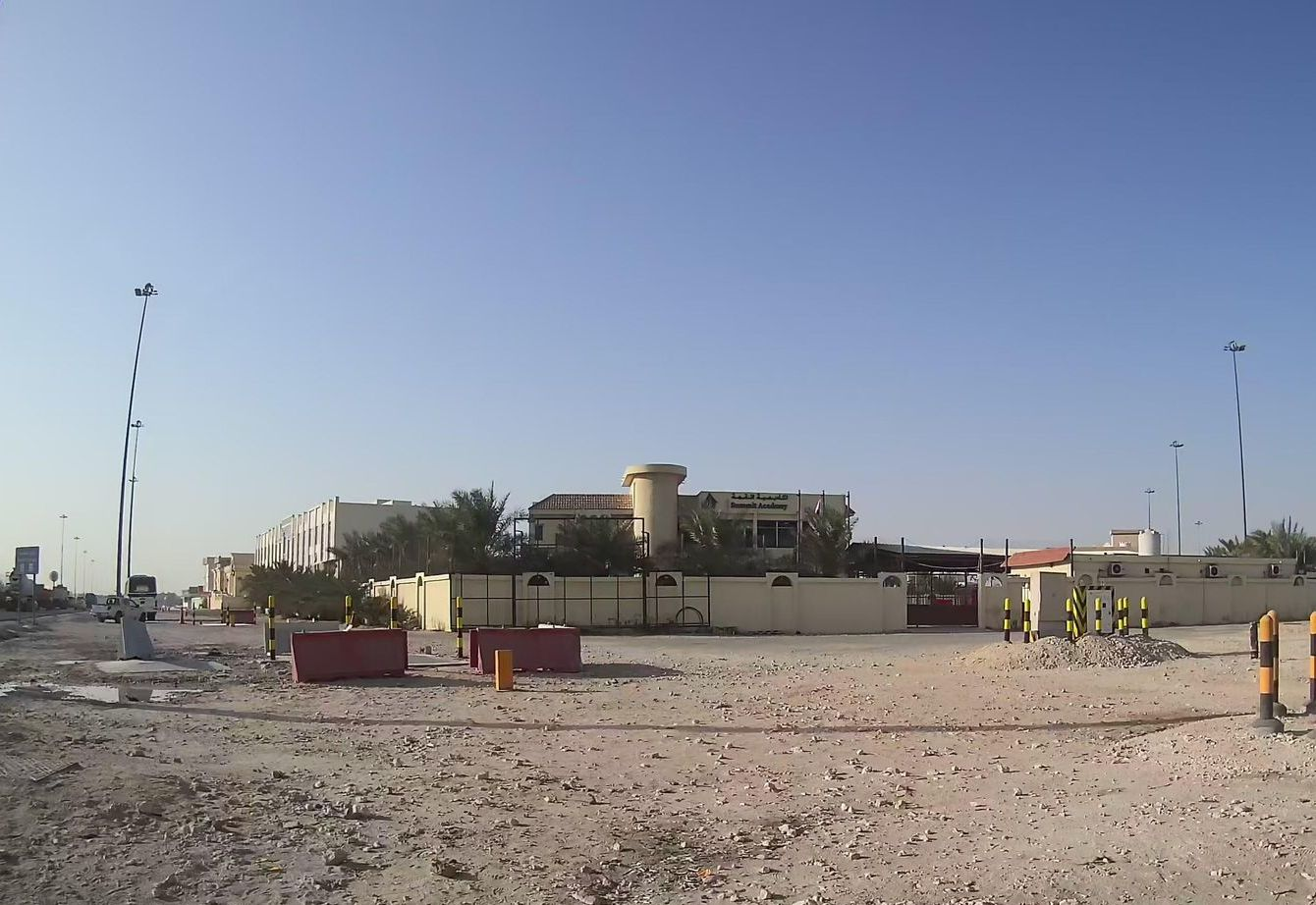
Summit Academy on Al Furousiya Street in Fereej Al Manaseer

The following school is located in Fereej Al Manaseer:

| Name of School | Curriculum | Grade | Genders | Official Website | Ref |
|---|---|---|---|---|---|
| Summit Academy | American | Primary | Mixed | N/A | |

== Landmarks ==
- Fereej Al Manaseer Park on Al Hummaid Street.
