= Zone 55, Qatar =

Zone 55
- Zone
- Interactive map of Zone 55
- Coordinates: 25.224782°N 51.398876°E
- Country: Qatar
- Municipality: Al Rayyan
- Blocks: 342

Area
  - Total: 82.4 km^{2} (31.8 sq mi)

Population
  - Total: 283,675 (2,015)
- Time zone: UTC+03 (Arabia Standard Time)
- ISO 3166 code: QA-RA

Zone 55 is a zone of the municipality of Al Rayyan in the state of Qatar. The main districts recorded in the 2015 population census were Fereej Al Soudan, Al Waab, Al Aziziya, New Fereej Al Ghanim, Fereej Al Murra, Fereej Al Manaseer, Bu Sidra, Muaither, Al Sailiya, and Al Mearad.

== Demographics ==
Year	Population
1986	20,106
1997	41,033
2004	61,712
2010	138,573
2015	283,675

== Land use ==
The Ministry of Municipality and Environment (MME) breaks down land use in the zone as follows.

Area (km^{2})	Developed land (km^{2})	Undeveloped land (km^{2})	Residential (km^{2})	Commercial/ Industrial (km^{2})	Education/ Health (km^{2})	Farming/ Green areas (km^{2})	Other uses (km^{2})
82.39	52.43	29.96	14.74	0.63	1.00	9.93	26.13
