= Fereej Al Soudan =

Fereej Al Soudan فريج السودان
- District
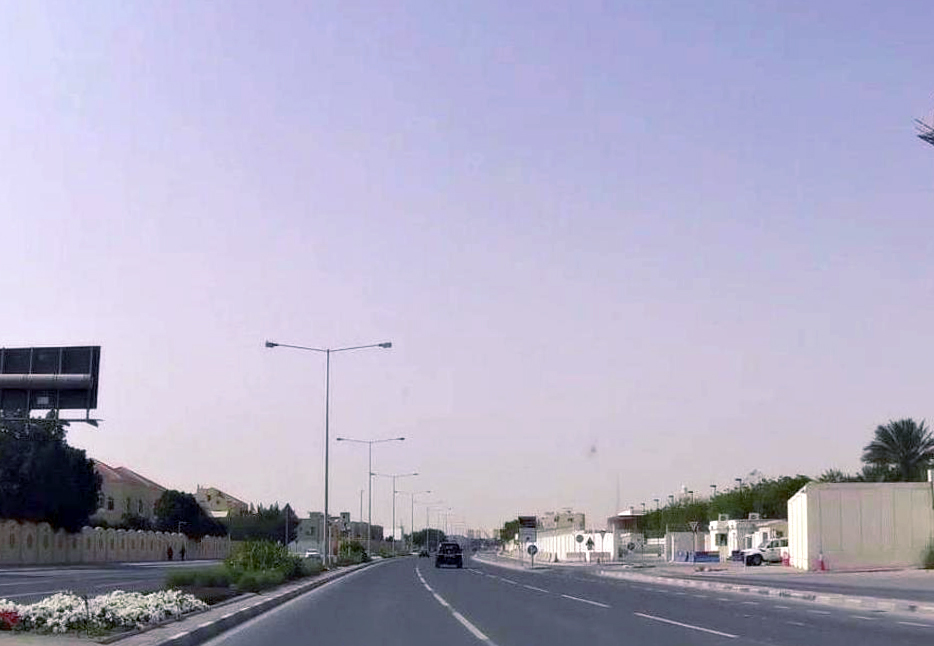
- Al Bustan Street in Fereej Al Soudan

- Location within Qatar
- Coordinates: 25°16′26″N 51°28′44″E
- Country: Qatar
- Municipality: Al Rayyan
- Zone: Zone 54, Zone 55
- District no.: 79

Area
  - Total: 3.5 km^{2} (1.4 sq mi)
- Elevation: 23 m (75 ft)

Fereej Al Soudan (Arabic: فريج السودان, romanized: Farīj as-Sūdān) is a district in Qatar, located in the municipality of Al Rayyan. It is mainly a residential area. In the 2015 census, it was listed as a district of Zone 55 which has a population of 283,675 and also includes Bu Sidra, Al Aziziya, Al Waab, New Fereej Al Ghanim, Muaither, Al Mearad, Fereej Al Manaseer, Fereej Al Murra and Al Sailiya. It is also listed as a district of Zone 54.

It borders Al Waab district to the south and Fereej Al Nasr and Al Sadd districts in Doha to the east. The district is connected to Al Waab through Al Waab Street, and both districts are being jointly developed as part of the Fereej Al Soudan District Centre plan. Furthermore, the District Centre will be complemented by infrastructure built in the neighboring Al Rayyan South Metropolitan Centre and Al Sadd Town Centre.

== Etymology ==
Fereej in Arabic translates to "neighborhood", while soudan is derived from the Al-Suwaidi tribe, which was among the first tribes to settle the area.

== Visitor attractions ==
Fereej Al Soudan Family Park is one of the smaller attractions in the neighborhood. It features a children's playground and a football pitch. Seating and parking is available.

== Transport ==
The underground Al Soudan station currently serves the Gold Line of the Doha Metro. As part of the metro's Phase 1, the station was inaugurated on 25 November, 2019 along with the other Gold Line stations. It is located on Al Waab Street, between Joaan station and Al Waab station.

Among the station's facilities are a prayer room and restrooms. There are currently no metrolink buses serving the station.

== Qatar National Master Plan ==
The Qatar National Master Plan (QNMP) is described as a "spatial representation of the Qatar National Vision 2030". As part of the QNMP's Urban Centre plan, which aims to implement development strategies in 28 central hubs that will serve their surrounding communities, Fereej Al Soudan has been designated a District Centre, which is the lowest designation.

Development of the District Centre will be oriented around the Al Sadd Stadium Metro Station. Mixed-use and retail buildings will primarily occupy the Centre. Much of the plan emphasizes a better connection between the district and Doha's transit system. As such, new bus routes, pedestrian infrastructure and parking lots will be created. More developments are also planned for Al Waab Street. A 10,401 m² mosque and a 3,788 m² community centre are planned for the Centre, as well as over 143,000 m² of sports facilities.

== Education ==
The American School of Doha, opened in 1988, is based in Fereej Al Soudan.

== Gallery ==
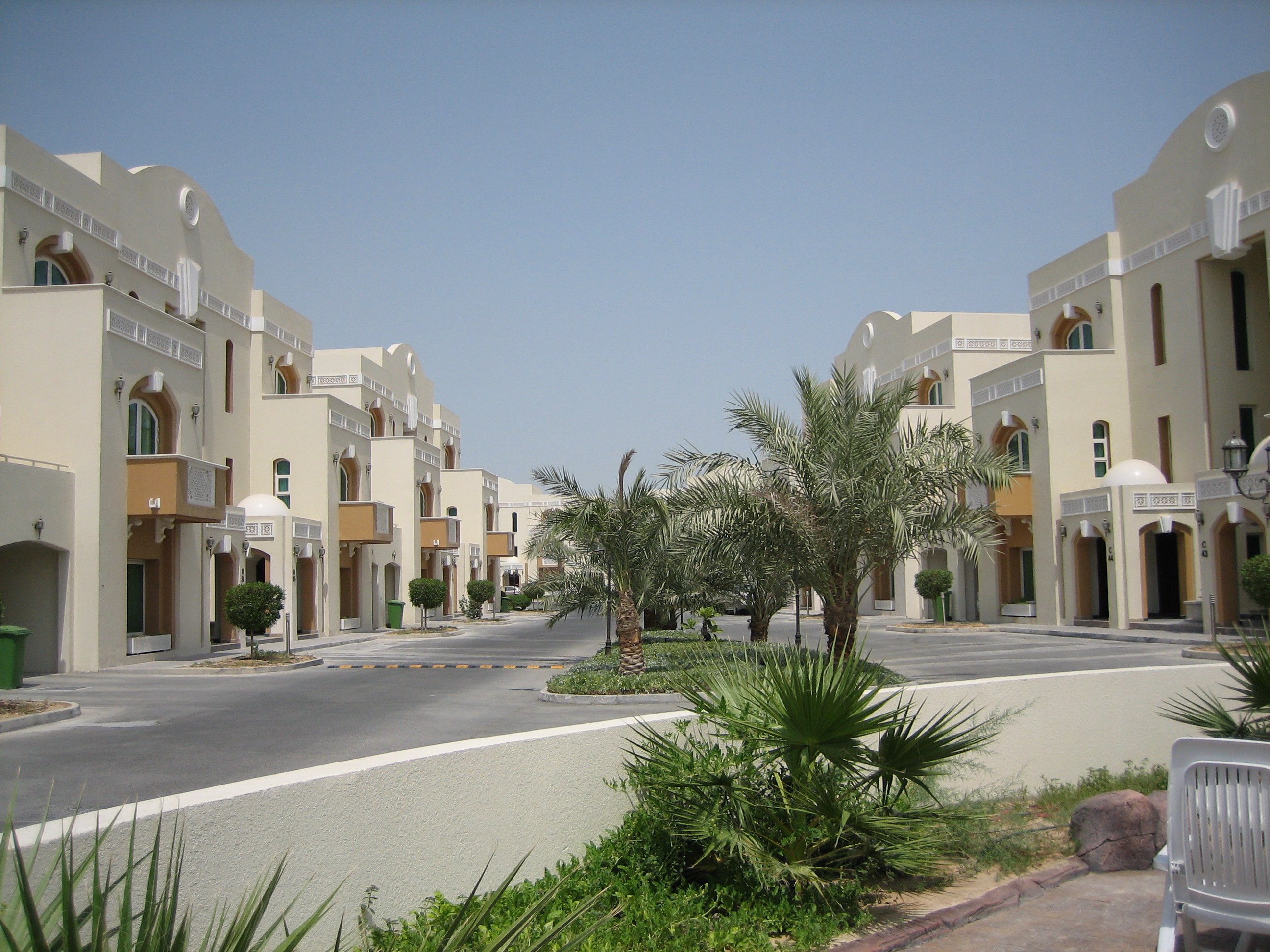
Samrya Gardens compound in Fereej Al Soudan
