= Al Mearad =

Al Mearad المعراض
- District
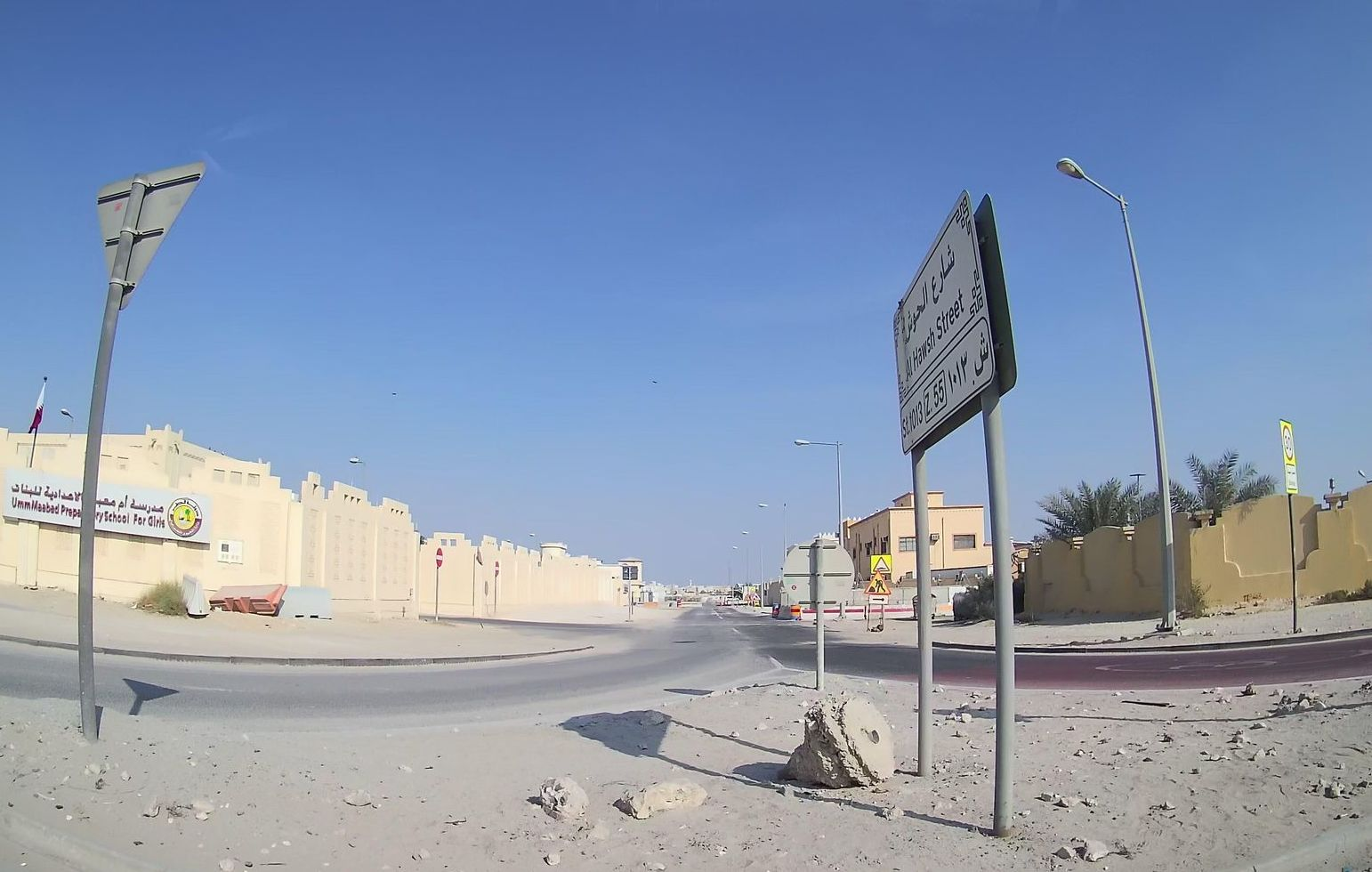
- Al Hawsh Street in Al Mearad

- Location within Qatar
- Coordinates: 25.2500°N 51.3732°E
- Country: Qatar
- Municipality: Al Rayyan
- Zone: Zone 55
- District no.: 90

Area
  - Total: 19.8 km^{2} (7.6 sq mi)
- Elevation: 40 m (130 ft)

Al Mearad (Arabic: المعراض, romanized: Al Mi‘rāḑ) is a district in Qatar, located in the municipality of Al Rayyan.

In the 2015 census, it was listed as a district of zone no. 55 which has a population of 283,675 and also includes New Fereej Al Ghanim, Al Aziziya, Al Waab, Fereej Al Soudan, Muaither, Bu Sidra, Fereej Al Manaseer, Fereej Al Murra and Al Sailiya.

Al Sailiya is located to the immediate north of the district while the Doha Industrial Area is south.

== Etymology ==
The term mearad in Arabic means "obstruction". This name came about due to the fact that the district lies in the pathway of a nearby rawda (depression).

== Infrastructure ==
Ashghal (the Public Works Authority) launched a QR 6.6 million project to construct a religious complex in Al Mearad in November 2013. Maha Al Khaleej Contracting Co. was selected as the contractor. As part of the project, a 1300 worshipper capacity mosque, an imam's house and a Quran learning center were constructed.

== Education ==
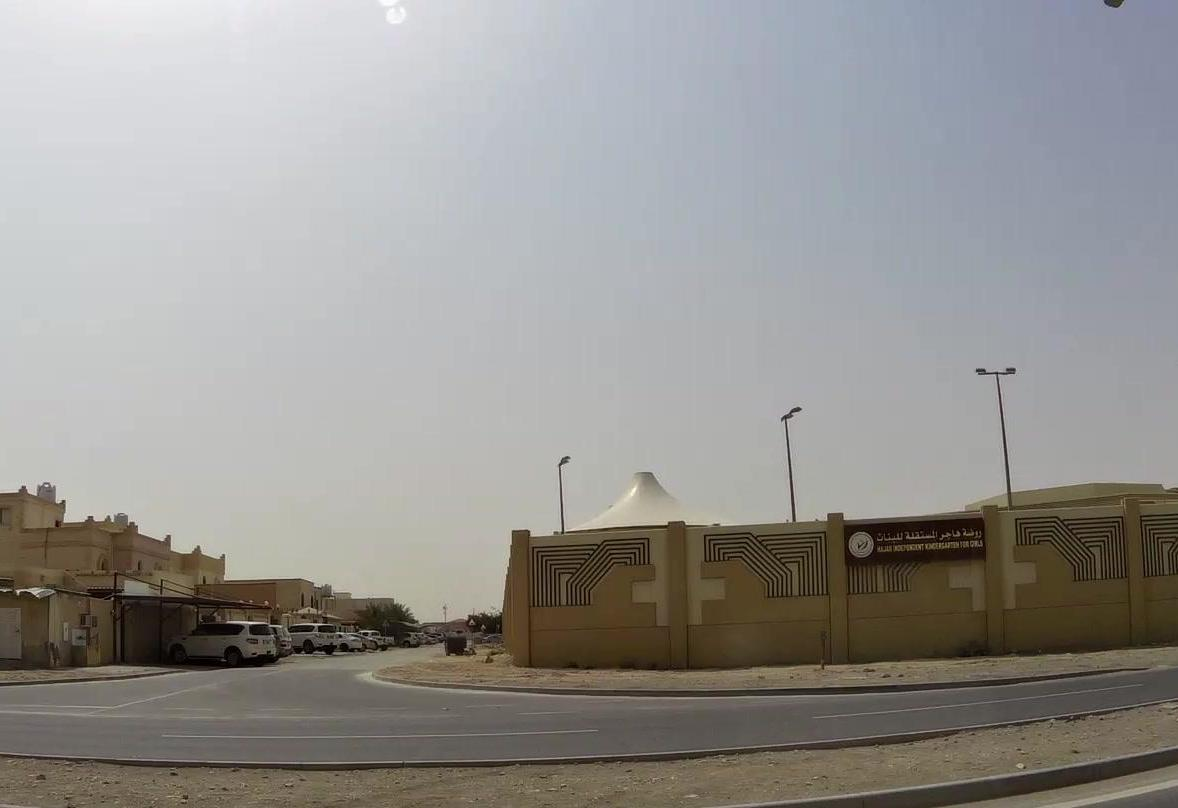
Al Hajar Independent Kindergarten for Girls in Al Mearad.

The following schools are located in Al Mearad:

Name of School	Curriculum	Grade	Genders	Ref
Hind Bint Abu Sufyan Secondary School for Girls	Independent	Secondary	Female-only	
Fatima Bint Al Walid Prep School for Girls	Independent	Secondary	Female-only	
Al Taawun Primary School for Girls	Independent	Primary	Female-only	
Al Huda Primary School for Girls	Independent	Primary	Female-only	
Rawda bint Jassim Secondary School for Girls	Independent	Secondary	Female-only	
Hajar Primary Independent School for Girls	Independent	Primary	Female-only	
Hajar Independent Kindergarten for Girls	Independent	Kindergarten	Female-only	
