= Fereej Al Murra =

Fereej Al Murra فريج المرة
- District
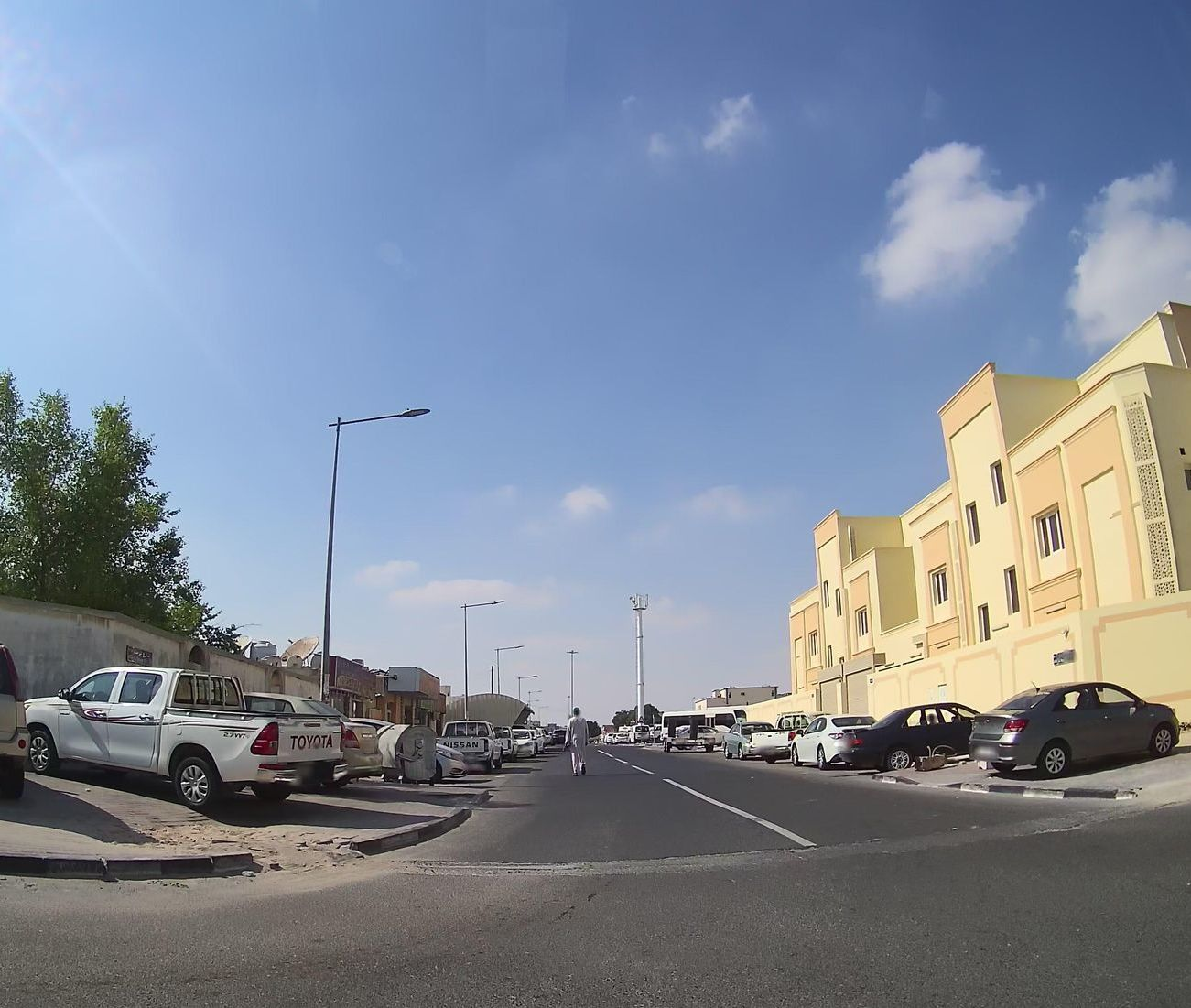
- Al Rajaa Street in Fereej Al Murra

- Location within Qatar
- Coordinates: 25.232157°N 51.436546°E
- Country: Qatar
- Municipality: Al Rayyan
- Zone: Zone 55
- District no.: 86

Area
  - Total: 1.1 km^{2} (0.42 sq mi)
- Elevation: 27 m (89 ft)

Fereej Al Murra (Arabic: فريج المرة) is a district in Qatar, located in the municipality of Al Rayyan. It is named after the Al Murrah tribe, who settled in the area in the 1960s.

In the 2015 census, it was listed as a district of zone no. 55 which has a population of 283,675 and also includes Bu Sidra, Al Aziziya, Al Waab, Fereej Al Soudan, Muaither, Al Mearad, New Fereej Al Ghanim, Fereej Al Manaseer and Al Sailiya.

It borders Bu Sidra to the west, the Doha Industrial Area to the south, Ain Khaled to the east and south-east, New Fereej Al Ghanim to the east, and Al Aziziya to the north.
