= Zones of Qatar =

Second tier of government

Zones مَنَاطِق (Arabic)
- Category: Unitary state
- Location: State of Qatar
- Number: 98
- Populations: 7 (Zone 98) – 364,710 (Zone 57)
- Areas: 0.2 km^{2} (0.077 sq mi) (Zone 5) – 902.4 km^{2} (348.4 sq mi) (Zone 95)
- Subdivisions: Districts Blocks

In the administrative divisions of Qatar, zones (Arabic: مَنَاطِق manāṭiq; singular مِنْطَقَة minṭaqa) are the second-highest level of government after municipalities. As of the 2015 census, there were 98 zones across the country. However, several of these zones are not currently in use. Over the years, numerous changes in zones have taken place. For instance, in the 2010 census, Zone 69 was transferred to Al Daayen Municipality, Zones 50 and 58 were added to Ad-Dawhah Municipality, and part of Zone 74 was merged with Zone 70 of Al Daayen Municipality.

Zones 1–50, 57, 58, and 60–68 are reserved for Ad-Dawhah Municipality; Zones 51–56, 81, 83, 96 and 97 are reserved for Al Rayyan Municipality; Zones 69 and 70 are reserved for Al Daayen Municipality; Zone 71 is reserved for Umm Salal Municipality; Zones 74–76 are reserved for Al Khor Municipality; Zones 77–79 are reserved for Al Shamal Municipality; Zones 90–95 and 98 are reserved for Al Wakrah Municipality; and Zones 72, 73, 80, 82, and 84–86 are reserved for Al-Shahaniya Municipality.

Zones are composed of planning districts, of which there are 773 as of 2015. The lowest statistical unit used for planning is a census block, of which the total in 2010 was 4,344, increasing from 2,464 in 2004.

== Zones by municipality ==
=== Doha Municipality ===
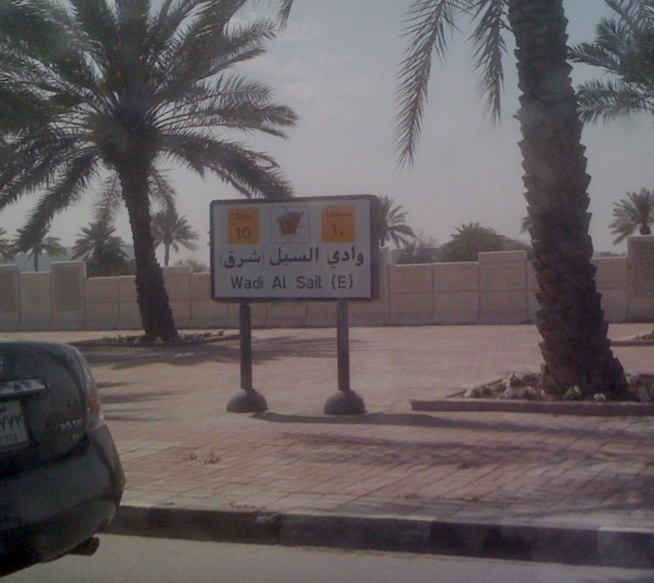
Typical signage for depicting zones

There are 56 zones designated in Doha Municipality as of 2015.

Zone not recorded in latest census (2015)

Zone no.	Districts	Area (km^{2})	Population (2015)
1	Al Jasrah	0.4	240 (2010)
2	Al Bidda	N/A	35 (2010)
3	Fereej Mohamed Bin Jasim; Mushayrib	N/A	4,886 (2010)
4	Mushayrib	0.3	9,791
5	Al Najada; Barahat Al Jufairi; Fereej Al Asmakh	0.2	2,086
6	Old Al Ghanim	0.3	1,124
7	Al Souq	0.3	297
10	Wadi Al Sail	N/A	8 (2010)
11	Rumeilah	N/A	63 (2010)
12	Al Bidda	N/A	1,067 (2010)
13	Mushayrib	0.7	18,278
14	Fereej Abdel Aziz	0.5	15,706
15	Ad Dawhah al Jadidah	0.5	15,920
16	Old Al Ghanim	0.4	16,334
17	Al Rufaa; Old Al Hitmi	0.4	6,026
18	As Salatah; Al Mirqab	0.6	692
19	Doha Port	N/A	6 (2010)
20	Wadi Al Sail	1.3	240
21	Rumeilah	0.8	1,590
22	Fereej Bin Mahmoud	0.6	11,241
23	Fereej Bin Mahmoud	1.8	17,086
24	Rawdat Al Khail	1.7	18,200
25	Fereej Bin Durham; Al Mansoura	1.5	37,082
26	Najma	1.1	28,228
27	Umm Ghuwailina	1.4	33,262
28	Al Khulaifat; Ras Abu Aboud	0.9	1,731
30	Duhail	6.8	7,705
31	Umm Lekhba	3.1	11,897
32	Madinat Khalifa North; Dahl Al Hamam	2.4	12,364
33	Al Markhiya	2.7	6,242
34	Madinat Khalifa South	2.6	38,247
35	Fereej Kulaib	1.1	6,507
36	Al Messila	2.1	6,803
37	Fereej Bin Omran; New Al Hitmi; Hamad Medical City	2.5	26,121
38	Al Sadd	3.5	17,820
39	Al Sadd; New Al Mirqab; Fereej Al Nasr	2.7	23,853
40	New Salatah	3.5	16,086
41	Nuaija	1.2	4,743
42	Al Hilal	1.8	11,671
43	Nuaija	4.8	14,871
44	Nuaija	3.2	13,765
45	Old Airport	4.7	48,525
46	Al Thumama	3.7	8,552
47	Al Thumama	3.3	12,815
48	Doha International Airport	11.6	1,853
49	Ras Abu Fontas	12.9	442
50	Al Thumama	7.6	1,137
57	Industrial Area	32.1	364,710
58	Wholesale Market	0.8	4,692
61	Al Dafna; Al Qassar	4.0	4,022
63	Onaiza	2.0	7,562
64	Lejbailat	1.4	4,151
65	Onaiza	2.1	7,875
66	Onaiza; Leqtaifiya; Al Qassar	26.1	22,024
67	Hazm Al Markhiya	4.2	8,967
68	Jelaiah; Al Tarfa; Jeryan Nejaima	9.7	5,521
Municipality		234	956,457

=== Al Rayyan Municipality ===
There are 10 zones designated in Al Rayyan Municipality as of 2015.

Zone no.	Districts	Area (km^{2})	Population (2015)
51	Al Gharrafa; Gharrafat Al Rayyan; Izghawa; Bani Hajer; Al Seej; Rawdat Egdaim; Al Themaid	80.9	56,027
52	Al Luqta; Lebday; Old Al Rayyan; Al Shagub; Fereej Al Zaeem	13.4	18,433
53	New Al Rayyan; Al Wajbah; Muaither	110.9	77,875
54	Fereej Al Amir; Luaib; Muraikh; Baaya; Mehairja; Fereej Al Soudan	18.1	24,593
55	Fereej Al Soudan; Al Waab; Al Aziziya; New Fereej Al Ghanim; Fereej Al Murra; Fereej Al Manaseer; Bu Sidra; Muaither; Al Sailiya; Al Mearad	82.4	283,675
56	Fereej Al Asiri; New Fereej Al Khulaifat; Bu Samra; Al Mamoura; Abu Hamour; Mesaimeer; Ain Khaled; Umm Al Seneem	61.1	128,928
81	Mebaireek	160.5	12,483
83	Al Karaana	554.3	2,614
96	Abu Samra	801.7	984
97	Sawda Natheel	566.7	100
Total		2450	605,712

=== Al Daayen Municipality ===
There are 2 zones designated in Al Daayen Municipality as of 2015.

Zone no.	Districts	Area (km^{2})	Population (2015)
69	Jabal Thuaileb; Al Kharayej; Lusail; Al Egla; Wadi Al Banat	51.1	1,338
70	Leabaib; Al Ebb; Jeryan Jenaihat; Al Kheesa; Rawdat Al Hamama; Wadi Al Wasaah; Al Sakhama; Al Masrouhiya; Wadi Lusail; Lusail; Umm Qarn; Al Daayen	239.1	53,001
Total		290.2	54,339

=== Umm Salal Municipality ===
There is 1 zone designated in Umm Salal Municipality as of 2015.

Zone no.	Districts	Area (km^{2})	Population (2015)
71	Bu Fasseela; Izghawa; Al Kharaitiyat; Umm Salal Ali; Umm Salal Mohammed; Saina Al-Humaidi; Umm Al Amad; Umm Ebairiya	318.4	90,835
Total		318.4	90,835

=== Al Khor Municipality ===
There are 3 zones designated in Al Khor Municipality as of 2015.

Zone no.	Districts	Area (km^{2})	Population (2015)
74	Simaisma; Al Jeryan; Al Khor City	373.9	96,169
75	Al Thakhira; Ras Laffan; Umm Birka	610.8	100,118
76	Al Ghuwariyah	628.6	5,744
Total		1613.3	202,031

=== Al Shamal Municipality ===
There are 3 zones designated in Al Shamal Municipality as of 2015.

Zone no.	Districts	Area (km^{2})	Population (2015)
77	Ain Sinan; Madinat Al Kaaban; Fuwayrit	266.0	1,727
78	Abu Dhalouf; Zubarah	427.2	1,660
79	Madinat ash Shamal; Ar Ru'ays	166.6	5,407
Total		859.8	8,794

=== Al Shahaniya Municipality ===
There are 7 zones designated in Al-Shahaniya Municipality as of 2015.

Zone no.	Districts	Area (km^{2})	Population (2015)
72	Al Utouriya	662.2	1,232
73	Al Jemailiya	623.3	1,685
80	Al-Shahaniya City	287.1	138,509
82	Rawdat Rashed	454.1	26,258
84	Umm Bab	494.1	5,305
85	Al Nasraniya	423.2	1,308
86	Dukhan	365	13,274
Total		3309	187,571

=== Al Wakrah Municipality ===
There are 7 zones designated in Al Wakrah Municipality as of 2015.

Zone no.	Districts	Area (km)	Population (2015)
90	Al Wakrah	75.8	87,970
91	Al Thumama; Al Wukair; Al Mashaf	203.4	165,214
92	Mesaieed	133.2	37,548
93	Mesaieed Industrial Area	60.7	106
94	Shagra	497.2	4,714
95	Al Kharrara	902.4	3,478
98	Khor Al Adaid	705	7
Total		2577.7	299,037
