= Zone 58, Qatar =

Zone 58
- Zone
- Interactive map of Zone 58
- Coordinates: 25.240866°N 51.480349°E
- Country: Qatar
- Municipality: Doha
- Blocks: 4

Area
  - Total: 0.8 km^{2} (0.31 sq mi)

Population
  - Total: 4,692 (2,015)
- Time zone: UTC+03 (Arabia Standard Time)
- ISO 3166 code: QA-DA

Zone 58 is a zone of the municipality of Doha in the state of Qatar.

== Demographics ==
Year	Population
1986	459
1997	1,281
2004	706
2010	494
2015	4,692

== Land use ==
The Ministry of Municipality and Environment's breakdown of land use in the zone is as follows.

Area (km^{2})	Developed land (km^{2})	Undeveloped land (km^{2})	Residential (km^{2})	Commercial/ Industrial (km^{2})	Education/ Health (km^{2})	Farming/ Green areas (km^{2})	Other uses (km^{2})
0.82	0.66	0.15	0.00	0.43	0.00	0.00	0.23
