= Zone 53, Qatar =

Zone 53
- Zone
- Interactive map of Zone 53
- Coordinates: 25.283398°N 51.355470°E
- Country: Qatar
- Municipality: Al Rayyan
- Blocks: 210

Area
  - Total: 110.9 km^{2} (42.8 sq mi)

Population
  - Total: 77,875 (2,015)
- Time zone: UTC+03 (Arabia Standard Time)
- ISO 3166 code: QA-RA

Zone 53 is a zone of the municipality of Al Rayyan in Qatar. The main districts recorded in the 2015 population census were New Al Rayyan, Al Wajbah, and Muaither.

== Demographics ==
Year	Population
1986	15,350
1997	30,289
2004	41,261
2010	76,291
2015	77,875

== Land use ==
The Ministry of Municipality and Environment's breakdown of land use in the zone is as follows.

Area (km^{2})	Developed land (km^{2})	Undeveloped land (km^{2})	Residential (km^{2})	Commercial/ Industrial (km^{2})	Education/ Health (km^{2})	Farming/ Green areas (km^{2})	Other uses (km^{2})
110.94	81.85	29.09	5.88	0.30	0.42	0.43	74.82
