= Zone 50, Qatar =

Zone 50
- Zone
- Interactive map of Zone 50
- Coordinates: 25.219121°N 51.558200°E
- Country: Qatar
- Municipality: Doha
- Blocks: 18

Area
  - Total: 7.6 km^{2} (2.9 sq mi)

Population
  - Total: 1,137 (2,015)
- Time zone: UTC+03 (Arabia Standard Time)
- ISO 3166 code: QA-DA

Zone 50 is a zone of the municipality of Doha in Qatar.

== Demographics ==
Year	Population
1986	1,571
1997	771
2004	317
2010	1,835
2015	1,137

== Land use ==
The Ministry of Municipality and Environment's breakdown of land use in the zone is as follows.

Area (km^{2})	Developed land (km^{2})	Undeveloped land (km^{2})	Residential (km^{2})	Commercial/ Industrial (km^{2})	Education/ Health (km^{2})	Farming/ Green areas (km^{2})	Other uses (km^{2})
7.64	3.71	3.92	0.03	0.12	0.00	0.02	3.54
