= Fereej Al Asiri =

Fereej Al Asiri فريج العسيري
- District
- Fereej Al Asiri
- Coordinates: 25°15′31″N 51°30′11″E
- Country: Qatar
- City: Al Rayyan
- Zone no.: 56

Fereej Al Asiri (Arabic: فريج العسيري, romanized: Farīj al-'Asīrī; also referred to simply as Al Asiri) is a district of the municipality of Al Rayyan in Qatar. It is situated on the border with Doha Municipality and is thus considered a part of the Doha Metropolitan Area. The district of Al Mamoura borders it to the south, New Salata borders it to the east and Fereej Al Nasr borders it to the north.

A popular landmark is the Al Asiri Interchange, which was formerly known as the Midmac Roundabout because it hosted the headquarters of Qatari contracting company Midmac from 1979 to May 2008. The Al Faleh Training Centre, affiliated to Doha Academy, is also found in the district.

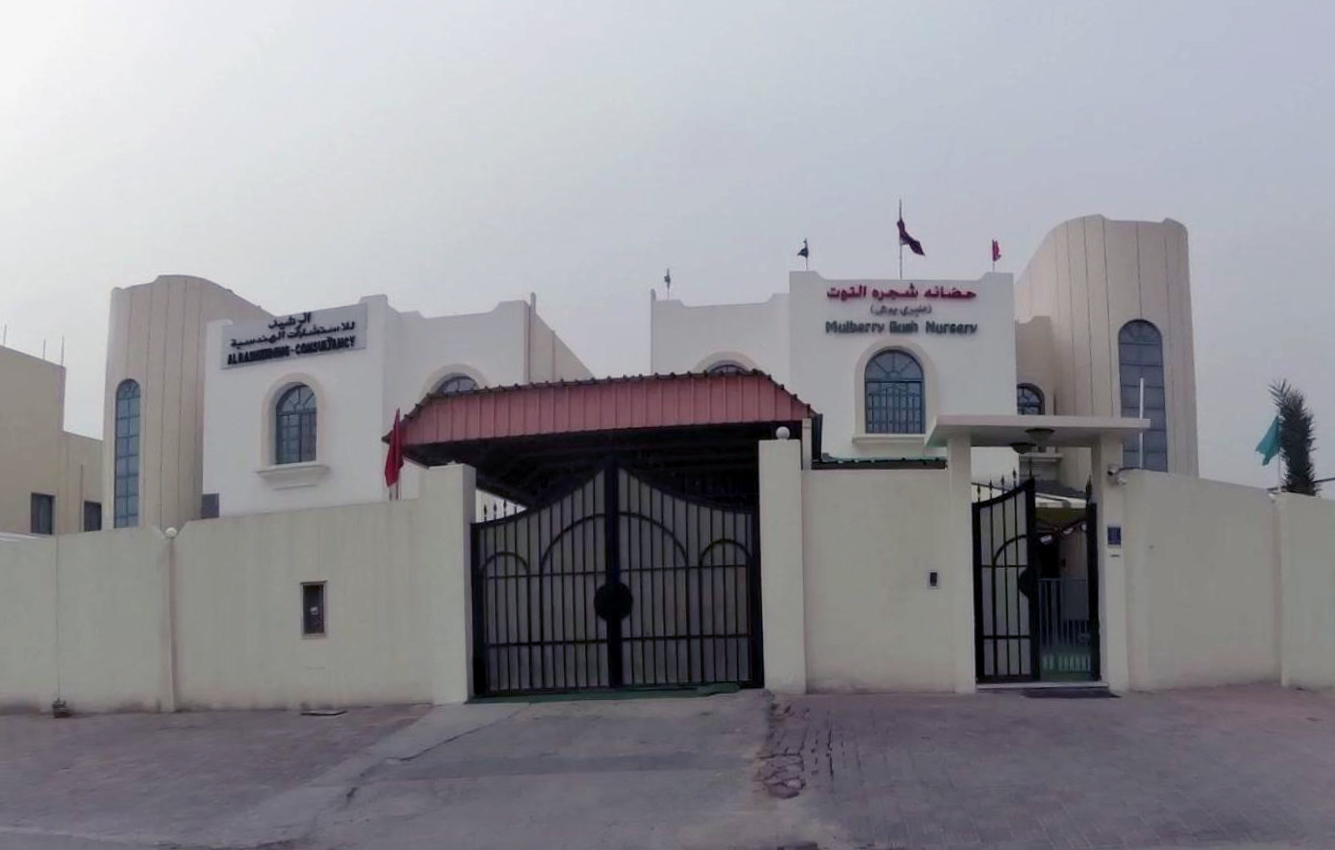
Businesses in Fereej Al Asiri off Usama bin Munqith Street
