= Hazm Al Markhiya =

Hazm Al Markhiya حزم المرخية
- District
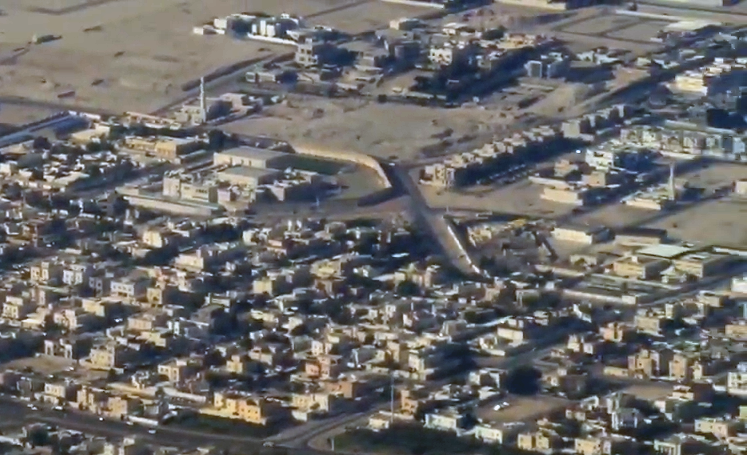
- Aerial view of the northeastern boundary of Hazm Al Markhiya

- Location within Doha Location within Qatar
- Coordinates: 25°20′10″N 51°29′39″E
- Country: Qatar
- Municipality: Doha
- Zone: Zone 67
- District no.: 107

Area
  - Total: 4.2 km^{2} (1.6 sq mi)

Population (2015)
  - Total: 8,967
  - Density: 2,100/km^{2} (5,500/sq mi)

Hazm Al Markhiya (Arabic: حزم المرخية, romanized: Ḥazm al-Markhiyah) is a neighborhood of Doha, Qatar.

== Etymology ==
In Arabic, hazm refers to a natural hill. The other constituent is a reference to the neighboring district of Al Markhiya, which received its name from a tree that grows abundantly in the region known locally as markh (Leptadenia pyrotechnica).

== Landmarks ==
- Bin Muftah Medical Center on Al Markhiya Street.
- Feto Maternal Center on Rawdat Al Tair Street.
- West Bay Health Centre on Al Asdaf Street.
- Water Networks Affairs Laboratory on Saihan Street.
- Green Qatar Centre and Qatar Green Centre Park on Jery Al Hesan Street.
- Al Markhiya Complex on Saihan Street.
- Embassy of the Republic of Venezuela in Doha on Samura Bin Jundub Street.
- Embassy of the Central African Republic in Doha on Rawdat Nazwa Street.

== Transport ==
Major roads that run through the district are University Street, Al Khafji Street and Al Markhiya Street.

== Demographics ==
As of the 2010 census, the district comprised 900 housing units and 71 establishments. There were 8,586 people living in the district, of which 48% were male and 52% were female. Out of the 8,586 inhabitants, 67% were 20 years of age or older and 33% were under the age of 20. The literacy rate stood at 95.8%.

Employed persons made up 52% of the total population. Females accounted for 49% of the working population, while males accounted for 51% of the working population.

== Education ==
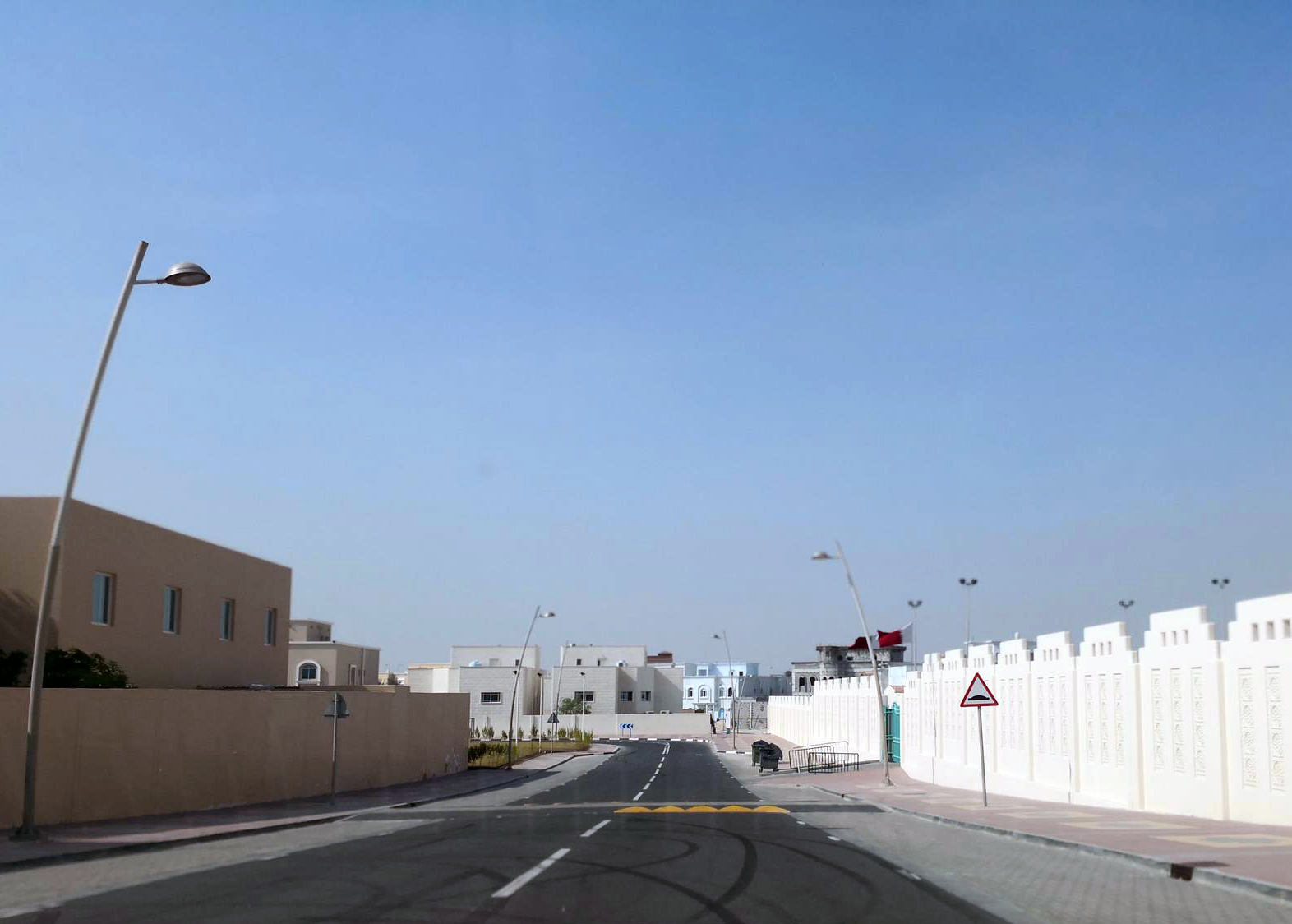
Al Bayan Educational Complex (right) on Negyan Al Afja Street in Hazm Al Markhiya.

The following schools are located in Hazm Al Markhiya:

Name of School	Curriculum	Grade	Genders	Official Website	Ref
Kanga's Pouch Nursery	British	Kindergarten	Both	Official website	
Edison International Academy	British	Kindergarten – Primary	Both	Official website	
Tiny Town British Nursery	British	Kindergarten	Both	N/A	
The Community College of Qatar for Boys	Qatari	College	Male-only	Official website	
Al Bayan First Independent Elementary School for Girls	Qatari	Primary	Female-only	N/A	
