= Doha Zoo =

Zoo in Doha, Qatar

Doha Zoological Garden حديقة حيوان الدوحة
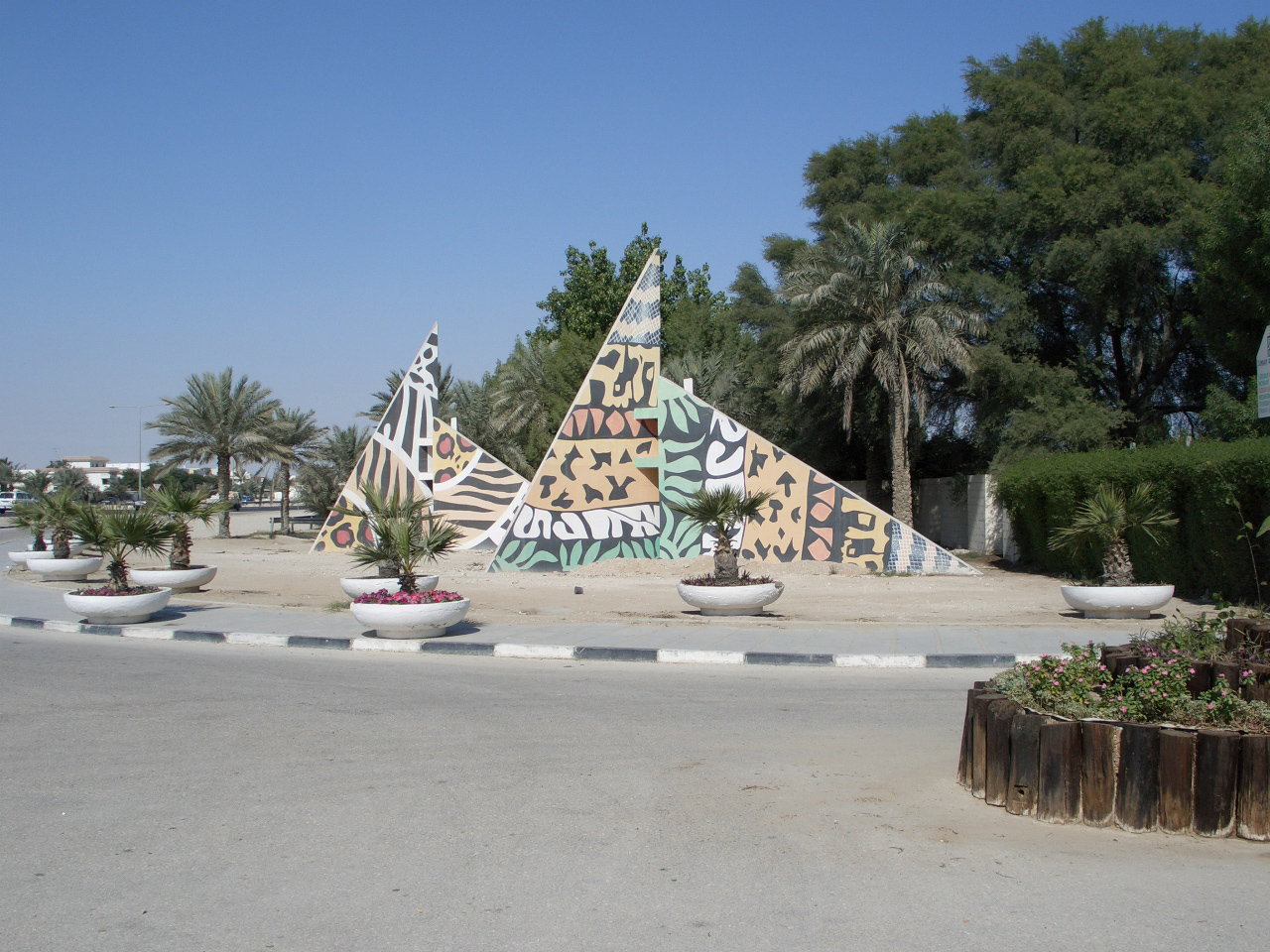
- Doha Zoo in 2006
- Date opened: February 1984
- Date closed: 2013
- Land area: 75 hectares (185.3 acres)
- Annual visitors: None (closed)
- Major exhibits: Zoo, aviary, cave

The Doha Zoo was a Zoological garden established in Qatar in February 1984. It was closed in 2012 for renovations, with a scheduled reopening in 2017.

In 2023, Doha Zoo and Al Khor Park Zoo recorded 265 new animal births among various species.
