= Al Mashaf =

Al Meshaf المشاف
- District
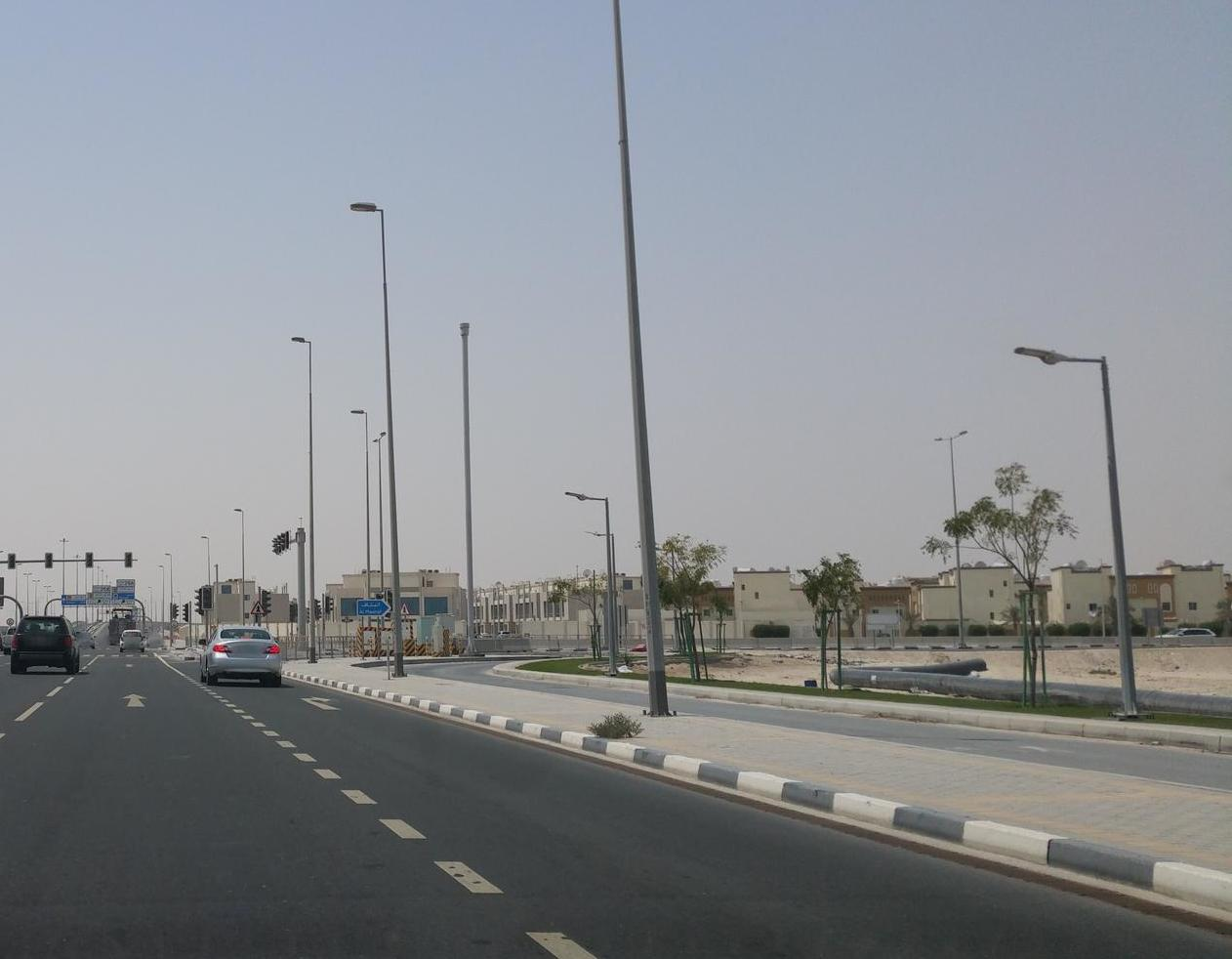
- Turn off to Al Meshaf on Al Wukair Road.

- Location within Qatar
- Coordinates: 25.17528°N 51.56902°E
- Country: Qatar
- Municipality: Al Wakrah
- Zone: Zone 91
- District no.: 640

Area
  - Total: 7.1 km^{2} (2.7 sq mi)
- Elevation: 6 m (20 ft)

Al Meshaf (Arabic: المشاف) is a Qatari district located in the municipality of Al Wakrah.

In the 2015 census, it was listed as a district of Zone 91, which has a population of 165,214 and also includes Al Wukair and Al Thumama.

It borders Al Wakrah to the east and Al Wukair to the southwest.

== Etymology ==
The district's name has its roots in the Arabic word shouf, which is translated as "to elevate". It acquired this name due to its relatively high elevation when compared to the coastal area surrounding it.

== Education ==
The following schools are located in Al Mashaf:

Name of School	Curriculum	Grade	Genders	Official Website	Ref
GEMS Wellington School	British	Kindergarten – Secondary	Both	Official website	
GEMS American Academy	American	Kindergarten – Secondary	Both	Official website	
Jaber Bin Hayan School for Boys	Independent	Primary	Boys-only	N/A	
