= Sawda Natheel =

Sawda Natheel سودا نثيل
- Border crossing
- Location within Qatar
- Coordinates: 24°34′06″N 51°04′06″E
- Country: Qatar
- Zone no.: 97
- Municipality: Al Rayyan
- District no.: 746

Area
  - Total: 566.7 km^{2} (218.8 sq mi)
- Elevation: 14 m (46 ft)

Population (2015)
  - Total: 100
  - Density: 0.18/km^{2} (0.46/sq mi)

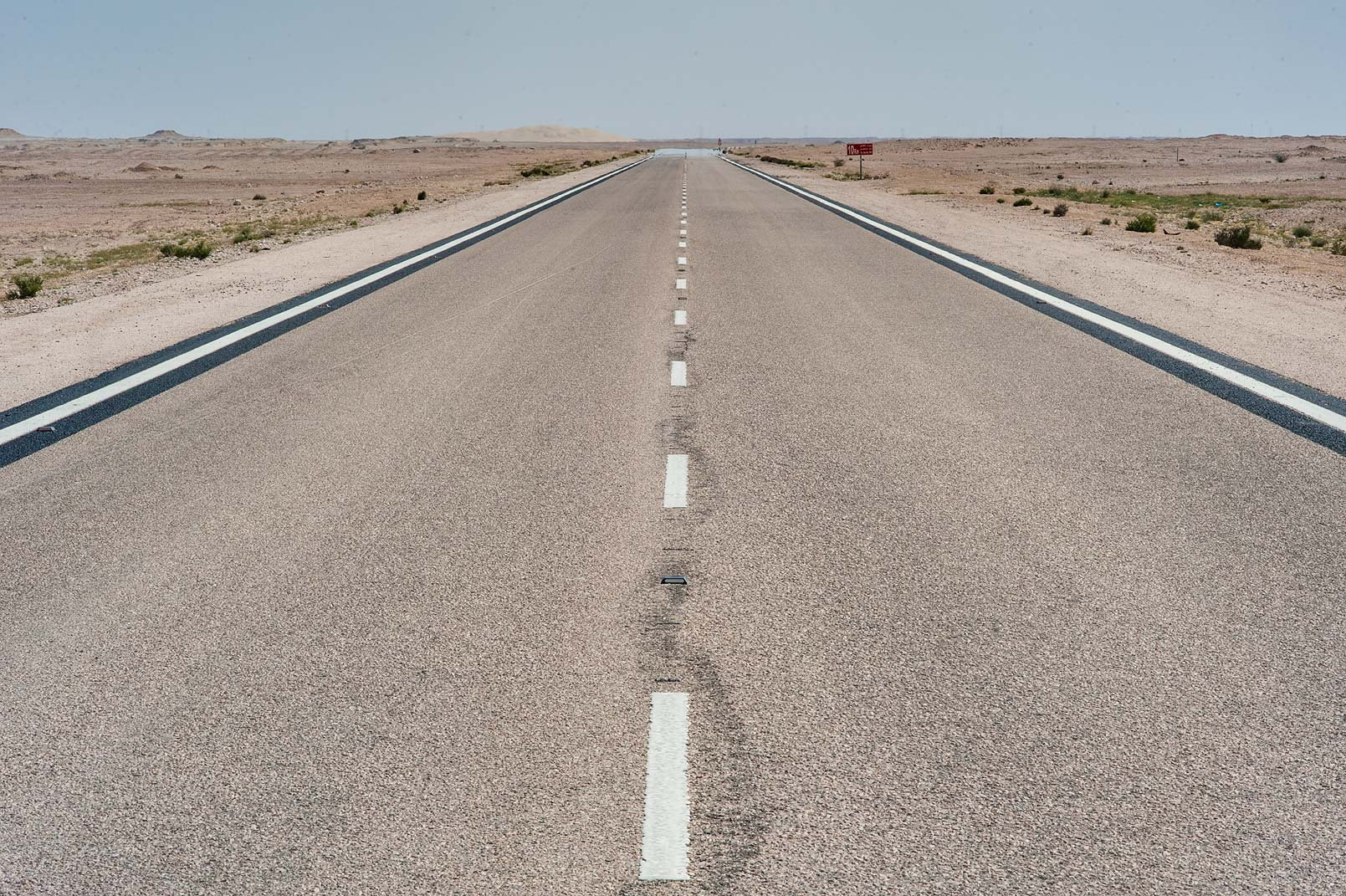
Sawda Natheel Road.

Sawda Natheel (Arabic: سودا نثيل, romanized: Sawdā’ Nathīl) is an area in southern Qatar, located in the municipality of Al Rayyan. It used to be part of the Jariyan Al Batnah municipality before the municipality was incorporated into Al Rayyan.

It is a highly undeveloped area, consisting essentially of open desert. Of the 566.7 square km area of its zone, only 3 square km of land is under use. Farmland occupies 2 square km and cultural establishments account for the remaining 1 square km. The district itself only accounts for 49.6 km^{2} of the zone. Noteworthy features in the area are a defunct border post separating the southern part of the municipality from Saudi Arabia, a well which the area was named after, and several farms.

== Etymology ==
The area derived its name from the local well, which in turn had been named after dark precipitates found in its water. Sawda translates to "black", while natheel is an Arabic term used to denote soil deposits found in water obtained from a well. It is also known as Markaz Sawda Natheel, with markaz translating to "center of".

== Geography ==
Qatar's capital, Doha, is located at a distance of 115 kilometres (71 mi) to the north-east. The most distant city is Madinat ash Shamal, which is 222 kilometres (138 mi) away.

== Border crossing ==
In the past, Sawda Natheel accommodated a border crossing into the UAE. This crossing was a vital economic boon for Qatar as it provided a direct pathway for bilateral trade between the two countries. Nonetheless, in the early 21st century, after renegotiation between the Saudis and Emiratis over their respective boundaries, the UAE ceded its side of the border to Saudi Arabia. This border crossing was not repurposed for Saudi Arabia-bound traffic due to a similar and more developed border crossing already existing in the nearby district of Abu Samra.

== Healthcare ==
In the mid-1980s, the government opened a healthcare clinic here.

== Demographics ==
As of the 2010 census, the area comprised 8 housing units and 9 establishments. There were 15 people living in the area, of which 100% were male and 0% were female. Out of the 15 inhabitants, 14 were 20 years of age or older and 1 was under the age of 20. The literacy rate stood at 73.4%.

Employed persons made up 100% of the total population. Females accounted for 0% of the working population, while males accounted for 100% of the working population.

Year	Population
1986	270
1997	167
2004	58
2010	15
2015	100
