= 2011 Qatari municipal elections =

Municipal elections were held in Qatar on 10 May 2011 for the fourth time. Turnout was 43%, with 13,000 of the 32,000 registered voters participating.
