= Muaither =

Muaither معيذر
- District
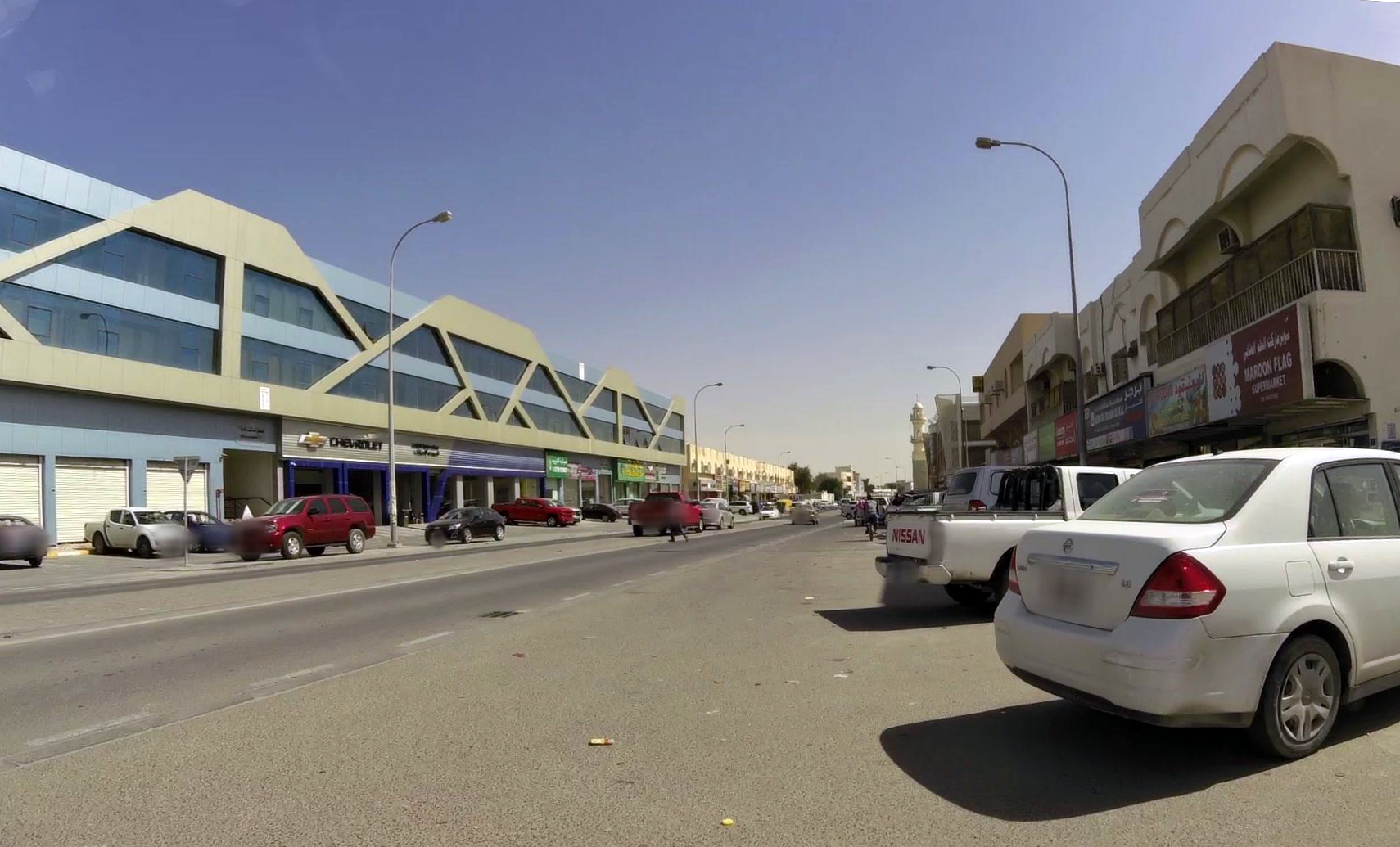
- Muaither Street hosts several businesses and runs through the center of Muaither.

- Location within Qatar
- Coordinates: 25°15′58″N 51°25′15″E
- Country: Qatar
- Municipality: Al Rayyan
- Zone: Zone 53, Zone 55
- District no.: 88

Area
  - Total: 14.4 km^{2} (5.6 sq mi)
- Elevation: 31 m (102 ft)

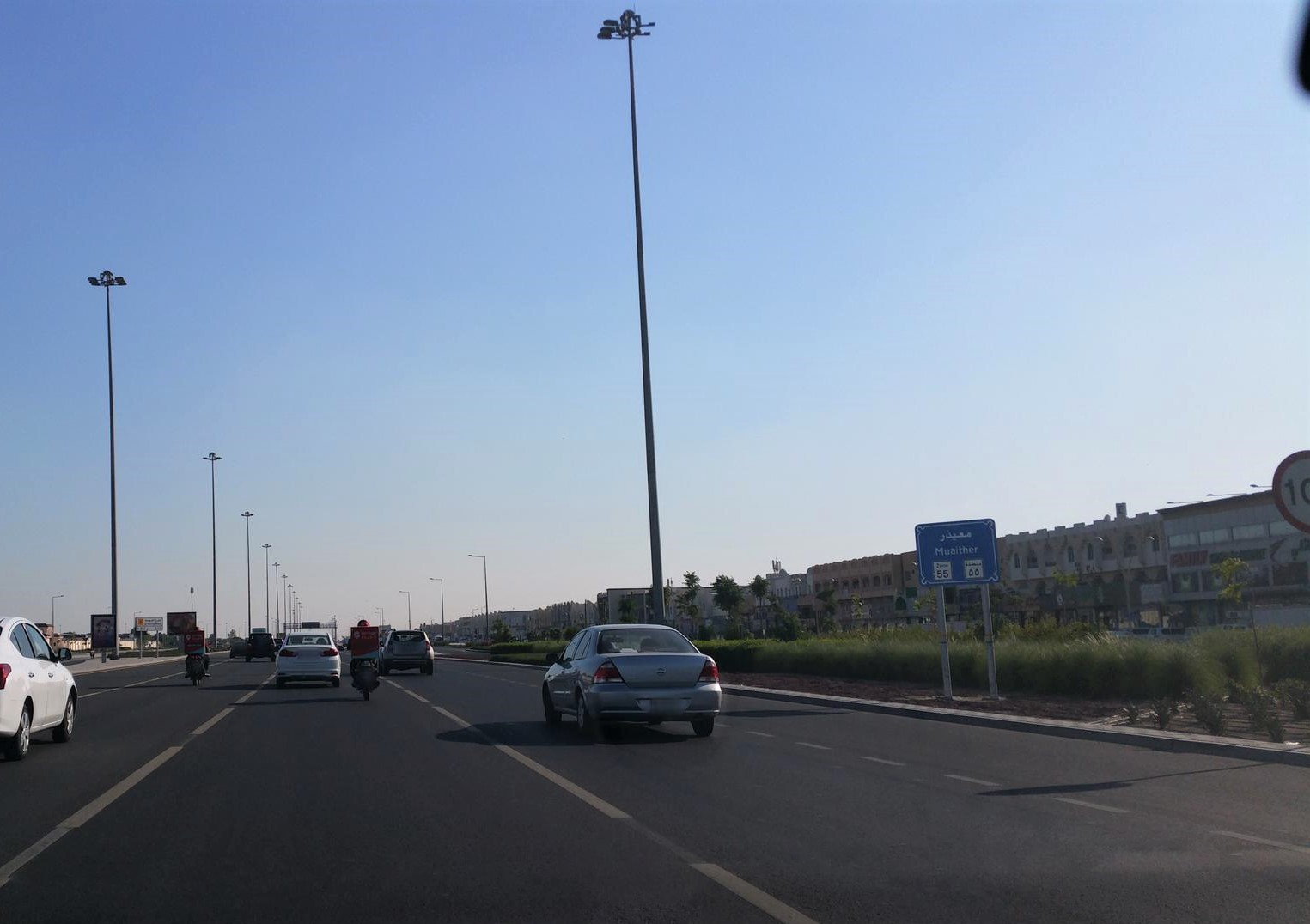
Sign for Muaither 55 on Al Furousiya Street.

Muaither (Arabic: معيذر, romanized: Mu'aīdhir) is a district of Al Rayyan City in Qatar, located in the municipality of Al Rayyan.

== Etymology ==
Referencing the area's geography, Muaither is derived from the Arabic mathar, meaning "place where animals are kept". Muaither is situated in a rawda (depression), meaning that water runoff accumulates in it, leading to increased plant activity. Various perennials such as the samr tree and fennel grow here. As such, the area serves as a good grazing area for Bedouins rearing their livestock.

== Administration ==
When free elections of the Central Municipal Council first took place in Qatar during 1999, Muaither was designated the seat of constituency no. 15. It would remain seat of constituency no. 15 in the next three consecutive elections until the fifth municipal elections in 2015, when it was decided that it would become the seat of constituency no. 12. It is the only electoral district in its constituency.

In the inaugural municipal elections in 1999, Hamad Abdullah Al-Marri won the elections, receiving 33.1%, or 188 votes. Trailing behind him with 22%, or 125 votes was Dafi Rashid Al-Marri. Voter turnout was 78.7%. Hamad Abdullah Al-Marri was defeated by Dafi Rashid Al-Marri in the 2002 elections, who then lost his seat to Mohammed Ali Al-Neda in 2007. In both the 2011 and 2015 elections, Al-Neda was successful in retaining his seat.

== Landmarks ==
- Muaither Gardens on Rawdat Jarrah Street.
- Q-Post office on Muaither S Street.
- Muaither Family Park on Al Bahtari Street.
- Muaither Park on Al Aqda Street.

== Health ==
Al-Hekma Medical Complex, a health care facility, is located in Muaither.

== Transport ==
Currently, the underground Muaither Metro Station of Doha Metro's Green Line is under construction, having been launched during Phase 2B.

== Sports ==
Muaither is currently represented by Muaither SC, a multi-sports club whose football team competes in the second division of Qatari football.

== Education ==
The following schools are located in Muaither:

Name of school	Curriculum	Grade	Genders	Official website	Ref
Al Andalus Elementary Private Schools for Boys	Independent	Primary	Male-only	Official website	
Al Emam Ashafei Prep Independent Boys	Independent	Primary – Secondary	Male-only	N/A	
Bright Future Pakistani Private School	International	Kindergarten – Secondary	Both	Official website	
Creator Kids Kindergarten	Independent	Kindergarten	Both	N/A	
Edison International Academy - Muaither branch	International	Kindergarten – Secondary	Both	N/A	
Hayat Universal School	International	Kindergarten – Secondary	Both	Official website	
Kids Academy Kindergarten	International	Kindergarten	Both	N/A	
Modern Muaither Kindergarten	Independent	Kindergarten	Both	N/A	
Royal International School	International	Kindergarten – Secondary	Both	N/A	
The Scholars' International School	International	Kindergarten – Secondary	Both	Official website	
