= Al Waab =

Al Waab الوعب
- District
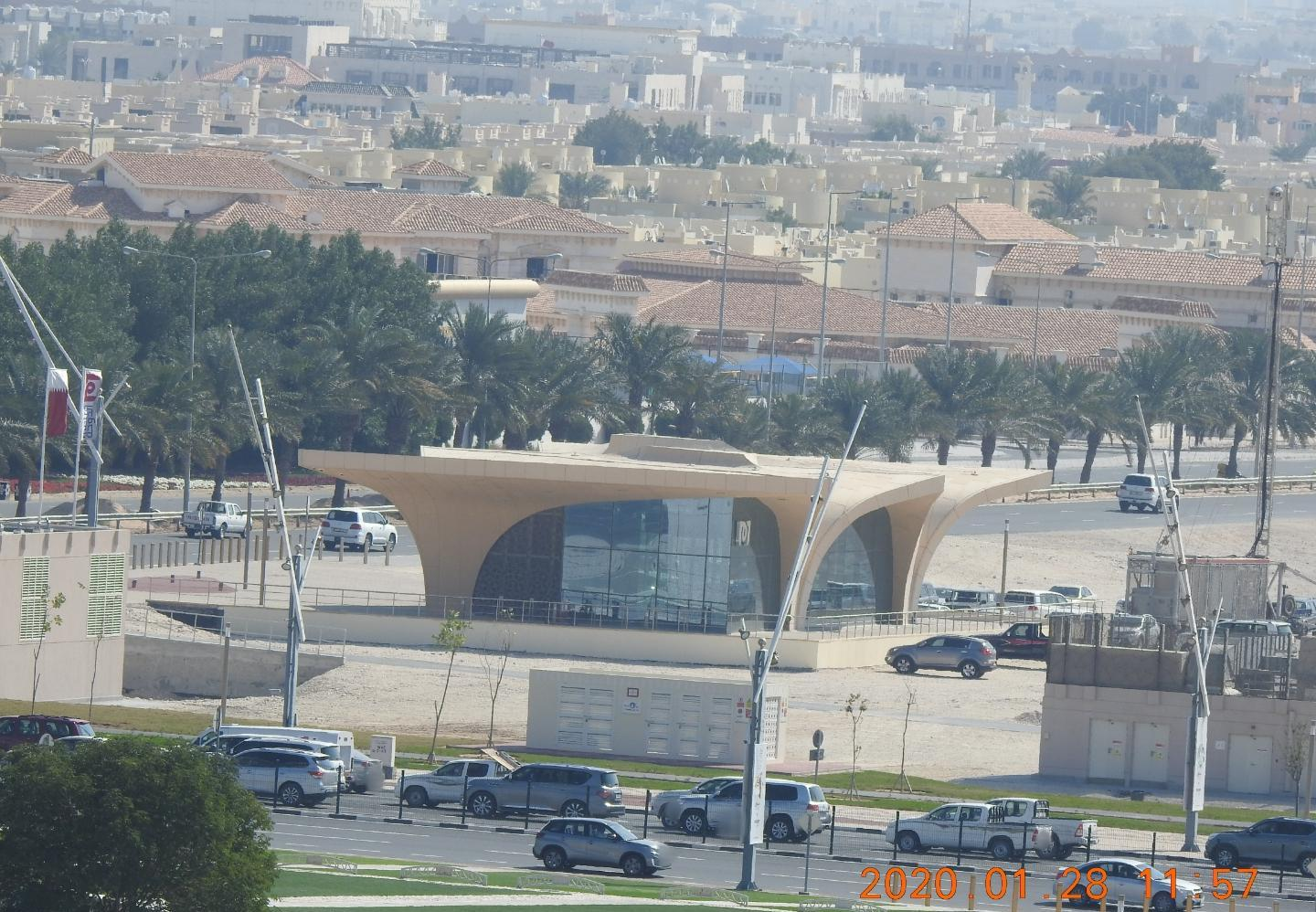
- View of the Sport City Metro Station with Al Waab in the background

- Al Waab
- Coordinates: 25°15′32″N 51°28′3″E
- Country: Qatar
- Municipality: Al Rayyan
- Zone: Zone 55
- District no.: 83

Area
  - Total: 4.6 km^{2} (1.8 sq mi)
- Elevation: 23 m (75 ft)

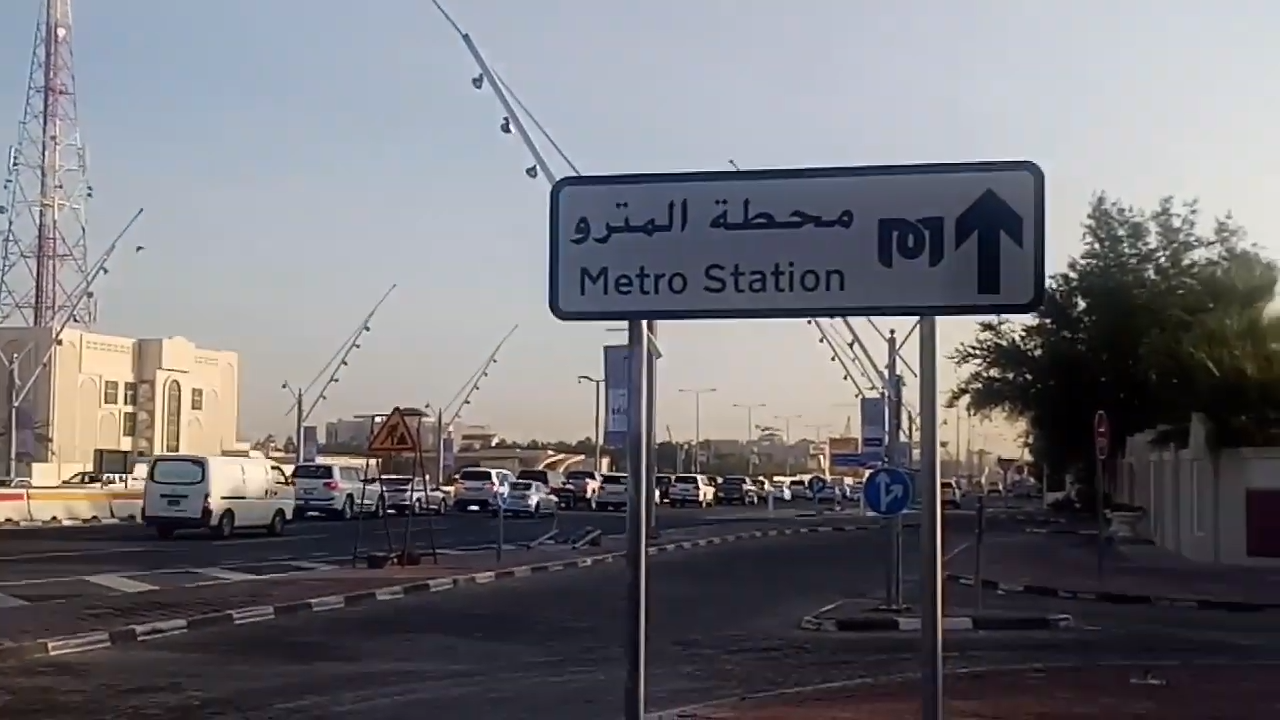
Sign indicating the metro station on Al Waab Street.

Al Waab (Arabic: الوعب, romanized: Al Wa‘b) is a district in the municipality of Al Rayyan in Qatar. The district has witnessed tremendous growth beginning in the mid-1990s, resulting in the construction of numerous residential compounds to house expatriates, villas, and commercial and medical developments. It is a district of Al Rayyan City, which, in turn, is a part of the Doha Metropolitan Area.

Located roughly 10 kilometres (6.2 mi) from the Doha city center, the district is located next to some of Doha's most popular attractions such as the Aspire Zone and Villaggio Mall, both of which are located on Al Waab Street in neighboring Baaya. Gated compounds are very common in this district, numbering at 21 in 2016. Several Western-curriculum schools are located in or adjacent to the district, such as Doha College, Newton International School, and the American School of Doha.

== Etymology ==
The Arabic word waab translates to "vast area that accommodates things". It was given this name for its greenery, level topography and fertile soil.

== Landmarks ==
- Al-Hayat Medical Center on Al Waab Street.
- South Al Soudan Park on Al Saham Street.

== Sports ==
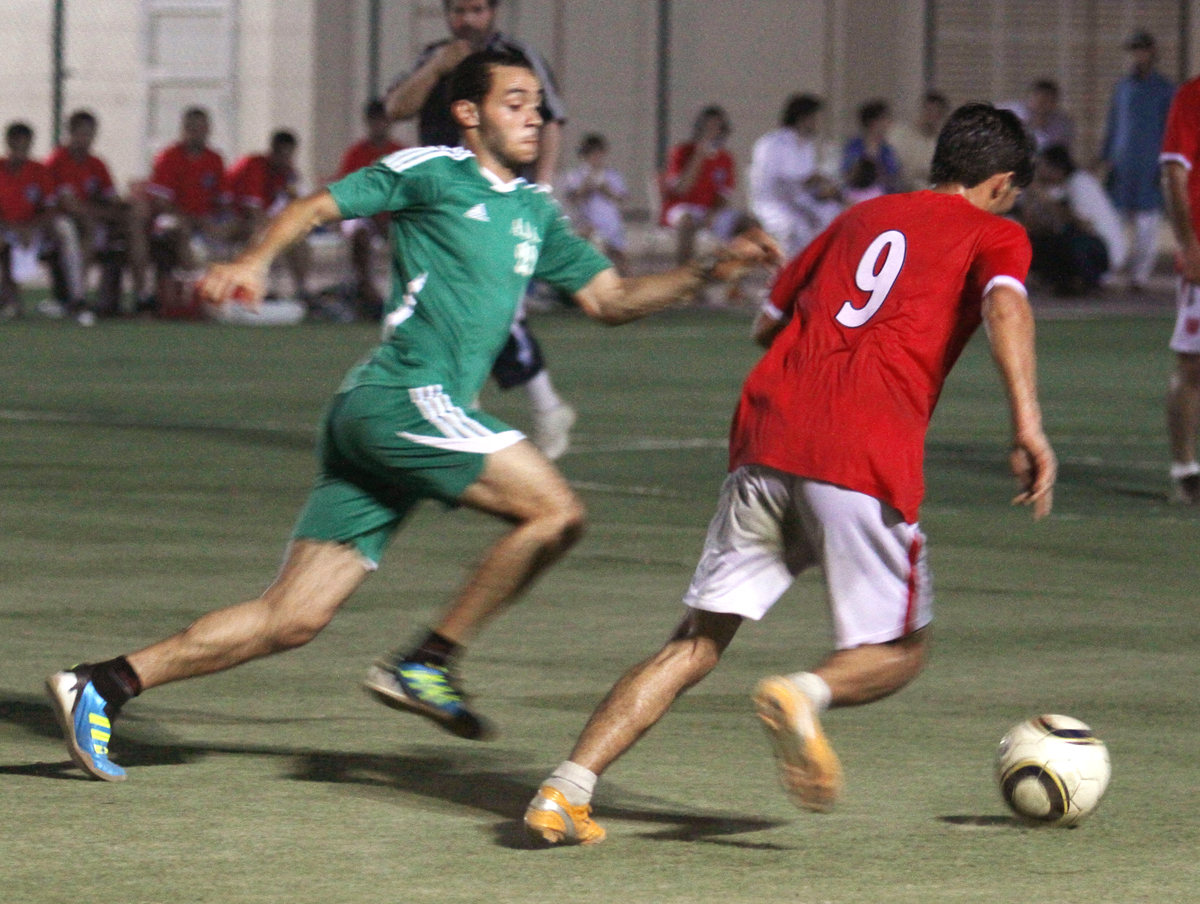
Al Waab (in green) vs Khyber in Qatar's amateur football league.

Currently, the district is represented by the Al Waab FC, a football club competing in the QFA-sanctioned Qatar Amateur League. The club won the inaugural league title in 2014, having dominated the competition since the early stages. Their colors are green and white.

== Education ==
The district features a number of schools, including the Doha College, American School of Doha (on the border with Fereej Al Soudan), and Doha Academy. Other schools include:

Name of School	Curriculum	Grade	Genders	Official Website	Ref
Al Noor Language Kindergarten	International	Kindergarten	Both	N/A	
Lycée Franco-Qatarien Voltaire - Al Waab branch	International	Primary – Secondary	Both	Official website	
Newton International School - Al Waab branch	International	Kindergarten – Secondary	Male-only	Official website	

== Transport ==
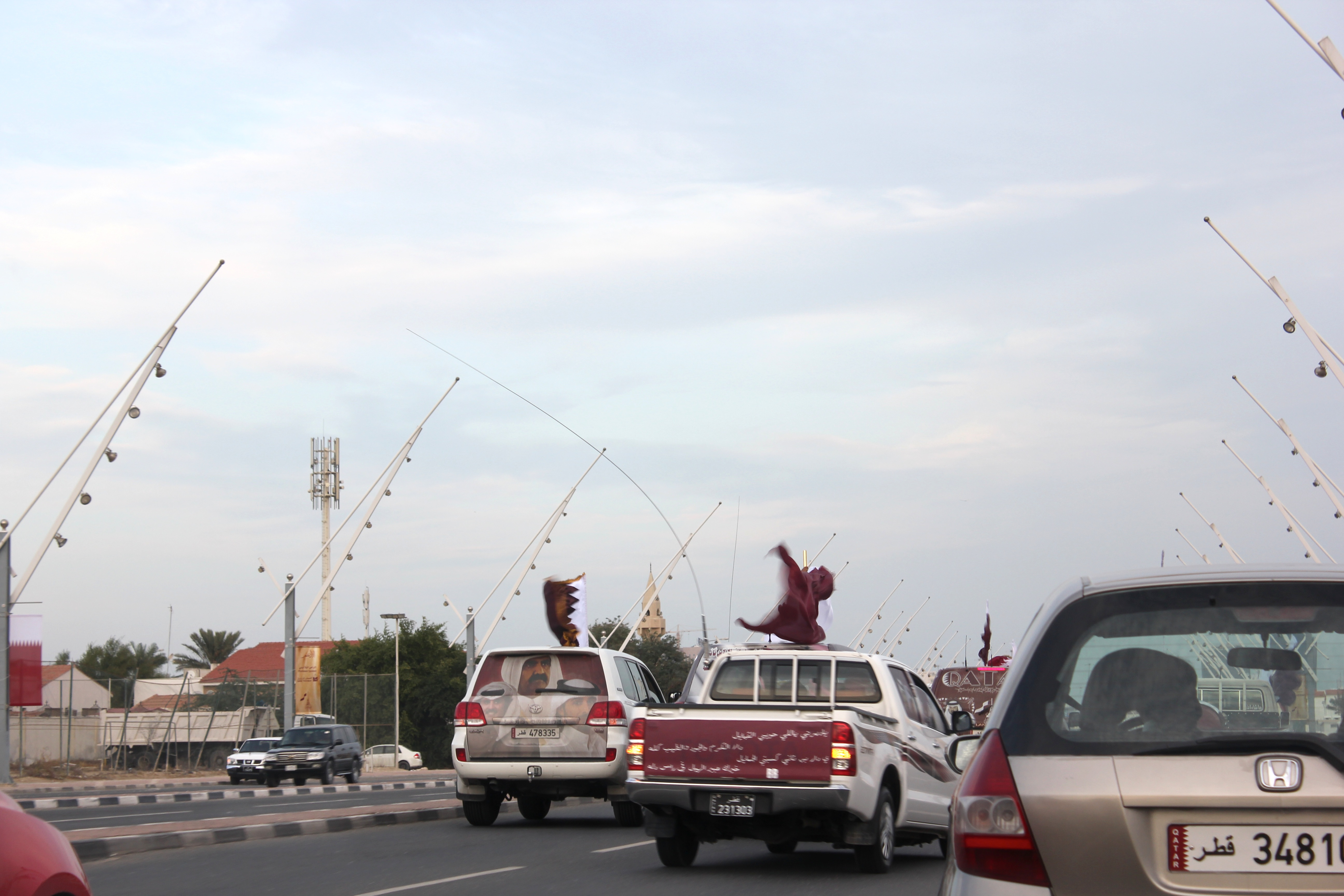
Al Waab Street during the 2012 Qatar National Day.

=== Road ===
Main roads that run through the district include Sports City Street, Al Waab Street, Wholesale Market Street and Salwa Road. Al Waab Street is typified by its unique arching streetlights and provides a route to the Al Shamal Highway, while Sports City Street provides access to the Aspire Zone. The Wholesale Market Street connects to Abu Hamour and its livestock markets to the south.

Public bus stops operated by Karwa are provided on Sports City Street and Al Waab Street.

=== Rail ===
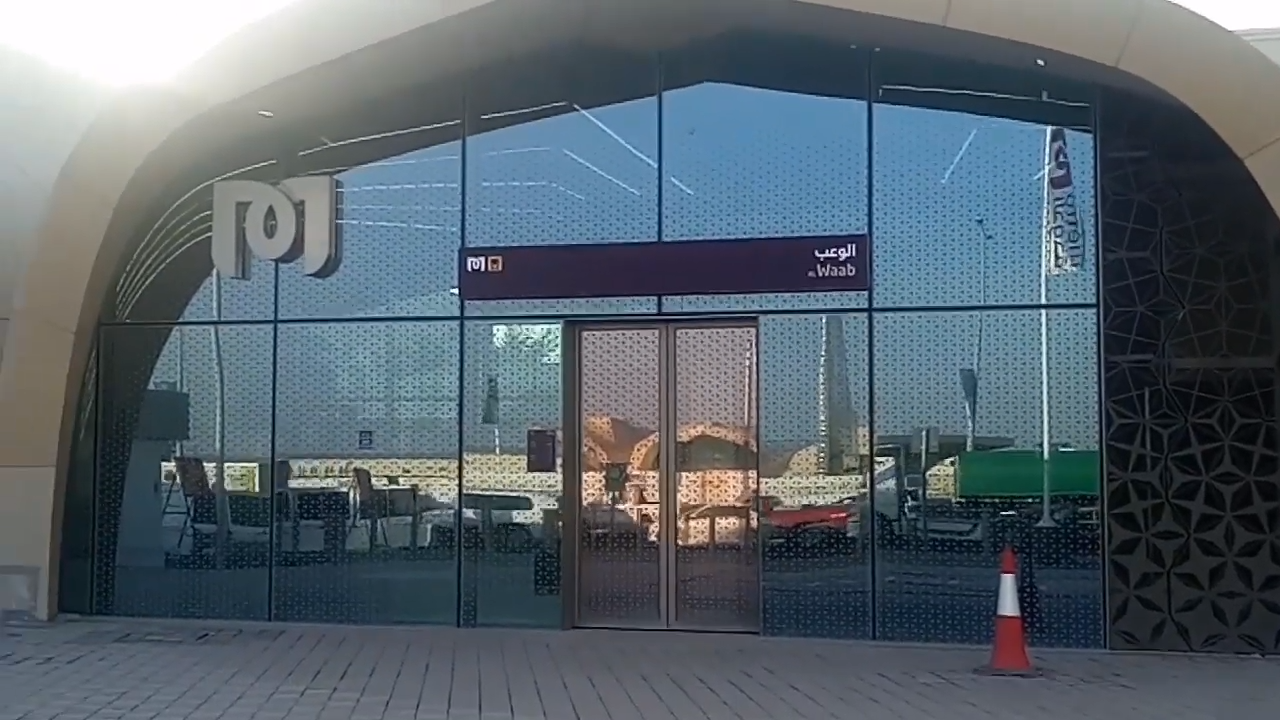
Entrance to Al Waab metro station.

The underground Al Waab QLM station currently serves the Gold Line of the Doha Metro. As part of the metro's Phase 1, the station was inaugurated on 25 November 2019 along with the other Gold Line stations. It is located on Al Waab Street.

Among the station's facilities are a prayer room and restrooms. There are currently no metrolinks for the station.

Two other stations which are nearby are Sport City station, which is also located on Al Waab Street, and the Al Aziziyah station , which starts near the Villaggio Mall and is also accessible through Al Waab Street, which it will run under.

== Developments ==
=== Al Waab City ===
Al Waab City, a real estate development currently being constructed in the district, is set to add 639 villas, 1,293 apartments, and 425 hotel rooms to the district. It is planned to accommodate over 8,000 people. The planned city will have three main districts: the Northern District, the Central District and the Southern District.

In the Northern District, residences, clubhouses and playgrounds will be the main focus of its two communities, Nour Al Waab and Janayin Al Waab. The former community consists of 92 large Arabian-style villas, while the latter 181 villas and recreational facilities.

The Central District comprises three communities, namely Jawharat Al Waab, Abraj Al Waab and Riyad Al Waab. It is mainly residence-oriented and is set to feature numerous parks and landscaped walkways. Jawharat Al Waab, set to be the focal point of the development, encompasses 100,000 m² and will host a spa, hotel and several restaurants and boutiques. Apartment buildings will occupy Abraj Al Waab while Riyad Al Waab will feature a mix of townhouses, villas and apartments.

Lastly, the Southern District will cater to businesses of all sizes, and to a smaller extent, will host neighborhoods. Spread over 200,000 m², the communities in this district are Ma'arid Al Waab, Makatib Al Waab, Darat, and Manazil Al Waab. The development will see numerous medium-rise office buildings built in Makatib Al Waab, and similarly, Ma'arid Al Waab, which runs along Salwa Road, is set to accommodate numerous offices and retailers. The remaining two communities, Manazil Al Waab and Darat, are residential, with the former containing apartments and the latter containing villas.

With an estimated completion date of late 2020, the total cost of the project amounts to roughly $3.2 billion.
