= Al Aziziya =

Al Aziziya العزيزية
- District
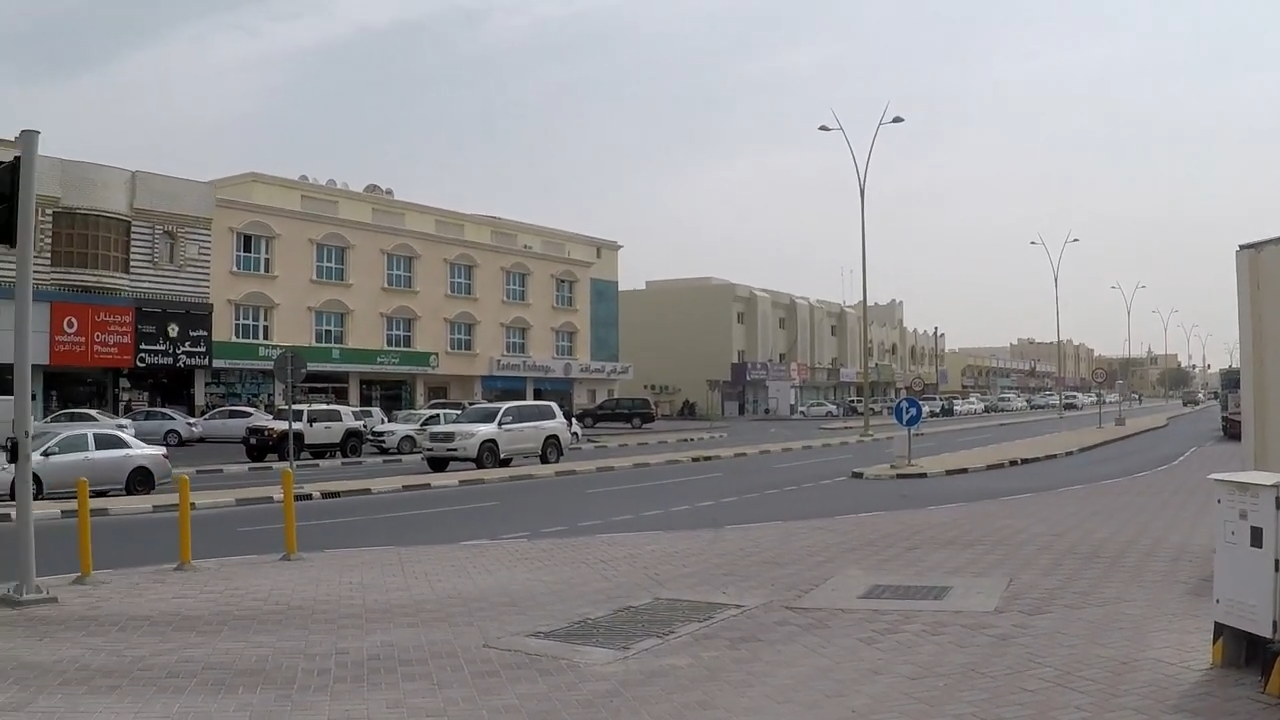
- Shops on Al Aziziya Street running through the center of Al Aziziya.

- Location within Qatar
- Coordinates: 25°15′20″N 51°25′52″E
- Country: Qatar
- Municipality: Al Rayyan
- Zone: Zone 55
- District no.: 84

Area
  - Total: 5.7 km^{2} (2.2 sq mi)
- Elevation: 21 m (69 ft)

Al Aziziya (Arabic: العزيزية) is a district in the municipality of Al Rayyan in Qatar, located on the outskirts of Doha, in Zone 55.

== Landmarks ==
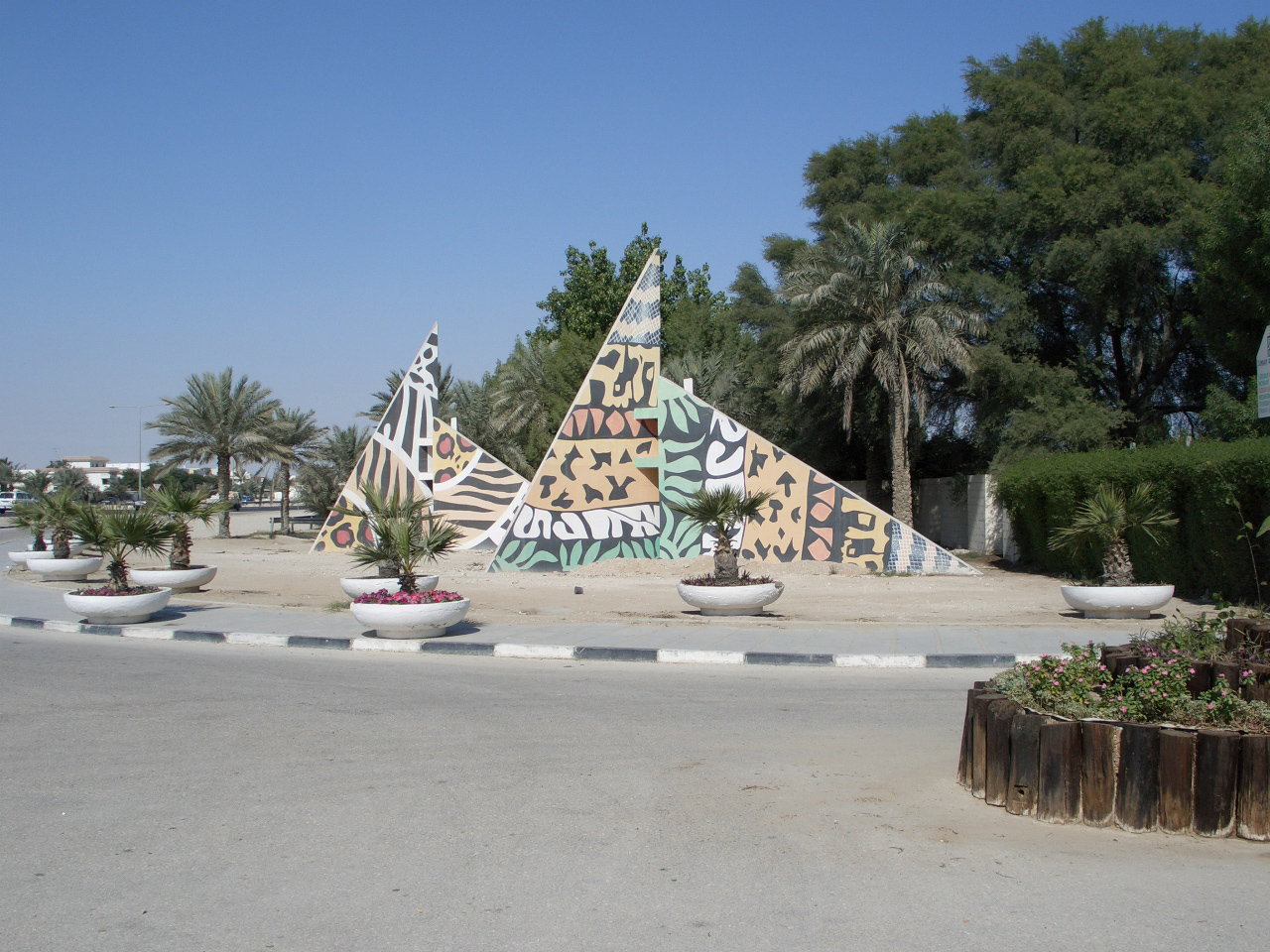
Doha Zoo in Al Aziziya in 2006.

- The Qatar Center for Voluntary Activities was established in the district in July 2001. It encourages volunteer work among the nation's youth and is responsible for organizing large-scale events for volunteers.
- Fereej Aziziya Stadium, managed by the Qatar Olympic Committee, is located on Al Wasl Street.
- Aziziya Commercial Complex is located on Al Aziziya Street.
- Aziziya Family Park is located on Al Andab Street.
- Aziziya Medical Complex is found on Salwa Road.
- Both The Ministry of Interior's General Directorate of Civil Defence and Qatar Charity maintain branches in Al Aziziya.
- Doha Zoo is situated on Al Furousiya Street in Al Aziziya. It was opened in the 1980s as Qatar's first zoo. In 2013, it was announced that the zoo would be converted into a safari park at a cost of approximately $55 million.

== Transport ==
The underground Al Aziziyah Metro Station currently serves the Gold Line, having been launched during Phase 1.

== Education ==
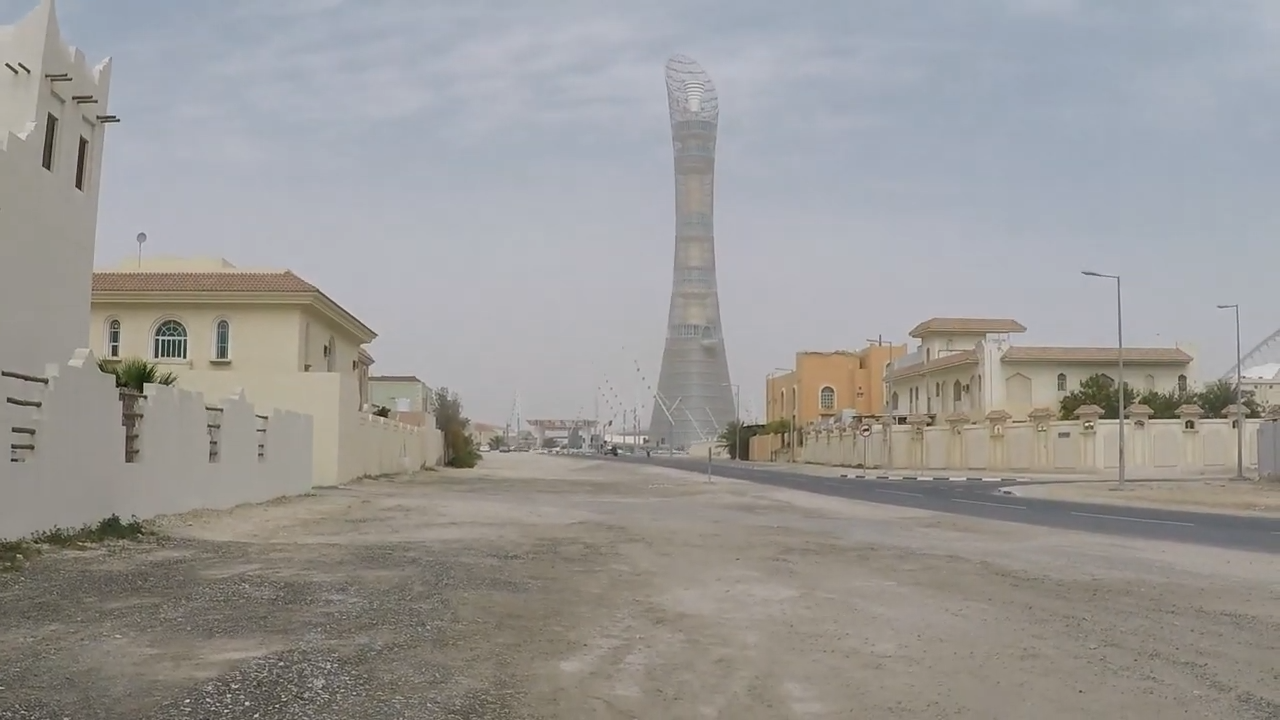
Al Awali Street in Al Aziziya.

The following schools are located in Al Aziziya:

Name of School	Curriculum	Grade	Genders	Official Website	Ref
Abdulla Bin Turky Model Independent Boys	Independent	Kindergarten – Primary	Male-only	N/A	
Al Aziziya Private Kindergarten	Independent	Kindergarten	Both	N/A	
Al Israa Primary Independent Girls	Independent	Kindergarten – Primary	Female-only	N/A	
Cairo Private School For Boys	International	Kindergarten – Secondary	Male-only	N/A	
Cairo Private School For Girls	International	Kindergarten – Secondary	Female-only	N/A	
Elite International School	International	Kindergarten – Secondary	Both	N/A	
Iqraa English School For Boys	International	Primary	Male-only	Official website	
