= Al Sailiya =

Al Sailiya السيلية
- District
- Location within Qatar
- Coordinates: 25°13′08″N 51°22′47″E
- Country: Qatar
- Municipality: Al Rayyan
- Zone: Zone 55
- District no.: 91

Area
  - Total: 28.2 km^{2} (10.9 sq mi)
- Elevation: 35 m (115 ft)

Al Sailiya (Arabic: السيلية, romanized: As Saylīyah) is a district of Al Rayyan City in Qatar, located in the municipality of Al Rayyan.

== Etymology ==
The word sailiya is derived from the Arabic term sayl, which translates as "to flow". It gained this name from the fact that part of the district is situated in a rawda (depression) which acts as a floodplain.

== History ==
J.G. Lorimer's wrote an account of Al Sailiya in 1908 in his Gazetteer of the Persian Gulf. He describes it as a "stage on the route from Hofuf to Dohah" and lies 13 miles south-west from Doha. He also remarked on the presence of a masonry well yielding good water.

== Landmarks ==
- Al-Sailiya SC headquarters on Masaken Al Attiyah Street.
- Fereej Al Sailiya Stadium on Street 333.
- Al Sailiya Electricity Station (managed by Kahramaa) on Rawdat Umm Salamah Street.
- Al Sailiya Reserve for Falcons on Al Sailiya Road.
- Al Sailiya Park on Street 271.
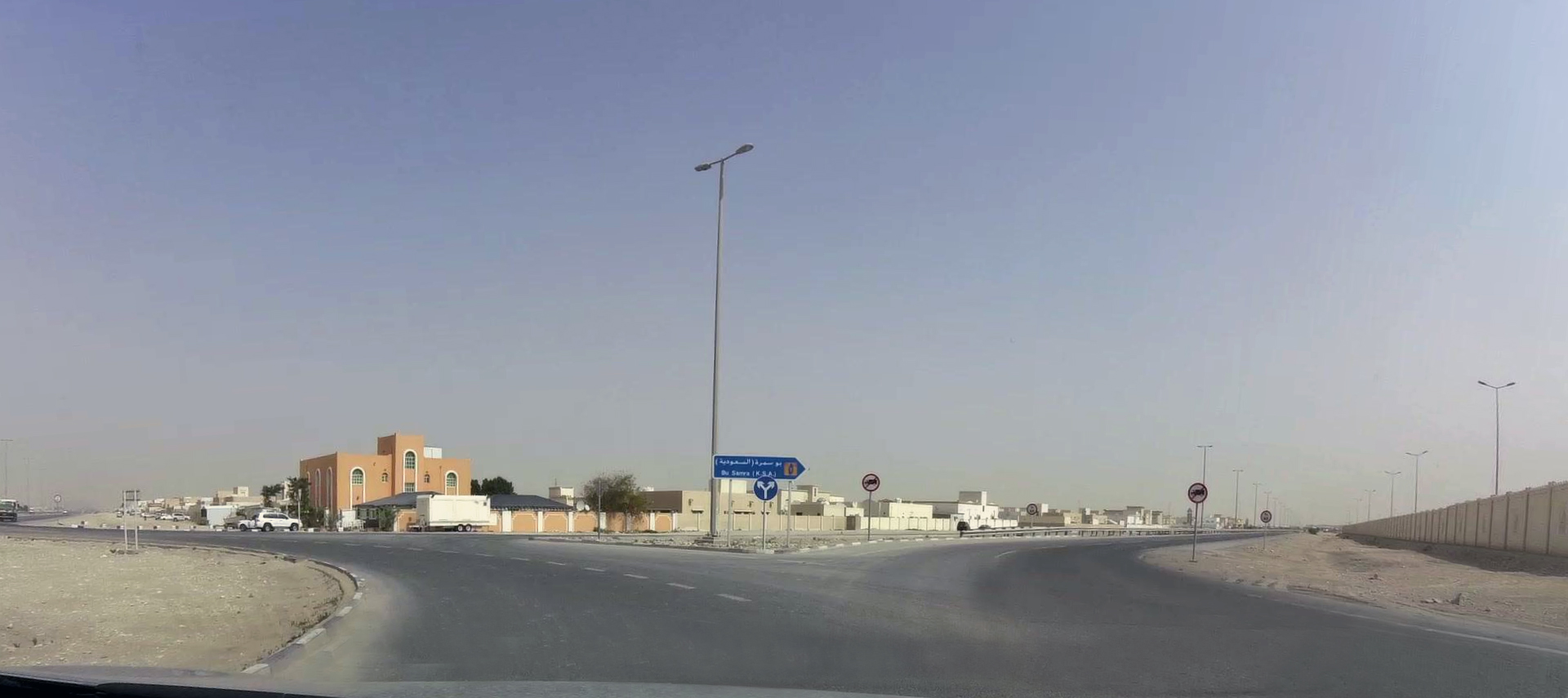
Al Sailiya Roundabout in 2017

== As Sayliyah Army Base ==
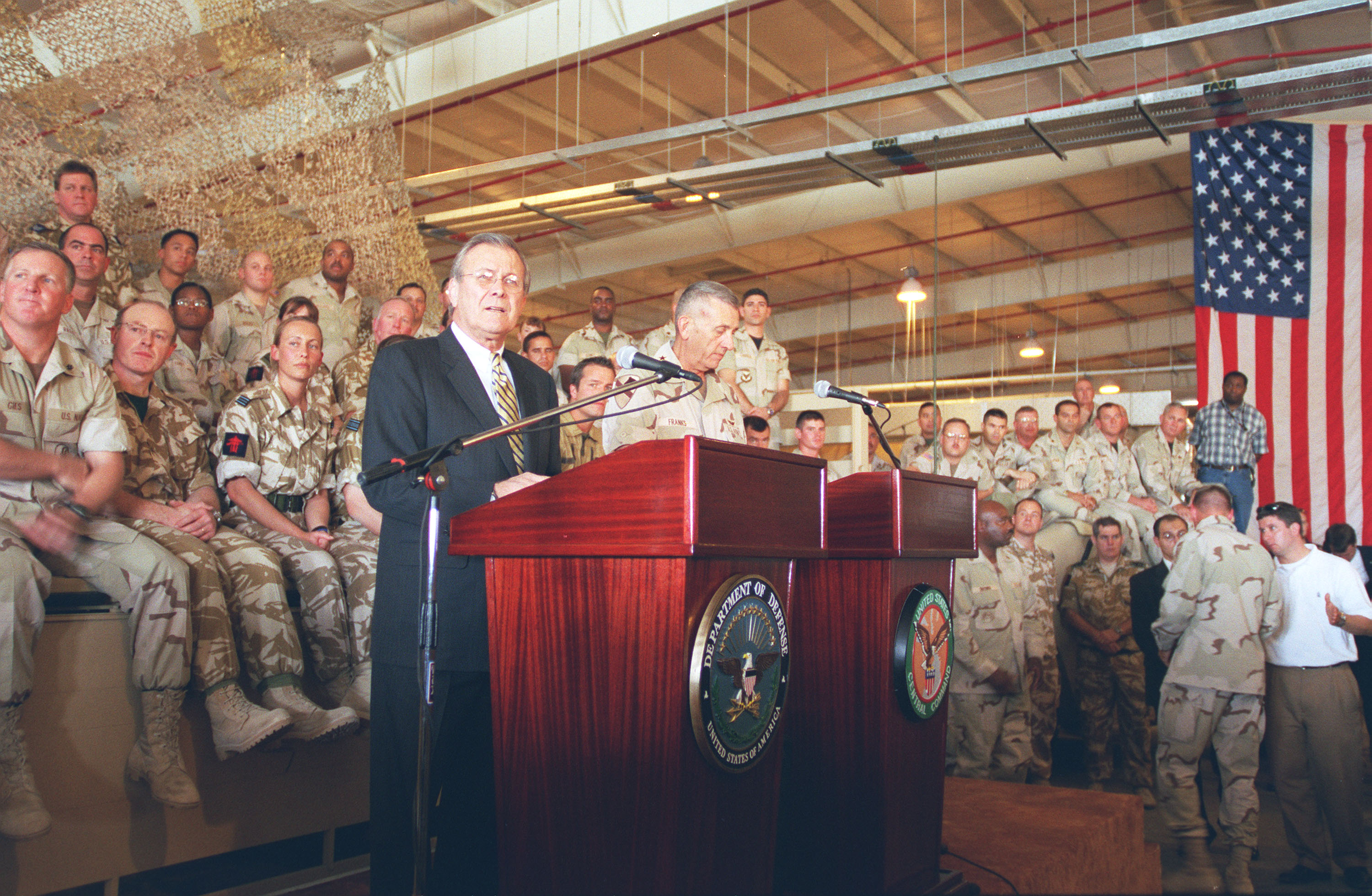
US Secretary of Defense Donald Rumsfeld during a town meeting at As Sayliyah Army Base in 2002

In 2000, the US opened a military base in Al Sailiya at a cost of $110 million. There are roughly 27 warehouses with a combined storage space of around 1.6 million square feet. The US Army established 10 km of roads in the facility. It was closed in June 2021, with the US base shifting to Jordan.

== Sports ==
Al-Sailiya SC, a multi-sports club best known for its football team, has its headquarters in the district. There is also a small neighborhood (fereej) stadium in the district administered by the Qatar Olympic Committee, known as Fereej Al Sailiya Stadium.
