= Tarina =

Tarina may refer to:

== People with the given name ==
- Tarina, a woman that the village of Traina in Qatar was named after
- Tarina Patel, South African actress, film producer, and model
- Tarina Tarantino (born 1969), American jewelry designer

== Other ==
- Țarina, a village in Roșia Montană Commune, Alba County, Romania
- Țarina mine, a mine in Romania
