= Umm Besher =

Umm Besher أم بشر
- District
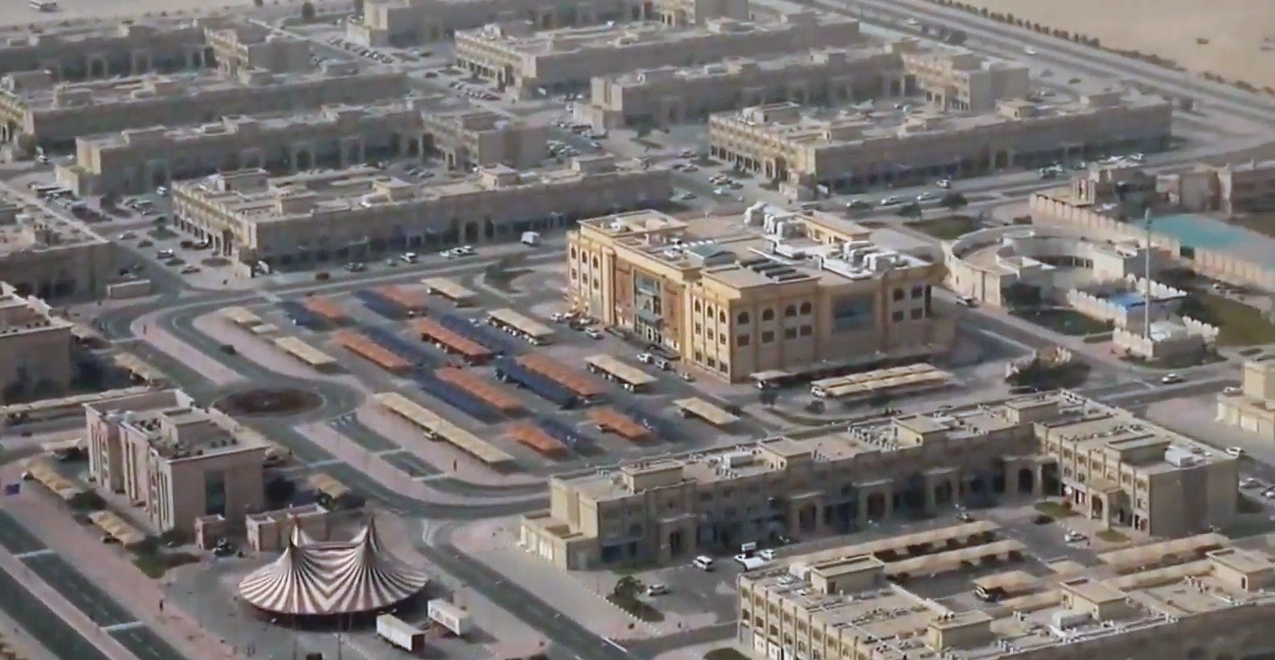
- Aerial view of Umm Besher in 2014 with CentrePoint Mall in focus

- Location in Qatar
- Coordinates: 25.200897°N 51.565843°E
- Country: Qatar
- Municipality: Al Wakrah
- Zone: Zone 91
- District no.: 767

Area
  - Total: 13.0 km^{2} (5.0 sq mi)

Umm Besher (Arabic: أم بشر; also known as Barwa Village) is a district located in the municipality of Al Wakrah in Qatar, near the municipality's border with Doha.

It borders Al Thumama to the north, Ras Abu Fontas to the east, Al Mashaf to the south and Jery Musabbeh to the west. Barwa Village, a city-scale initiative by Barwa Group, is located here. Completed in 2010, Barwa Village comprises 18 mixed-use complexes with over 450 residential units and 900 commercial spaces. Contained within it are most modern amenities, including a health clinic, a shopping center, an international school, and parks.

== Landmarks ==
- CentrePoint Shopping Mall
- Atlas Medical Clinic

== Education ==
- Shantiniketan Indian School
- Pearl School at Umm Besher
