= Abu Sulba =

Abu Sulba بو صلبة
- District
- Location in Qatar
- Coordinates: 25.0760°N 51.4526°E
- Country: Qatar
- Municipality: Al Wakrah
- Zone: Zone 91
- District no.: 646

Area
  - Total: 8.6 sq mi (22.4 km^{2})

Abu Sulba (Arabic: بو صلبة, romanized: Abū Şalbah) is a district in Qatar located in the municipality of Al Wakrah. The Gulf Warehousing Company established the GWC Bu Sulba Warehousing Park on a 520,000 square meter site.

Nearby settlements include Birkat Al Awamer to the south, Muaither village to the east and Al Wukair to the northeast.

== Etymology ==
Abu is Arabic for "father" and is a common prefix for geographic locations. The second constituent is derived from the Arabic term salb which means "solid land". This name was chosen for the area because of its hard soil surface.
