= Zone 90, Qatar =

Zone 90
- Zone
- Interactive map of Zone 90
- Coordinates: 25.121429°N 51.596212°E
- Country: Qatar
- Municipality: Al Wakrah
- Blocks: 171

Area
  - Total: 75.8 km^{2} (29.3 sq mi)

Population
  - Total: 87,970 (2,015)
- Time zone: UTC+03 (Arabia Standard Time)
- ISO 3166 code: QA-WA

Zone 90 is a zone of the municipality of Al Wakrah in the state of Qatar. The main district recorded in the 2015 population census was the municipal seat, Al Wakrah City.

Other districts which fall within its administrative boundaries are the Al Wakrah Industrial Area and Umm Al Houl.

== Demographics ==
Year	Population
1986	12,092
1997	19,009
2004	26,579
2010	58,965
2015	87,970

== Land use ==
The Ministry of Municipality and Environment (MME) breaks down land use in the zone as follows.

Area (km^{2})	Developed land (km^{2})	Undeveloped land (km^{2})	Residential (km^{2})	Commercial/ Industrial (km^{2})	Education/ Health (km^{2})	Farming/ Green areas (km^{2})	Other uses (km^{2})
75.80	38.35	37.45	5.22	1.85	0.74	0.05	30.49
