= Zone 91, Qatar =

Zone 91
- Zone
- Interactive map of Zone 91
- Coordinates: 25.131681°N 51.497065°E
- Country: Qatar
- Municipality: Al Wakrah
- Blocks: 305

Area
  - Total: 203.4 km^{2} (78.5 sq mi)

Population
  - Total: 165,214 (2,015)
- Time zone: UTC+03 (Arabia Standard Time)
- ISO 3166 code: QA-WA

Zone 91 is a zone of the municipality of Al Wakrah in the state of Qatar. The main districts recorded in the 2015 population census were Al Thumama, Al Wukair, and Al Mashaf.

Other districts which fall within its administrative boundaries are Abu Sulba, Barwa Al Baraha, Birkat Al Awamer, Muaither Al Wukair, and Wadi Aba Seleel.

== Demographics ==
Year	Population
1986	2,570
1997	3,177
2004	4,083
2010	20,615
2015	165,214

== Land use ==
The Ministry of Municipality and Environment (MME) breaks down land use in the zone as follows.

Area (km^{2})	Developed land (km^{2})	Undeveloped land (km^{2})	Residential (km^{2})	Commercial/ Industrial (km^{2})	Education/ Health (km^{2})	Farming/ Green areas (km^{2})	Other uses (km^{2})
203.36	70.92	132.44	5.82	2.48	0.13	4.94	57.55
