= Al Wakrah (municipality) =

Municipality in Qatar

Al Wakrah Municipality بلدية الوكرة
- Municipality
- Map of Qatar with Al Wakrah highlighted
- Coordinates (Al Wakrah): 25°10′48″N 51°36′36″E
- Country: Qatar
- Capital: Al Wakrah city
- Zones: 7

Government
  - Director: Mansour Ajran Al-Buainain

Area
  - Municipality: 2,577.7 km^{2} (995.3 sq mi)

Population (2015)
  - Municipality: 299,037
  - Density: 116.01/km^{2} (300.46/sq mi)
- Time zone: UTC+03 (East Africa Time)
- ISO 3166 code: QA-WA

Al Wakrah Municipality (Arabic: بلدية الوكرة, romanized: Baladīyat al-Wakrah, also spelled Al Wakra Municipality) is a municipality of Qatar bordered by the municipalities of Doha and Al Rayyan. The municipal seat is Al Wakrah city.

== Etymology ==
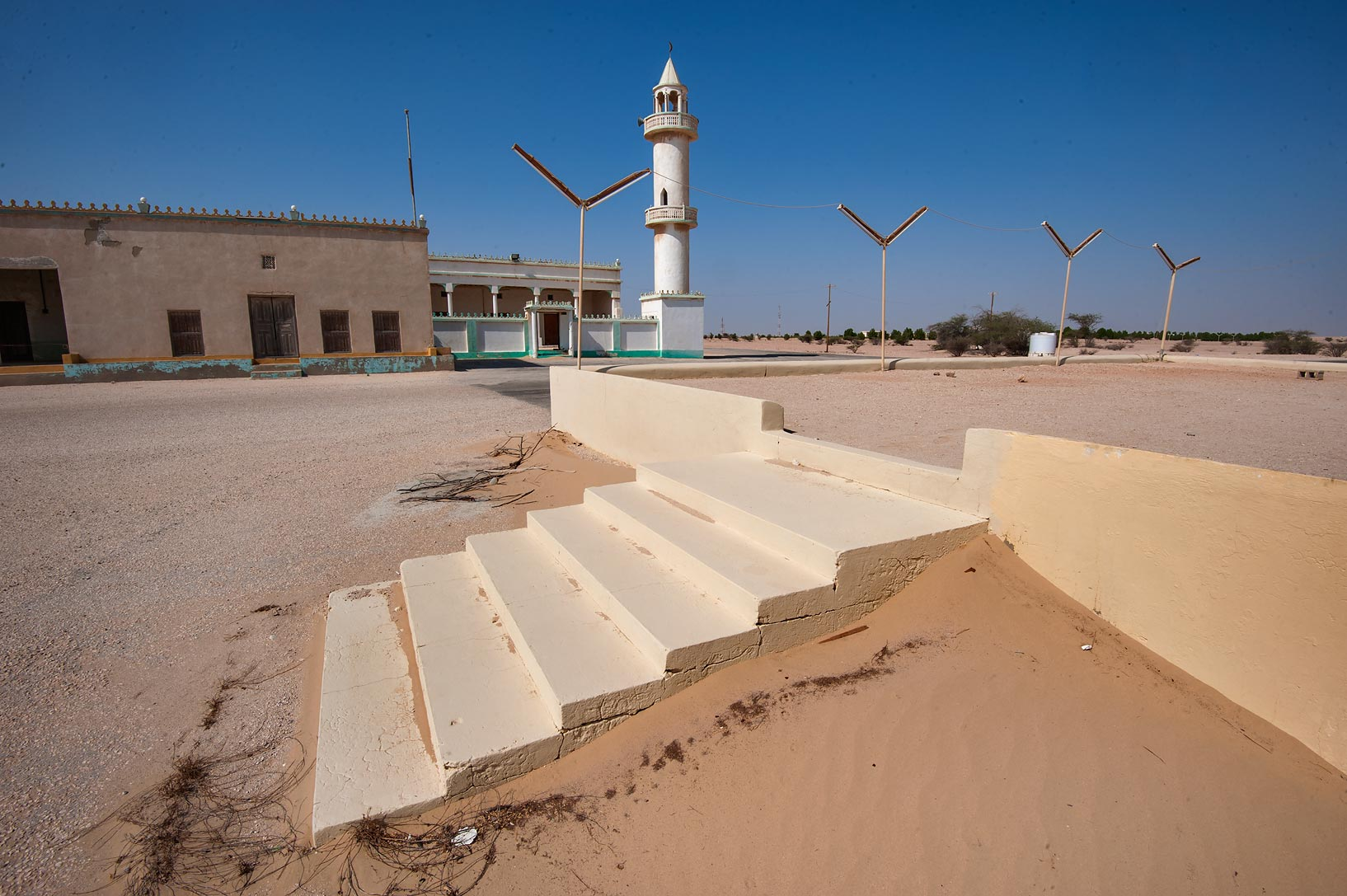
A mosque in the central square of Traina.

The municipality was named after the city of Al Wakrah, which derives its name from the Arabic word wakar, which roughly translates to "bird nest". According to the Ministry of Municipality and Environment, this name was given in reference to a nearby hill which accommodated the nests of several birds.

== History ==
On 17 July 1972, the creation of the municipalities of Ar Rayyan, Al Wakrah, Al Khawr and Thakhira, Al Shamal, and Umm Salal were issued. This law identified Al Wakrah Municipality as a legal district. The municipal board has a president and four members. The current president of the Municipal board is Mansour Ajran Al-Buainain.

== Geography ==
The southern end of Al Wakrah is characterized by dense sand dunes. Unlike northern Qatar where most areas lie close to sea level, much of the southern and central portions of Al Wakrah are 40 to 60 m (130 to 200 ft) above sea level. Water is scarce in most areas as the water table is relatively low. Although there are some depressions, they are rare when compared to northern Qatar. Furthermore, the southern groundwater is often saline. As a result, permanent settlements were few and far between, with some exceptions being found at Al Kharrara, Traina and Al Furayah north of Khor Al Adaid.

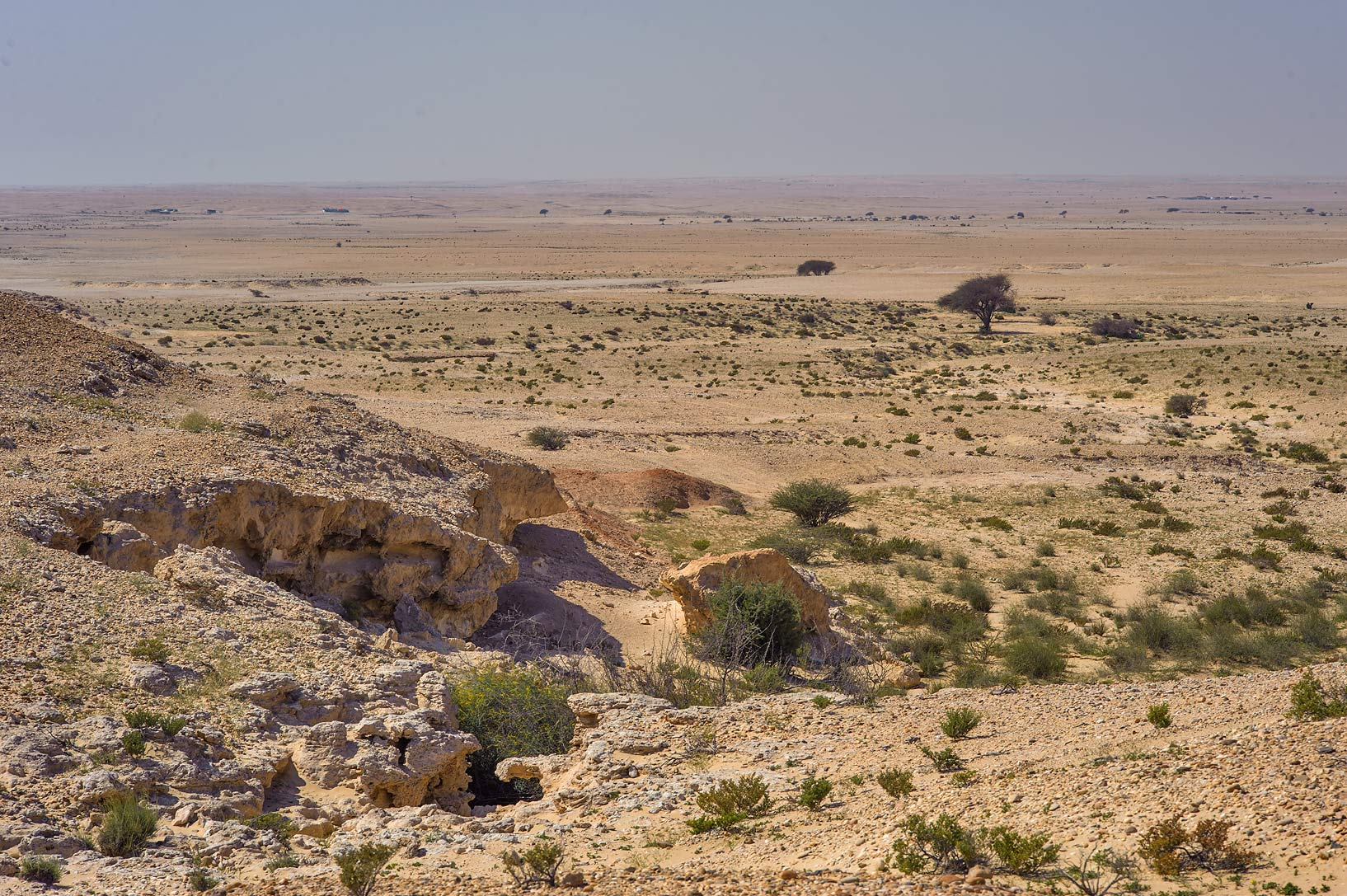
Limestone escarpments near Al Kharrara.

Many nomadic camps were created in Al Wakrah's south in past times; these sites can often be identified by the presence of small, open mosques. It is likely that Bedouins visited the region mainly during times of suitable weather, such as the rainy season. Herdsman were able to nourish their camels with the saline water, which would, in turn, yield drinkable milk.

According to the Ministry of Municipality and Environment (MME), the municipality accommodates 192 depressions, 13 wadis, four streams, seven plains, 14 hills, four highlands, seven sabkhas, four bays, and three coral reefs. The only cape recorded here is Ras Al Maharef. Two islands are found off its shores; Sheraouh Island and Al Aszhat Island. One of the most prominent of its hills is Jebel Al Wakrah, an 26 m (85 ft) high rocky hill located 1.6 km (1 mi) south of the city of Al Wakrah. The Naqiyan Hill Range dominates the southern quarter of the municipality in Khor Al Adaid.

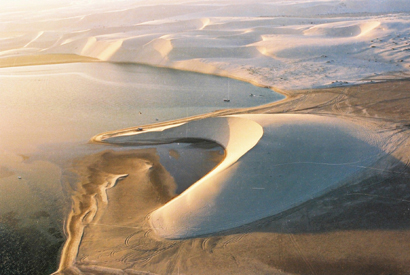
Sand dunes at Khor Al Adaid.

=== Protected areas ===
The UNESCO-recognized Khor Al Adaid is Qatar's largest nature reserve and is located on the south-east corner of the municipality. Also known by its English name Inland Sea, the area was declared a nature reserve in 2007 and occupies an area of approximately 1,833 km^{2} (708 sq mi). Historically, the area was used for camel grazing by nomads, and is still used for the same purpose to a lesser extent. Various flora and fauna are supported in its ecosystem, such as ospreys, dugongs and turtles. The appearance and quick formation of its sabkhas is distinct from any other system of sabkhas, as is the continuous infilling of its lagoon.

=== Climate ===
The following is climate data for the city of Mesaieed, south of the capital Al Wakrah City.

Climate data for Mesaieed
Month	Jan	Feb	Mar	Apr	May	Jun	Jul	Aug	Sep	Oct	Nov	Dec	Year
Mean daily maximum °C (°F)	20 (68)	22 (72)	25 (77)	30 (86)	36 (97)	38 (100)	38 (100)	37 (99)	34 (93)	32 (90)	27 (81)	20 (68)	30 (86)
Mean daily minimum °C (°F)	11 (52)	12 (54)	15 (59)	18 (64)	23 (73)	25 (77)	26 (79)	27 (81)	24 (75)	21 (70)	17 (63)	11 (52)	19 (67)
Average precipitation mm (inches)	10 (0.4)	2 (0.1)	2.5 (0.10)	6 (0.2)	1 (0.0)	0 (0)	0 (0)	0 (0)	0 (0)	0.5 (0.02)	13.5 (0.53)	24 (0.9)	59.5 (2.25)
Average relative humidity (%)	69	66	55	51	43	41	48	62	60	64	65	70	58
Source: Qatar Statistics Authority

== Administration ==
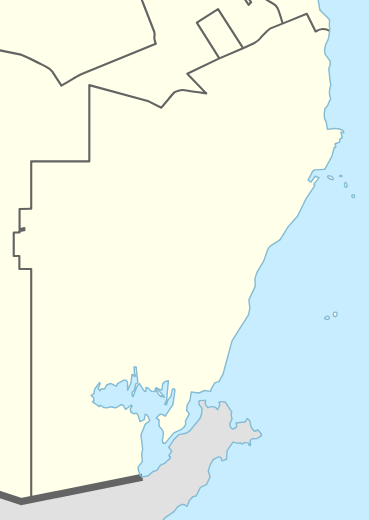
Approximate locations of the main districts in Al Wakrah.

Al Wakrah Municipality was established in 1972 and supervises the city of Al Wakrah and other settlements in the municipality. The municipality has four sections: Financial and Administrative Affairs Section, Health Affairs Section, General Affairs Section and the Technical Affairs Section. Al Thumama is geographically located in both Al Wakrah Municipality and Doha Municipality.

The municipality is divided into 7 zones which are then divided into 1,410 blocks.

=== Administrative zones ===
The following administrative zones are found in Al Wakrah Municipality:

Zone no.	Census districts	Area	Population (2015)
90	Al Wakrah	75.8 km^{2} (29.3 sq mi)	87,970
91	Al Thumama; Al Wukair; Al Mashaf	203.4 km^{2} (78.5 sq mi)	165,214
92	Mesaieed	133.2 km^{2} (51.4 sq mi)	37,548
93	Mesaieed Industrial Area	60.7 km^{2} (23.4 sq mi)	106
94	Shagra	497.2 km^{2} (192.0 sq mi)	4,714
95	Al Kharrara	902.4 km^{2} (348.4 sq mi)	3,478
98	Khor Al Adaid	705 km^{2} (272 sq mi)	7
Municipality		2,577.7 km^{2} (995.3 sq mi)	299,037

=== Districts ===
Other settlements in Al Wakrah include:

- Abu Sulba (Arabic: بو صلبة)
- Al Afja Mesaieed (Arabic: العفجة مسيعيد)
- Barwa Al Baraha (Arabic: بروة البراحة)
- Birkat Al Awamer (Arabic: بركة العوامر)
- Muaither Al Wukair (Arabic: معيذر الوكير)
- Ras Abu Fontas (Arabic: راس بو فنطاس)
- Traina (Arabic: ترينة)
- Umm Al Houl (Arabic: ام الحول)
- Umm Besher (Arabic: ام بشر)
- Wadi Aba Seleel (Arabic: وادي ابا الصليل)
- Wadi Jallal (Arabic: وادي جلال)

== Education ==
Public schools in Al Wakrah amounted to 19 in 2016 as recorded in that year's education census – 9 were exclusively for girls and 10 were for boys. The 4,017 male students slightly outnumbered the 3,993 female students.

== Healthcare ==
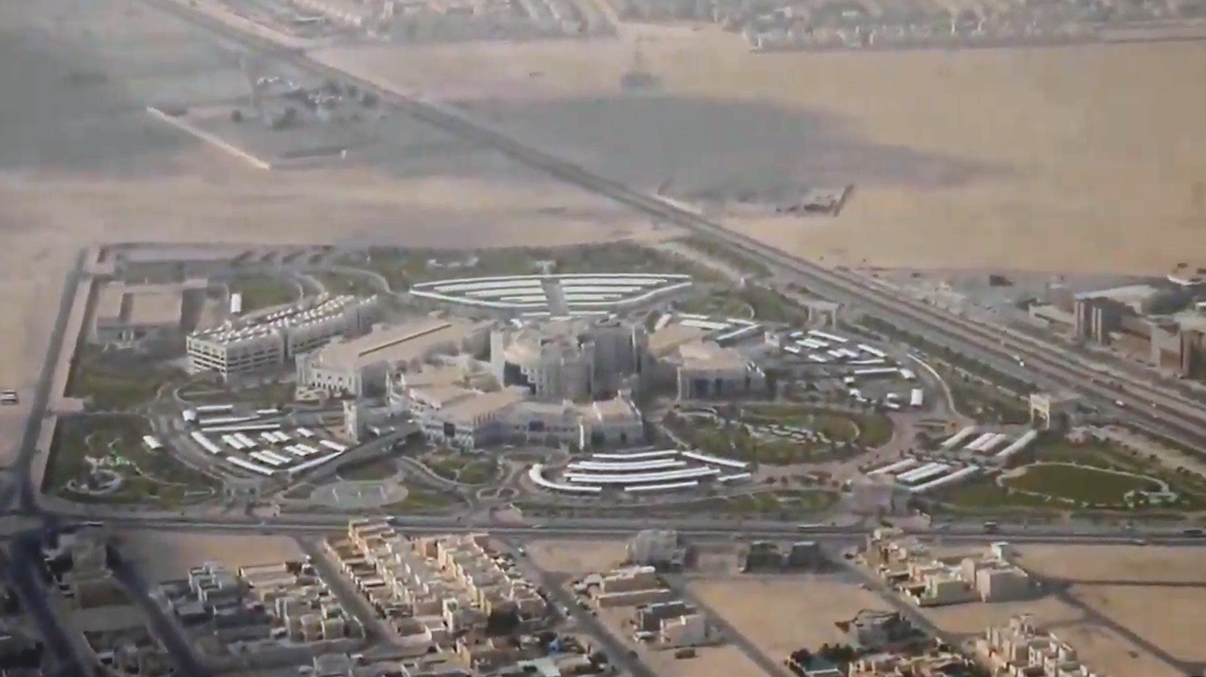
Aerial view of Al Wakrah Hospital in 2014.

According to the 2015 government census, there were 4 registered healthcare facilities in the municipality. Primary healthcare centers are located in Al Wakrah City and Al Thumama. Al Wakrah Hospital was established in 2012 and serves the southern region of the country. It is based in Al Wakrah City and is the largest hospital building in Qatar.

Eleven pharmacies were recorded in the municipality in 2013 by Qatar's Supreme Council of Health.

== Economy ==
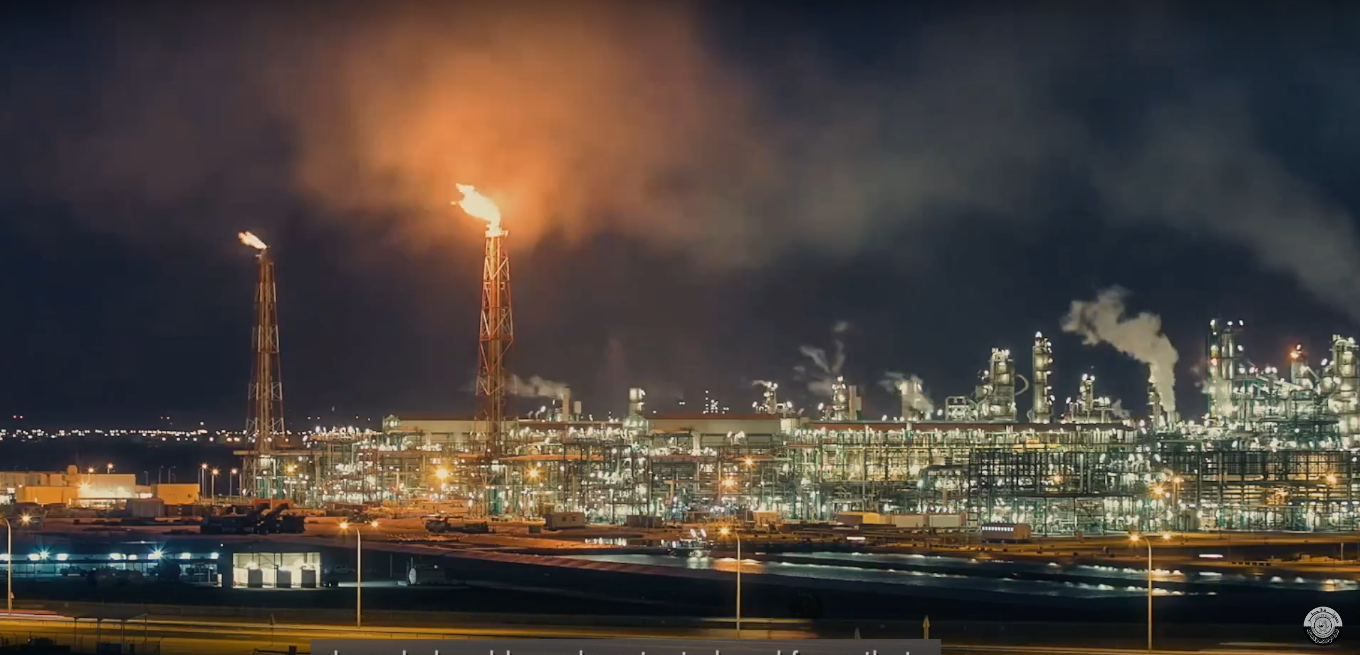
Panoramic view of Mesaieed Industrial Area at night.

Mesaieed Industrial Area, an industry hub, is located in Al Wakrah Municipality. Umm Al Houl, another industrial city located in the municipality which is near to Mesaieed, hosts Qatar's main seaport Hamad Port, and is the site of construction for what will eventually be Qatar's largest electricity and desalination plant. A third industrial area containing some of Qatar's most important power stations and desalination plants is Ras Abu Fontas.

A 6.3 km^{2} (2.4 sq mi) "regional logistics hub" was launched in the southern portion of the municipality in 2016. The development of this hub will take place in Birkat Al Awamer and Aba Saleel, which are in close proximity to Hamad Port and Mesaieed Industrial Area. Among the facilities in this hub will be car workshops, labor camps, and commercial offices. Construction of the hub will be managed by Qatari company Manateq. The Doha Marketing and Services Company established a car stockyard in Birkat Al Awamer with a capacity of 1,700 cars in September 2016.

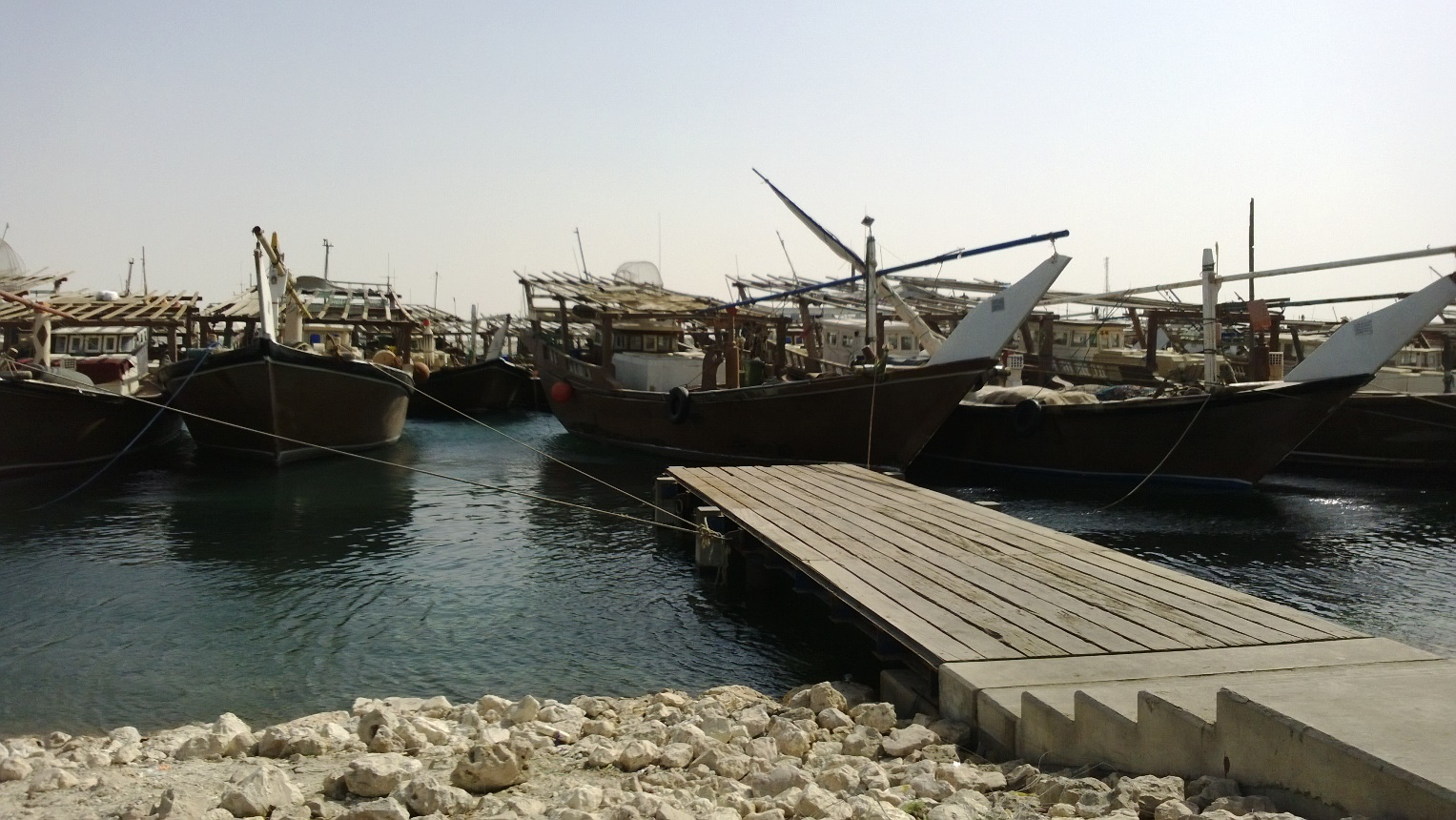
A harbor in Al Wakrah.

Maritime industries such as fishing and pearling comprised the economic foundation of Al Wakrah's coastal settlement in the past. Further inland, nomadic pastoralism dominated. At present, agriculture plays only a minor role in Al Wakrah's economy. Farmland in Al Wakrah only accounted for 4.6% of Qatar's total farmland in 2015. There were 71 farms spread out over 2,188 hectares, with the majority (38) being used to grow crops, 3 being used to raise livestock and the remaining 30 being split between livestock and crops. The municipality had a livestock inventory of 14,946, of which 8,375 were sheep and 6,093 were goats.

In terms of artisanal fishing vessels, Al Wakrah city had the second-highest amount out of the major cities surveyed in 2015 at 179 vessels. However, its fleet has been significantly reduced from earlier years, for earlier in 2010 it had accommodated the most fishing vessels out of all cities surveyed with 237 vessels. The number of sailors was 1,186 in 2015, but this figure too had been decreasing over the years.

== Sports ==
Qatar Stars League team Al-Wakrah SC, founded in 1959, is based in Al Wakrah City. They club plays its home games at the 12,000 capacity Saoud bin Abdulrahman Stadium.

One of the proposed twelve venues for the 2022 FIFA World Cup is projected to be built in Al Wakrah City. Called Al Wakrah Stadium, it has a planned seating capacity of 40,000 and will replace Saoud bin Abdulrahman Stadium as Al Wakrah SC's home stadium.

== Visitor attractions ==
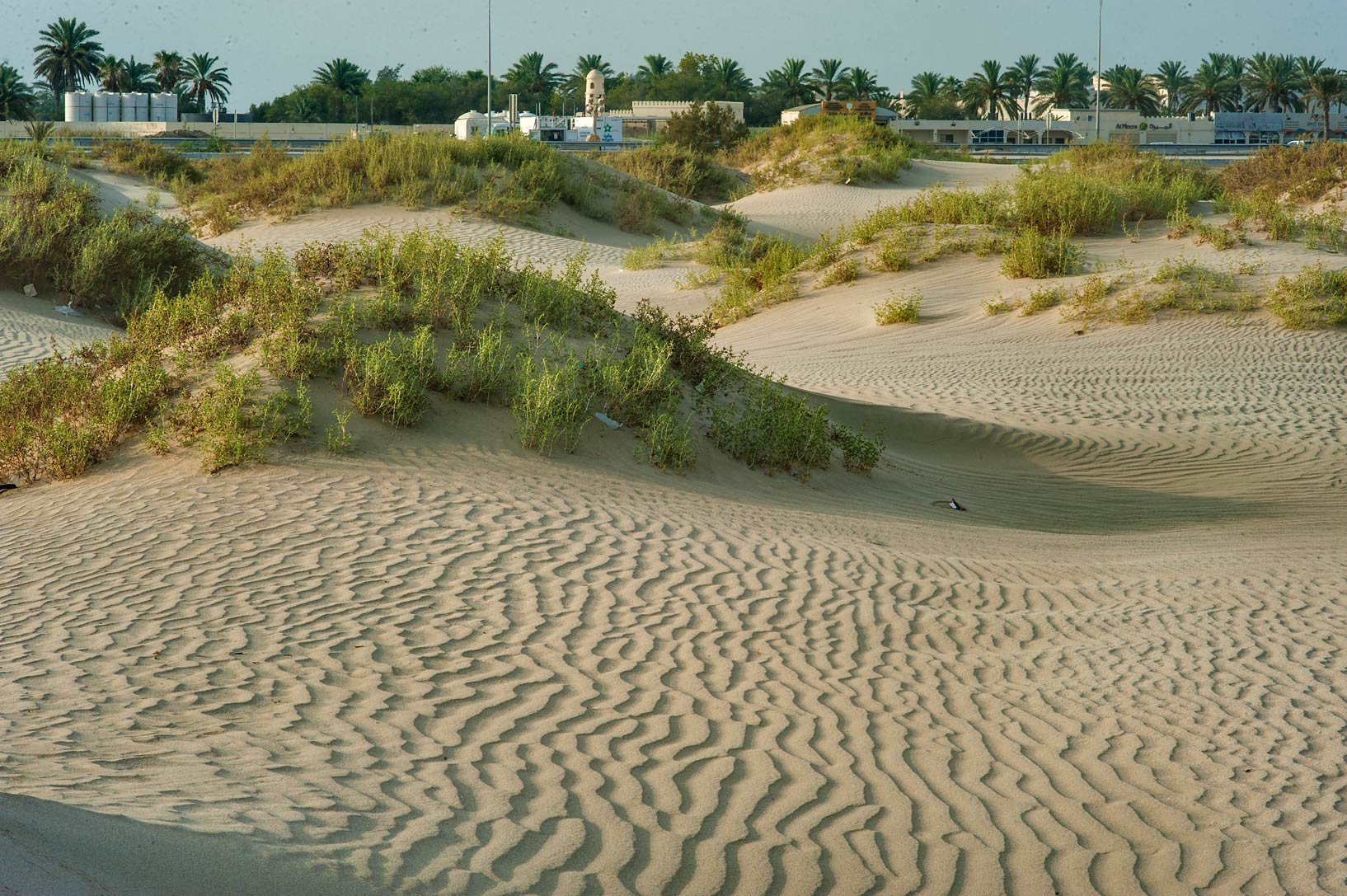
Sealine Beach Resort in Mesaieed.

Due to the unique ecosystem and landscape of Khor Al Adaid, it serves as one of the most important ecotourism site in the country.

Sealine Beach Resort, located on the coast in Mesaieed, was the first tourist resort to be established in the country. The resort has 37 rooms, 1 hectare of green space, a gym, a spa and 95 m^{2} (1,020 sq ft) multi-purpose hall.

According to the Ministry of Municipality and Environment, the municipality accommodates 6 parks as of 2018.

== Demographics ==
The following table is a breakdown of registered live births by nationality and sex for Al Wakrah. Places of birth are based on the home municipality of the mother at birth.

Registered live births by nationality and sex
Year	Qatari			Non-Qatari			Total		
Year	M	F	Total	M	F	Total	M	F	Total
1984	123	112	235	151	161	312	274	273	547
1985	101	105	206	183	181	364	284	286	570
1986	114	101	215	198	196	394	312	297	609
1987	131	97	228	215	179	394	346	276	622
1988	112	111	223	243	221	464	355	332	687
1989	123	114	237	236	231	467	359	345	704
1990	123	113	236	191	219	410	314	332	646
1991	122	109	231	165	167	332	287	276	563
1992	145	118	263	173	164	337	318	282	600
1993	132	142	274	192	167	359	324	309	633
1994	N/A								
1995	151	154	305	165	154	319	316	308	624
1996	140	172	312	154	178	332	294	350	644

Registered live births by nationality and sex
Year	Qatari			Non-Qatari			Total		
Year	M	F	Total	M	F	Total	M	F	Total
1997	150	157	307	125	128	253	275	285	560
1998	163	139	302	144	138	282	307	277	584
1999	174	142	316	156	111	267	330	253	583
2000	152	154	306	192	155	347	344	309	653
2001	168	156	324	170	176	346	338	332	670
2002	175	147	322	167	159	326	342	306	648
2003	183	159	342	172	190	362	355	349	704
2004	177	177	354	196	169	365	373	346	719
2005	176	179	355	202	181	383	378	360	738
2006	182	172	354	196	191	387	378	363	741
2007	209	161	370	238	206	444	447	367	814
2008	186	207	393	309	297	606	495	504	999
2009	216	248	464	369	333	702	585	581	1166
