= Birkat Al Awamer =

Birkat Al Awamer بركة العوامر
- District
- Location in Qatar
- Coordinates: 25.0762°N 51.4901°E
- Country: Qatar
- Municipality: Al Wakrah
- Zone: Zone 91
- District no.: 648

Area
  - Total: 4.9 sq mi (12.7 km^{2})

Birkat Al Awamer (Arabic: بركة العوامر, romanized: Birkat al ‘Awāmir) is a district in Qatar located in the municipality of Al Wakrah. Manateq Qatar established the Birkat Al Awamer Logistics Park in the district, which spans an area of 9,381,885 m^{2}.

Nearby settlements include Al Afja Mesaieed and Mesaieed to the east and Abu Sulba to the north, and Umm Al Houl to the northeast.

== Etymology ==
The first part of the district's name is derived from the Arabic term birka, which in Qatar is used to describe a depression that holds water. The second constituent, "Awamer", is the name of a local Arab tribe that settled the area.
