= Wadi Jallal =

Wadi Jallal وَادِي جَلاَّل
- Village
- Location in Qatar
- Coordinates: 25.026686°N 51.301125°E
- Country: Qatar
- Municipality: Al Wakrah
- Zone: Zone 95
- District no.: 674

Area
  - Total: 17.3 sq mi (44.9 km^{2})

Wadi Jallal (Arabic: وَادِي جَلاَّل, romanized: Wādī Jallāl) is a village located in the Al Wakrah municipality of Qatar. It is located approximately 37 kilometres (23 mi) from the capital Doha.

== Etymology ==
As the area is typified by a wadi (dry river-valley) which would flood during heavy rains, it was named Wadi Jallal; the second constituent being derived from the Arabic jalaa, meaning "to wash away".

== Geography ==
Wadi Jallal is situated in south-central Qatar. The village of Al Kharrara is nearby. It forms part of the southern desert region, which occupies 34.7% of Qatar's total area. Of the four sub-regions of the southern desert, Wadi Jallal is a part of the southern zone of the Miocene-Tiwar sub-area.

The area around Wadi Jallal is part of a region characterized by Miocene-era formations that are distinct from the surrounding older rock types. In terms of terrain, Wadi Jallal is part of a region characterized by a mix of rocky plains (hamada), hills and sand dunes. As a wadi (valley), it represents a depression in the landscape.
