= Traina (Qatar) =

Traina Mazra‘at Turaynā ترينة
- Village
- Location in Qatar
- Coordinates: 24°45′32″N 51°12′43″E
- Country: Qatar
- Municipality: Al Wakrah
- Zone: Zone 95
- District no.: 693

Area
  - Total: 11.6 sq mi (30.1 km^{2})

Traina (Arabic: ترينة; also known as Mazra`at Turayna) is a village in southern Qatar located in the municipality of Al Wakrah.

Traina is private property owned by Sheikh Ghanim bin Abdulrahman bin Jassim Al Thani's family.

Nearby settlements include Al Aamriya in Al Rayyan Municipality to the west, Khor Al Adaid to the south-east and Al Kharrara to the north.

== Etymology ==
Traina was named after the citron which grows in the desert. In Arabic, it is called turunj (Arabic: الترنج) which Traina is known for and which it got its name from.

== Gallery ==
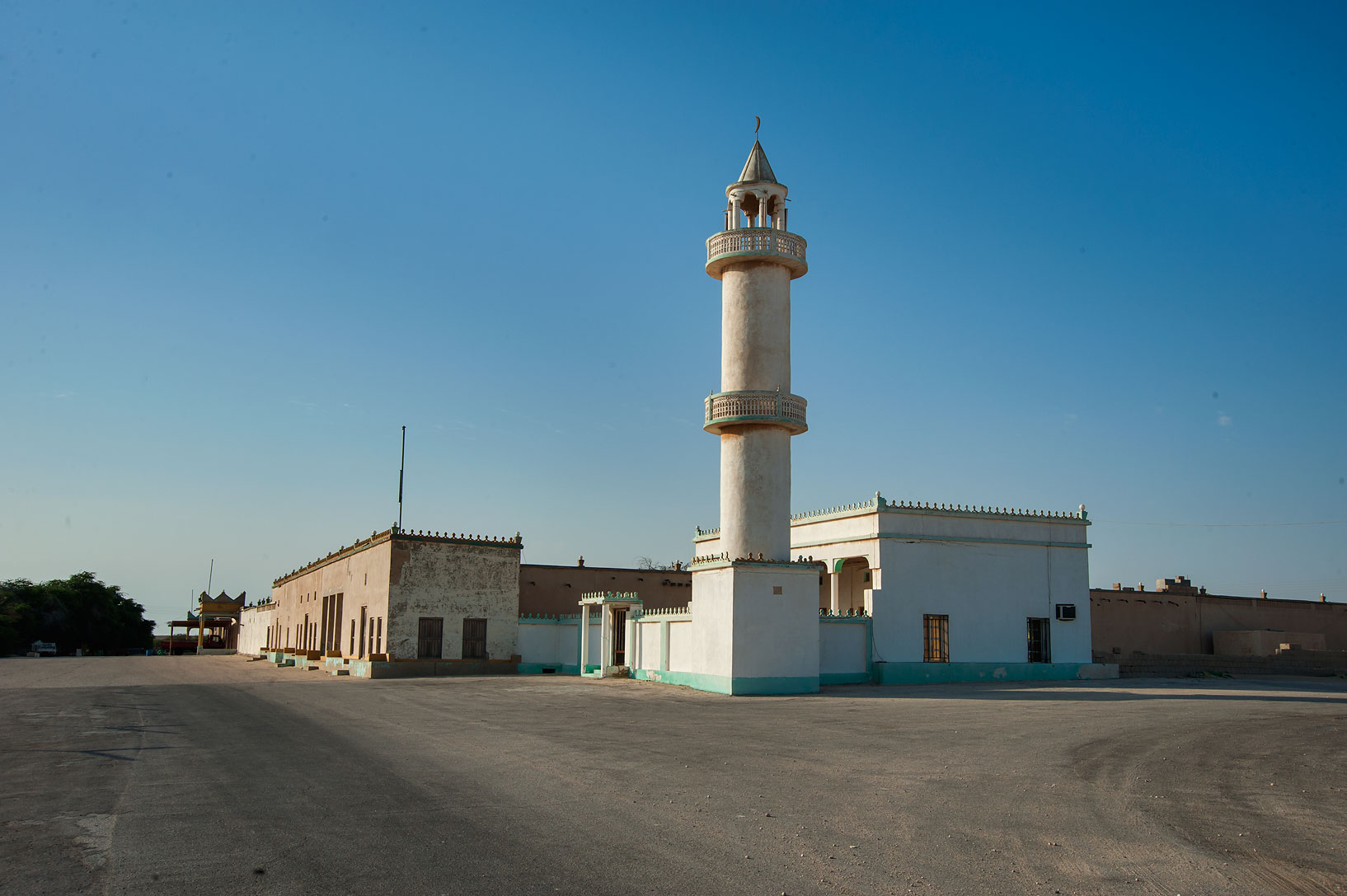
Mosque at the entrance of Traina.

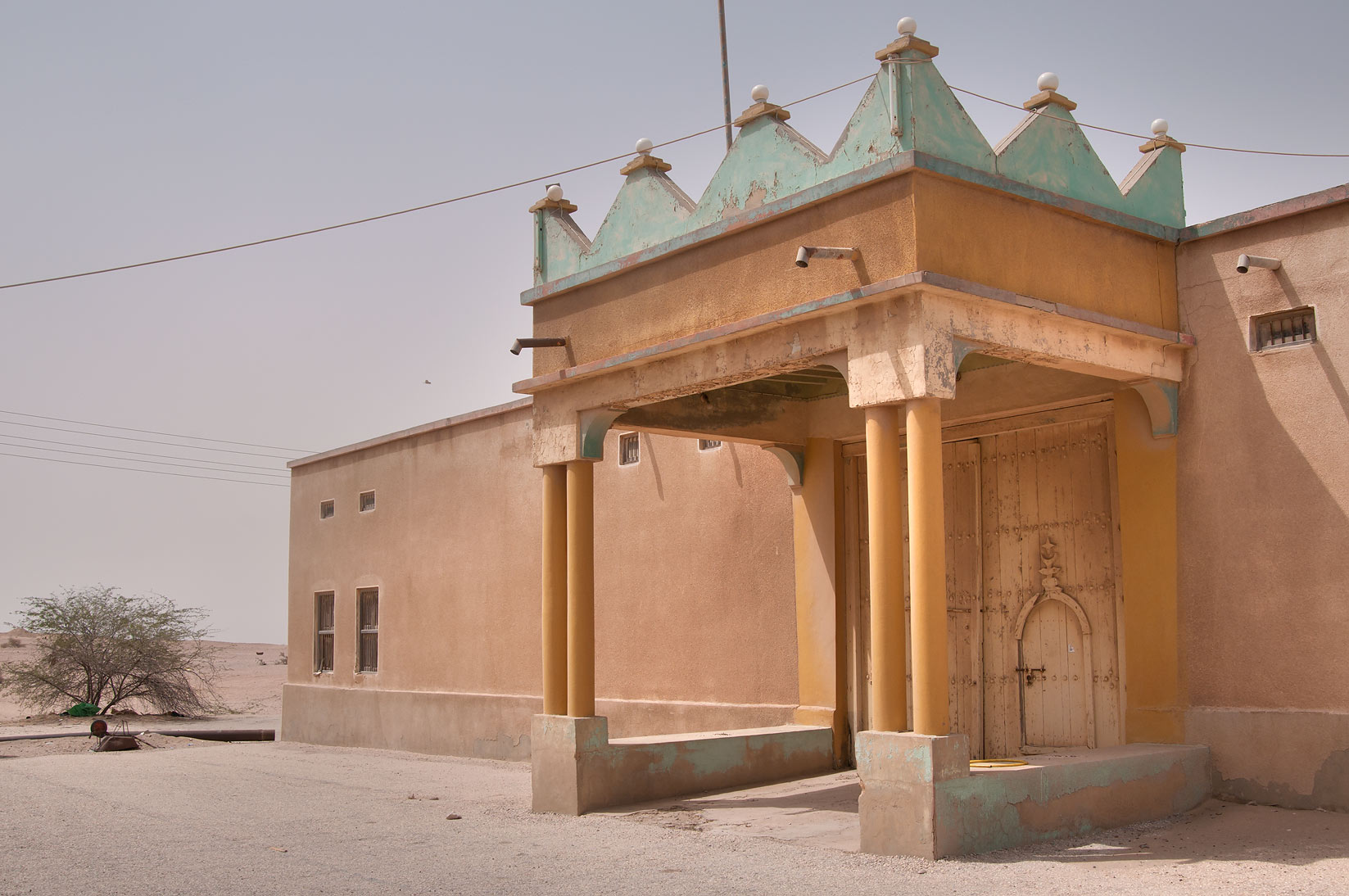
A gated building in Traina.

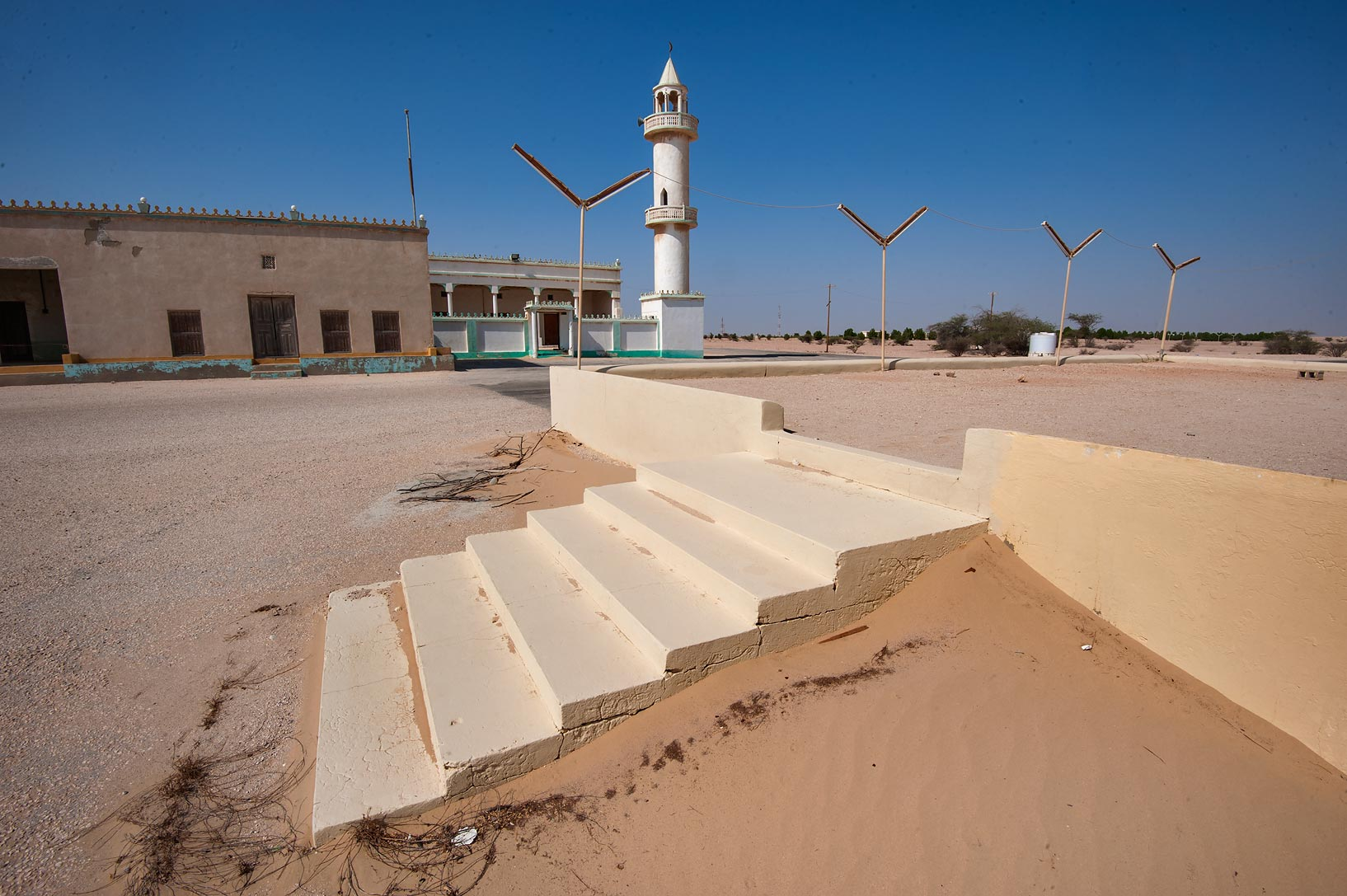
Central square of Traina.
