= Zone 95, Qatar =

Zone 95
- Zone
- Interactive map of Zone 95
- Coordinates: 24.907719°N 51.240765°E
- Country: Qatar
- Municipality: Al Wakrah
- Blocks: 31

Area
  - Total: 902.36 km^{2} (348.40 sq mi)

Population (2015)
  - Total: 3,478
  - Density: 3.854/km^{2} (9.983/sq mi)
- Time zone: UTC+03 (Arabia Standard Time)
- ISO 3166 code: QA-WA

Zone 95 is a zone of the municipality of Al Wakrah in the state of Qatar. The main district recorded in the 2015 population census was Al Kharrara.

Other districts which fall within its administrative boundaries are Traina and Wadi Jallal.

== Demographics ==
As of the 2010 census, the zone comprised 45 housing units. There were 117 people living in the zone, of which 100% were male and 0% were female. Out of the 117 inhabitants, 98% were 20 years of age or older and 2% were under the age of 20. The literacy rate stood at 70.1%. Employed persons made up 100% of the total population.

Year	Population
1986	185
1997	134
2004	48
2010	126
2015	3,478

== Land use ==
The Ministry of Municipality and Environment (MME) breaks down land use in the zone as follows.

Area (km^{2})	Developed land (km^{2})	Undeveloped land (km^{2})	Residential (km^{2})	Commercial/ Industrial (km^{2})	Education/ Health (km^{2})	Farming/ Green areas (km^{2})	Other uses (km^{2})
902.36	99.63	802.73	0.30	0.00	0.00	30.05	69.28
