= Al Wukair =

Al Wukair اَلْوُكَيْر
- Town
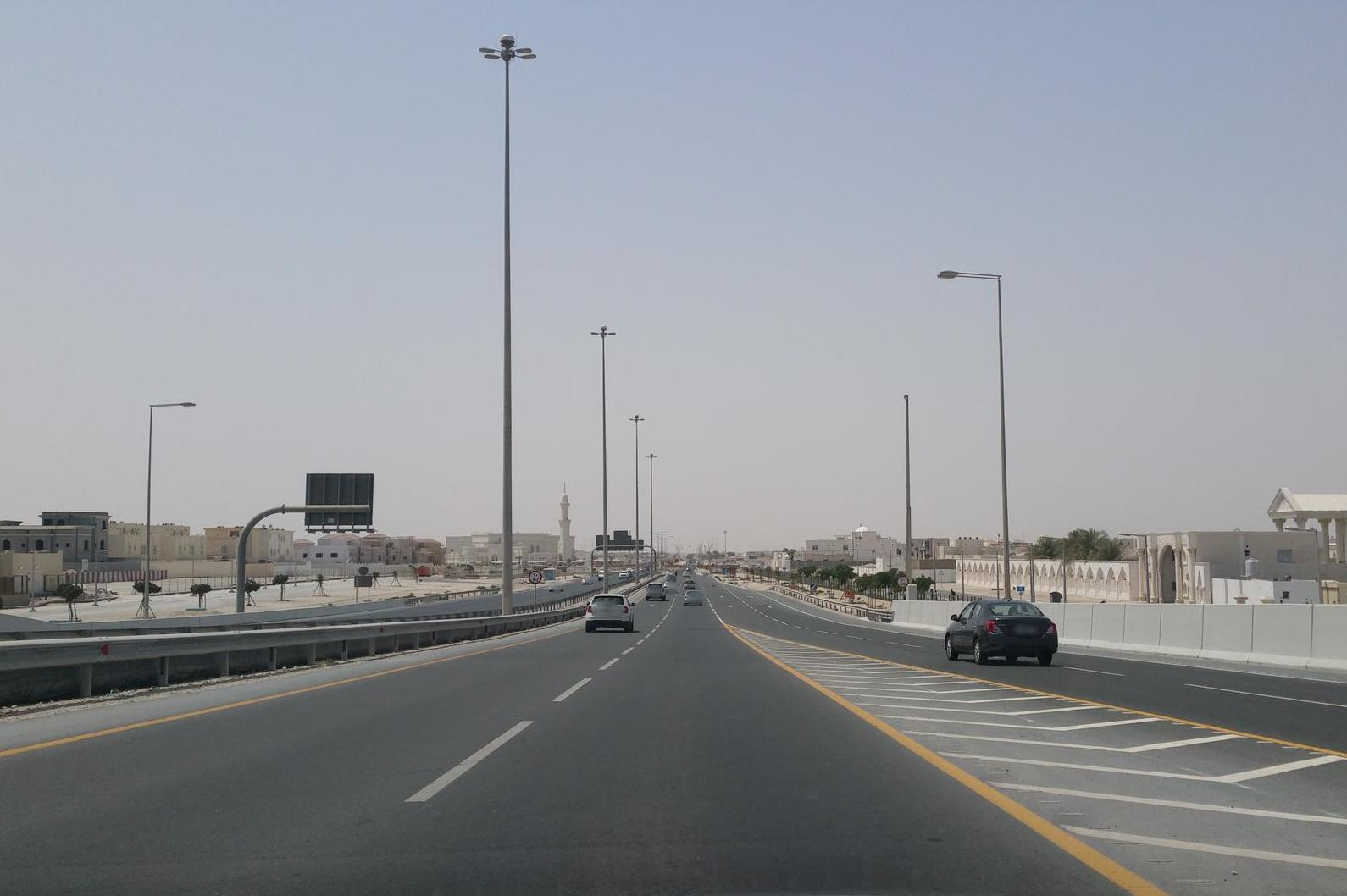
- Entrance to Al Wukair on Al Wukair Road.

- Location within Qatar
- Coordinates: 25°09′03″N 51°32′16″E
- Country: Qatar
- Municipality: Al Wakrah Municipality
- Zone: Zone 91
- District no.: 639

Area
  - Total: 29.4 km^{2} (11.4 sq mi)
- Elevation: 9 m (30 ft)

Population (2004)
  - Total: 4,400
  - Density: 150/km^{2} (390/sq mi)

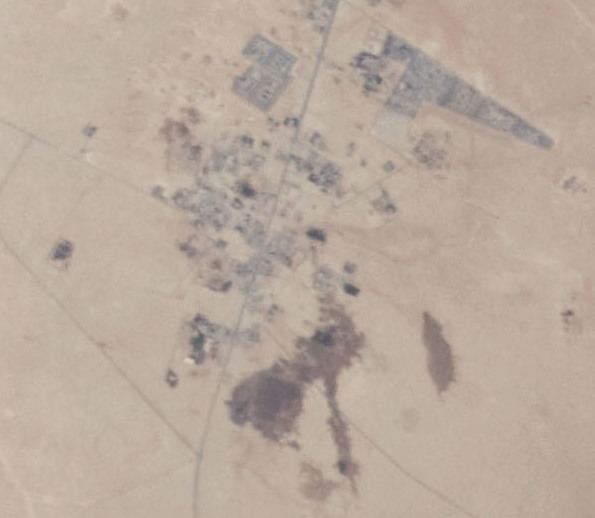
Satellite imagery of Al Wukair in 2009. Al Wukair Road can be seen running the town center.

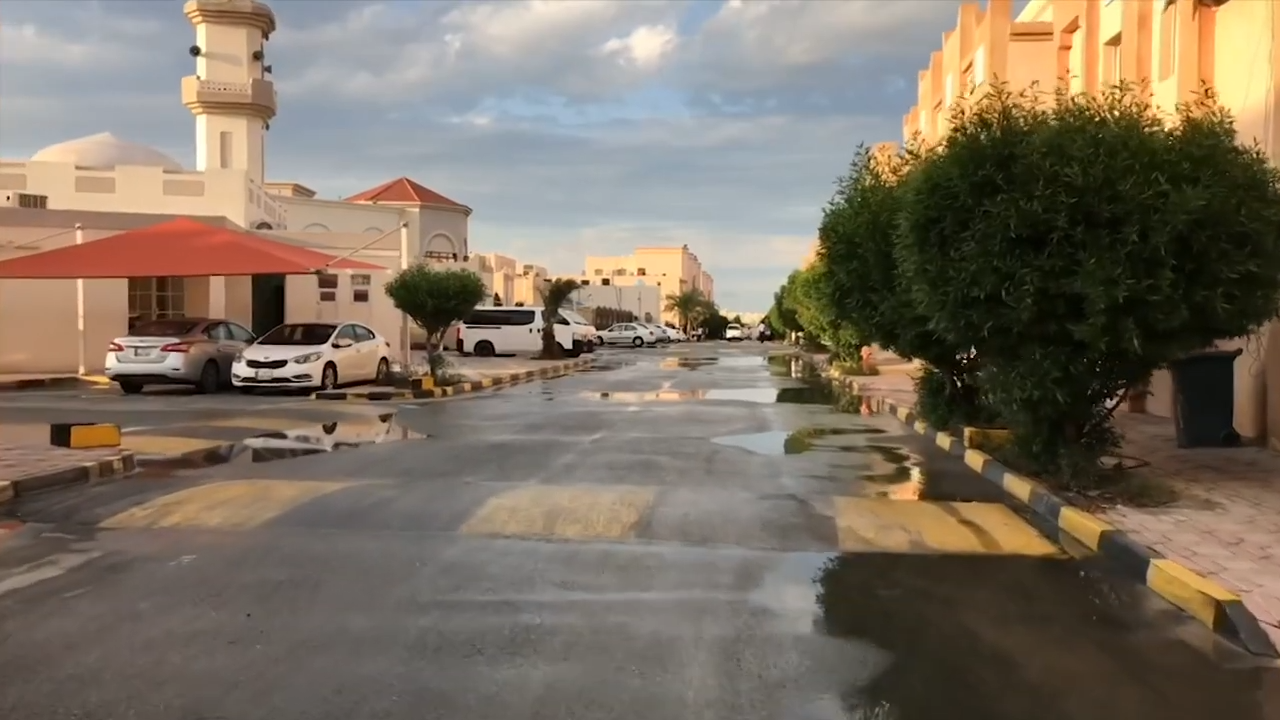
View of Ezdan Village 32 in Al Wukair.

Al Wukair (Arabic: اَلْوُكَيْر) is a town in Qatar, located in Al Wakrah Municipality. It is 19 minutes away from Doha and is located near the city of Al Wakrah. It was previously a prominent fishing and pearling village. It was demarcated in 1988. The gated compounds of Ezdan Village house a substantial part of the town's population.

== Etymology ==
Similar to neighboring Al Wakrah, the town's name originates from the Arabic term wakar, meaning "bird nest". This name was acquired from the abundant birds' nests in the area.

== Geography ==
Qatar's capital, Doha, is located at a distance of 23 km to the north. Other distances include Al Wakrah – 8 km to the east, Umm Salal Ali – 50 km to the north, Madinat ash Shamal – 130 km away, Al Khor – 80 km away, Mesaieed – 18 km away, and Dukhan – 66.5 km away.

== Developments ==
In 2015, construction began on a housing village for laborers located on a 150,000 sq meter plot of land in Al Wukair.

The Public Works Authority (Ashghal) embarked on a QR 1.5 billion infrastructure project in Al Wukair South in April 2018, with an estimated completion date of 2020. Among the infrastructural improvements will be an additional 166 km of sewage networks, 310 km of water networks, 172 km of roads and a total of 27 intersections. Buildings to be constructed over a 15.5 square km area include 3,508 housing plots, 16 schools, 32 mosques, 1 hospital and several government and commercial plots.

== Industry ==
Al Wukair Logistics Park was built here on an area of 1.48 km^{2}. The location was selected due to Al Wukair's close proximity to the major highway system of Al Majd Road and Qatar's main seaport, Hamad Port. Warehouses in the park will be maintained by GWC (Gulf Warehousing Company QPSC) and will have a variety of specialized storage facilities. Other industrial facilities in the park will include warehouse yards and light industrial workshops. Furthermore, the park will host a mosque, laborers' residences and stores.

== Transport ==
The community is served by two metrolinks, a feeder bus network, from Al Wakrah Metro Station:

- M130, which serves Ezdan Village 4–7.
- M131, which serves Ezdan Village 3 and 8–11.

== Demographics ==
Year	Population
1986	4,141
1997	3,948
2004	4,400
