= Shagra, Qatar =

Shagra شقراء
- Settlement
- Location within Qatar
- Coordinates: 24°49′00″N 51°22′00″E
- Country: Qatar
- Municipality: Al Wakrah Municipality
- Zone: Zone 94
- District no.: 666

Area
  - Total: 77.3 km^{2} (29.8 sq mi)
- Elevation: 16 m (52 ft)

Population (2015)
  - Total: 4,714
  - Density: 61.0/km^{2} (158/sq mi)

Shagra (Arabic: شقراء [ALA-LC: Shaqrāʼ]; also known as Ash Shagra and Shaqra) is a Qatari settlement located in the municipality of Al Wakrah. It was previously located in Mesaieed Municipality before the municipality was incorporated in Al Wakrah Municipality.

It is in Zone 94, which is a highly undeveloped area, consisting mainly of open desert. Of its 497.2 square km area, only 46 square km of land is under use. Residential units occupy 2% of its land, commercial and industrial establishments occupy 10%, and "other" (including under-construction) areas account for the remaining 88% of developed land.

== Etymology ==
Shagra's name has its roots in the Arabic word shaqra, meaning "blonde" or "fair". According to the Ministry of Municipality and Environment (MME), the name was originally given to a well posthumously for a light-colored camel owned by nomads in the area, and eventually came to be applied to the entire region. However, in the Encyclopedia of Qatari Information, it is stated that the name is derived from a lightish colored hillock.

Various alternative transliterations of the name are used by the MME, including Shaqra, Eshaiqir, and Leshaiger.

== Geography ==
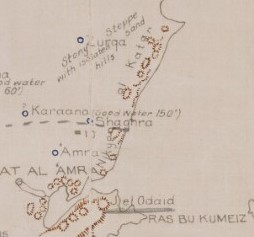
Shagra depicted in a 1935 map to the west of the dune-laden coast

The most convenient point of entry into Shagra is from the road leading from Mesaieed to the east. Another route, accessible from the north and west, is from the village of Al Khubayb.

== Archaeology ==
An important Neolithic period site is located in Shagra. The site was first discovered by a French archaeological team in 1981, and in 1988 it was described in a publication authored by a member of the team, Dr. Marie-Louise Inizan. It is one of the earliest settlements found in the southern portion of Qatar and dates back to 6000 BC. Among the artifacts found at the site was a two-room structure, flints and remnants of fish and molluscs.

Although there were numerous references to the site in Inizan's reports, no co-ordinates were mentioned and the site was subsequently lost due to strong winds burying the area under sand. Between 2010 and 2012, Qatar Museums Authority attempted to narrow the location of the site but were unsuccessful. Finally, in 2015, geologist Jacques LeBlanc was successful in rediscovering the site.

In addition to rediscovering the lost site, LeBlanc also discovered a new site approximately 0.65 kilometres (0.40 mi) northwest of the old site which he dubbed Shagra II. At the site, he recorded an 18 meter path along which foundations were visible of four to five adjacent dwellings, a lone dwelling roughly 19 meters south of the aforementioned path, another partially submerged dwelling approximately 13 meters northeast of the path, and a north-to-south facing grave 5 meters to the west from the path. The grave is located in a sabkha, has rock slabs on either side, and may have belonged to a child.

== Demographics ==
As of the 2010 census, the settlement comprised 11 housing units and 6 establishments. There were 3,874 people living in the settlement, of which 99% were male and 1% were female. Out of the 3,874 inhabitants, 99% were 20 years of age or older and 1% was under the age of 20. The literacy rate stood at 97.6%.

Employed persons made up 100% of the total population. Females accounted for 0% of the working population, while males accounted for 100% of the working population.

Year	Population
1986	33
1997	33
2004	54
2010	3,874
2015	4,714
