= Zone 92, Qatar =

Zone 92
- Zone
- Interactive map of Zone 92
- Coordinates: 25.024989°N 51.573371°E
- Country: Qatar
- Municipality: Al Wakrah
- Blocks: 124

Area
  - Total: 133.23 km^{2} (51.44 sq mi)

Population (2015)
  - Total: 37,548
  - Density: 281.83/km^{2} (729.93/sq mi)
- Time zone: UTC+03 (Arabia Standard Time)
- ISO 3166 code: QA-WA

Zone 92 is a zone of the municipality of Al Wakrah in the state of Qatar. The main district recorded in the 2015 population census was Mesaieed.

Another district which falls within its administrative boundaries is Al Afja Mesaieed.

== Demographics ==
As of the 2010 census, the zone comprised 3,318 housing units and 452 establishments. There were 35,150 people living in the zone, of which 97% were male and 3% were female. Out of the 35,150 inhabitants, 91% were 20 years of age or older and 9% were under the age of 20. The literacy rate stood at 99.8%. Employed persons made up 86% of the total population. Females accounted for 1% of the working population, while males accounted for 99% of the working population.

Year	Population
1986	6,094
1997	7,424
2004	12,611
2010	35,150
2015	37,548

== Land use ==
The Ministry of Municipality and Environment (MME) breaks down land use in the zone as follows.

Area (km^{2})	Developed land (km^{2})	Undeveloped land (km^{2})	Residential (km^{2})	Commercial/ Industrial (km^{2})	Education/ Health (km^{2})	Farming/ Green areas (km^{2})	Other uses (km^{2})
133.23	68.84	64.38	1.71	3.59	0.15	2.39	61
