= Țarina mine =

Gold mine in Romania

Țarina
- Location in Romania
- Location: Bucium, Alba County, Romania; 46°11′N 23°05′E

The Țarina mine is a large mine located in the west of Romania in Alba County. Țarina represents a large gold deposit with estimated reserves of 1.52 million oz of gold and 5.59 million oz of silver.
