= Barwa Al Baraha =

Barwa Al Baraha بروة البراحة
- Planned city
- Location within Qatar
- Coordinates: 25.163154°N 51.486118°E
- Country: Qatar
- Municipality: Al Wakrah Municipality

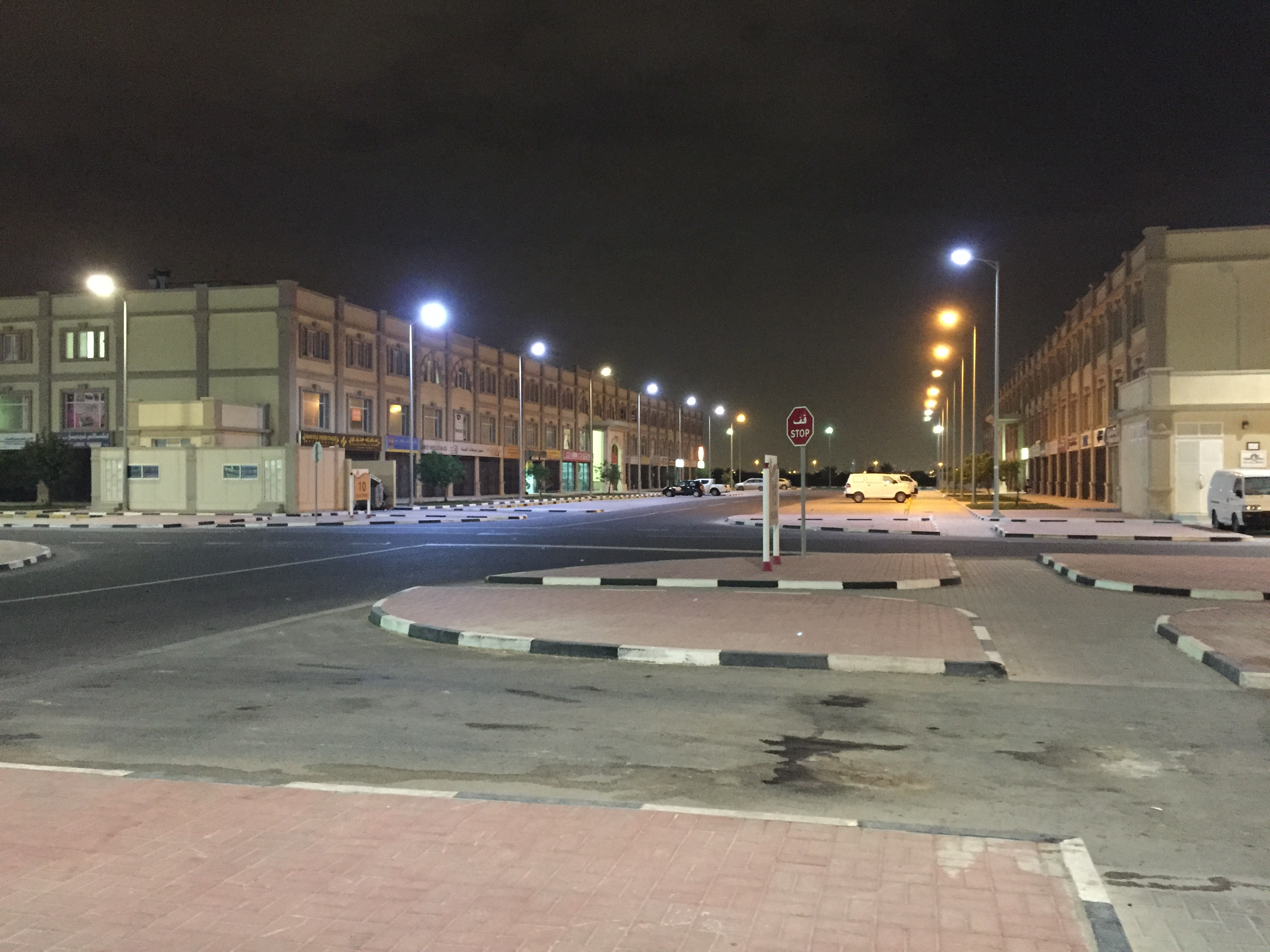
Barwa Al Baraha at night.

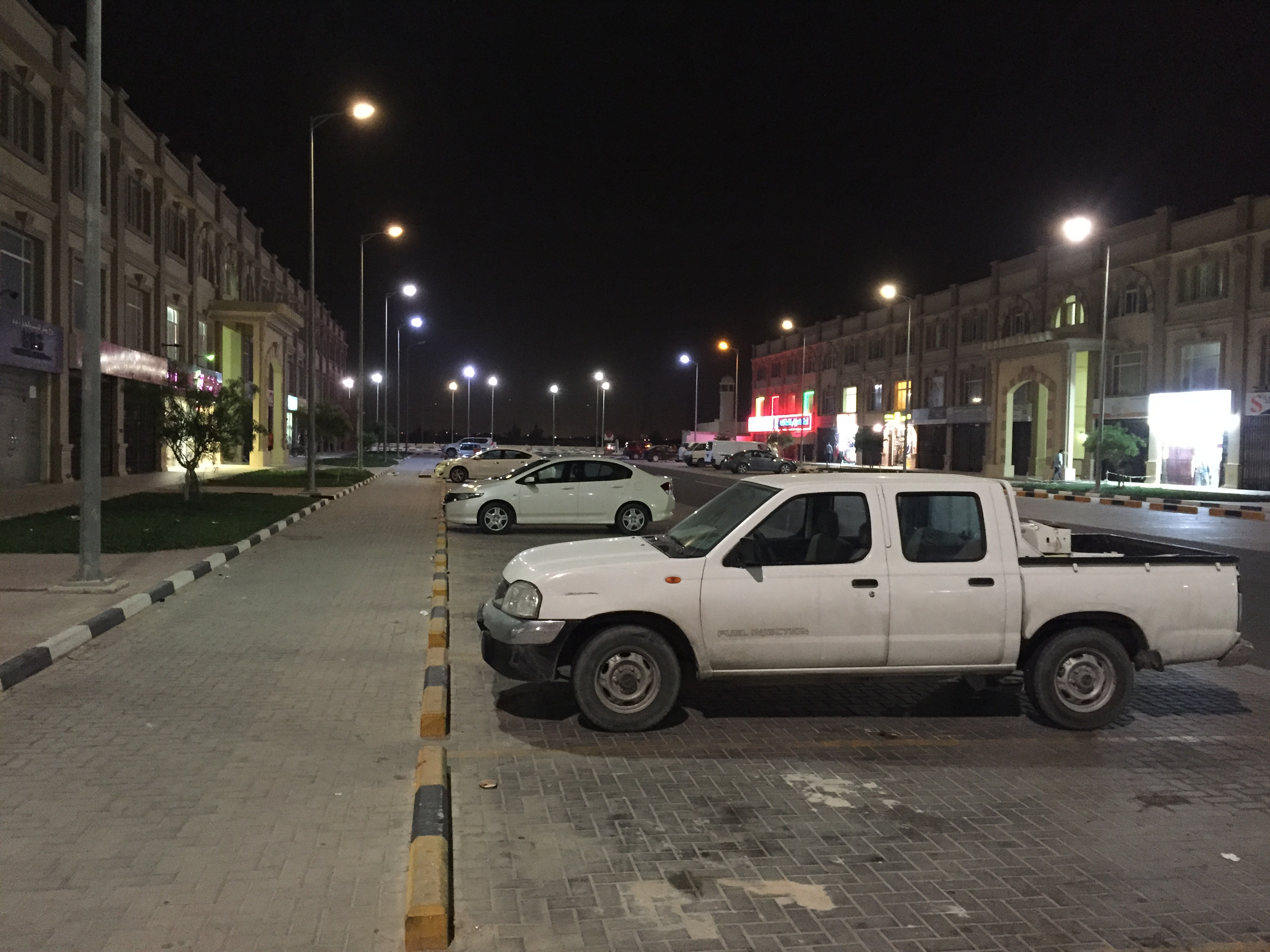
Barwa Al Baraha at night.

Barwa Al Baraha (Arabic: بروة البراحة; popularly known as Barwa Village) is a residential and commercial area mostly for expatriates in the Doha Industrial Area located south of the Industrial Area in Al Wakrah Municipality in Qatar. The project aims to provide a reasonable standard of living as defined by the new Human Rights Legislation.

== Project ==
The Barwa Al Baraha is built by Qatari contracting agency Barwa Group. Its budget was around $1.1 billion and the construction took place in Al Wakrah. Phase one of the project (truck park) was set to be completed at the end of 2008, whereas the project itself had an initial deadline of mid-2010. The deadline was met and the project was announced to be completed in 2010.

== Facilities ==
=== Phase 1: Truck park ===
The truck park has a holding capacity of 4,200 trucks. The Barwa Al Baraha truck park is the largest in the world, with advanced security equipment.

=== Phase 2: Residential area ===
Along with 4.25 square meters of living space per person, the residential project provides parks, recreational areas, malls, and shops for labourers. It was planned to host up to 50,000 labourers on 1.8 square kilometres. This phase entailed the construction of 64 4-floor buildings, each having around 130 rooms able to host up to 6 labourers.
