= Al Thumama (Doha) =

Al-Thumama الثمامة
- District
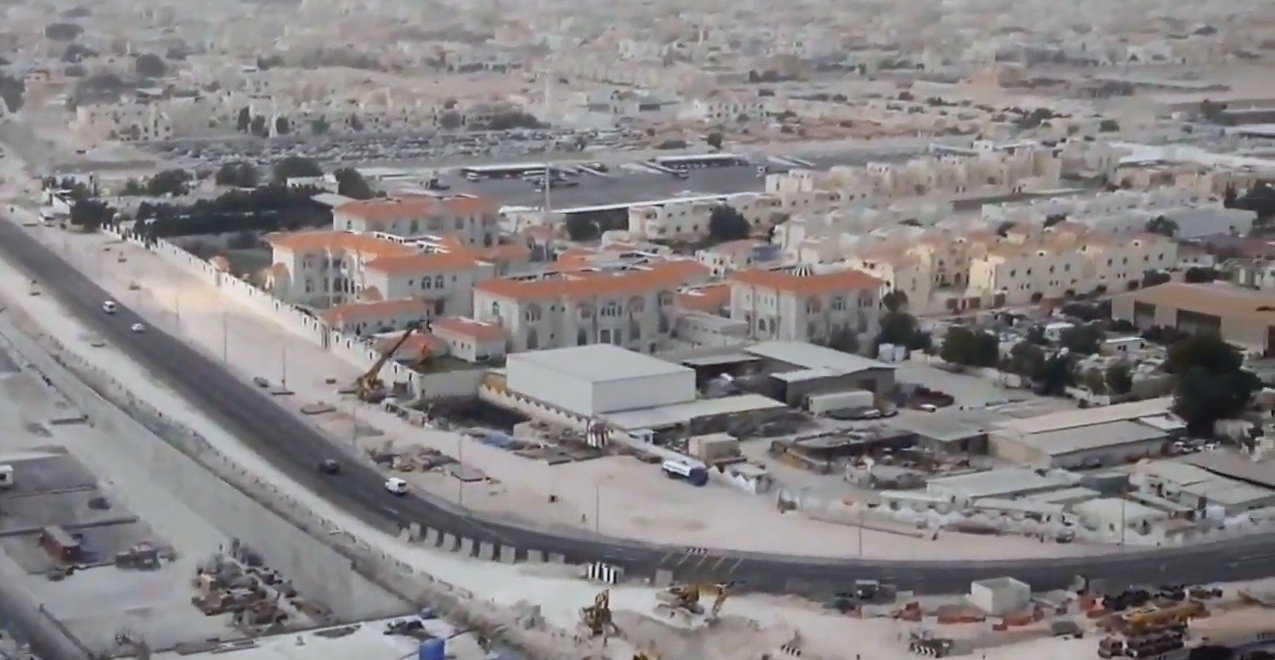
- Aerial view of Zone 47 of Al Thumama, with Airport Street in the foreground, in 2014.

- Location within Doha Location within Qatar
- Coordinates: 25°13′47″N 51°32′45″E
- Country: Qatar
- Municipality: Doha / Al Wakrah
- Zone: Zone 46, Zone 47
- District no.: 45

Area
  - Total: 7.0 km^{2} (2.7 sq mi)
- Elevation: 12 m (39 ft)

Population (2010)
  - Total: 16,596
  - Density: 2,400/km^{2} (6,100/sq mi)

Al-Thumama (Arabic: الثمامة, romanized: ath-Thumāma) is a district in Doha in Qatar. It comprises one of five mega reservoirs for Qatar, designed to improve water security. Completed in 2020, the reservoirs are among the largest in the world in their category. The district's Al Thumama Stadium served as one of the venues for the Qatar 2022 World Cup.

As one of Doha's newer districts, the area is well-planned and was laid out according to a strict grid pattern. City authorities first planned the district in the 1990s, and since then it has grown at a fast rate. It is primarily a residential district, with Qataris and Arab expatriates being the most common groups to reside here. Doha's road system is well-connected to the area, with important roads such as the E Ring Road, F Ring Road and Al Matar Street running through it. Furthermore, it is close to Hamad International Airport.

== Etymology ==
The district derives its name from a plant that grows abundantly in the area. Known locally as thumam (Latin name Panicum turgidum), it is a sod-forming perennial grass adapted to desert climates.

== Transport ==
Mowasalat is the official transport company of Qatar and serves the community through its operation of public bus routes. Al Thumama serves as the terminus of two bus lines, both of which depart from Al Ghanim Bus Station. Route 10 has stops at Najma and Al Mansoura and a terminus at Al Thumama at Bus Stop 5, running at a frequency of every 30 minutes on all days of the week. The other route, route 11, has stops at Al Najma, Lulu Hyper Market, and Old Airport and a terminus at Al Thumama near the Supreme Education Council, running at frequency of every 20 minutes on all days of the week.

Major roads that run through the district are E Ring Road, Airport Street and Al Fadail Street.

== Sports ==
Al Thumama Stadium, a 2022 FIFA World Cup venue, is planned to be built in the district. Designed by Qatari architect Ibrahim Jaidah, it will have a seating capacity of 40,000 spectators and will be designed to mimic a traditional Arabic cap known as a gahfiya.

== Demographics ==
As of the 2010 census, the district comprised 3,451 housing units and 124 establishments. There were 16,596 people living in the district, of which 63% were male and 37% were female. Out of the 16,596 inhabitants, 75% were 20 years of age or older and 25% were under the age of 20.

Employed persons made up 63% of the total population. Females accounted for 24% of the working population, while males accounted for 76% of the working population.

== Gallery ==
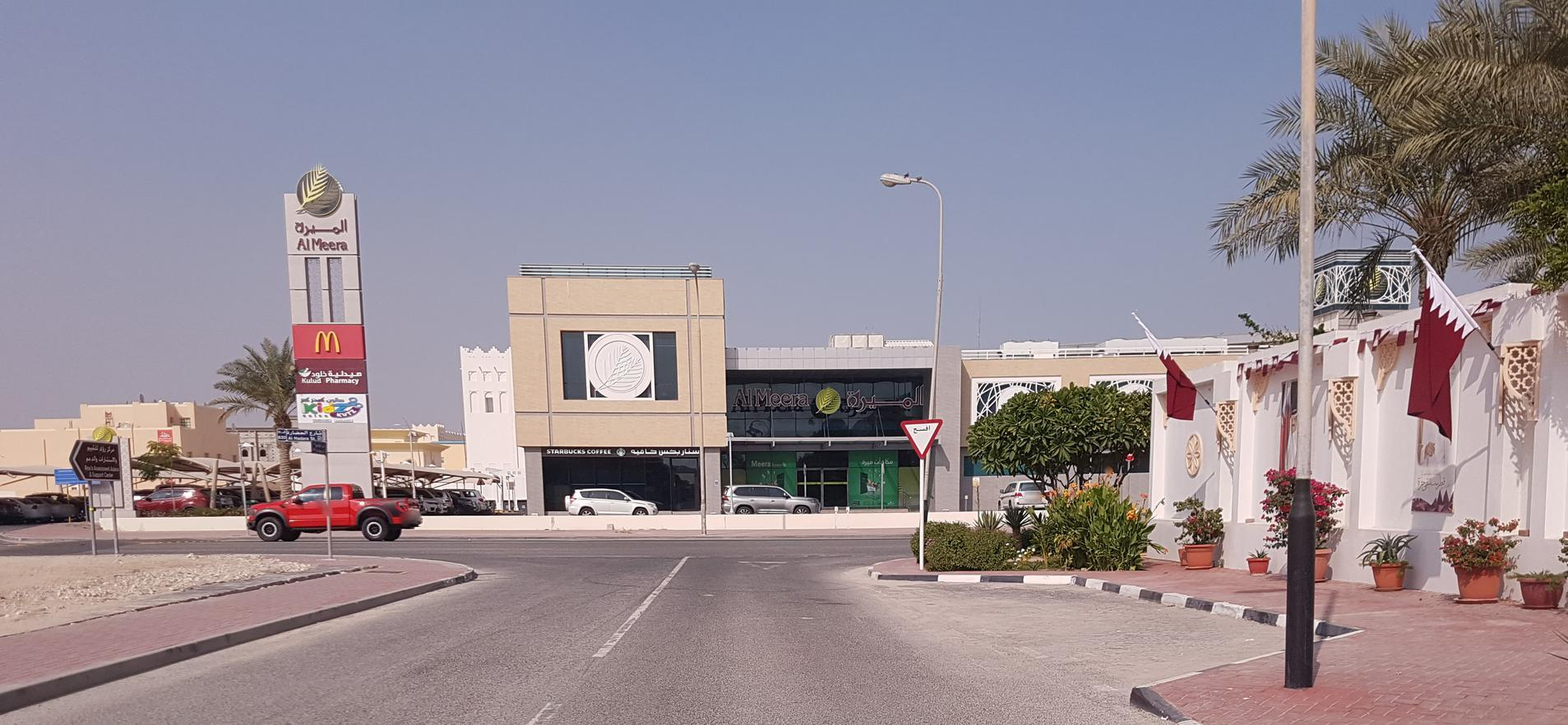
Al Meera Supercenter on Al Hadra Street in Al Thumama.

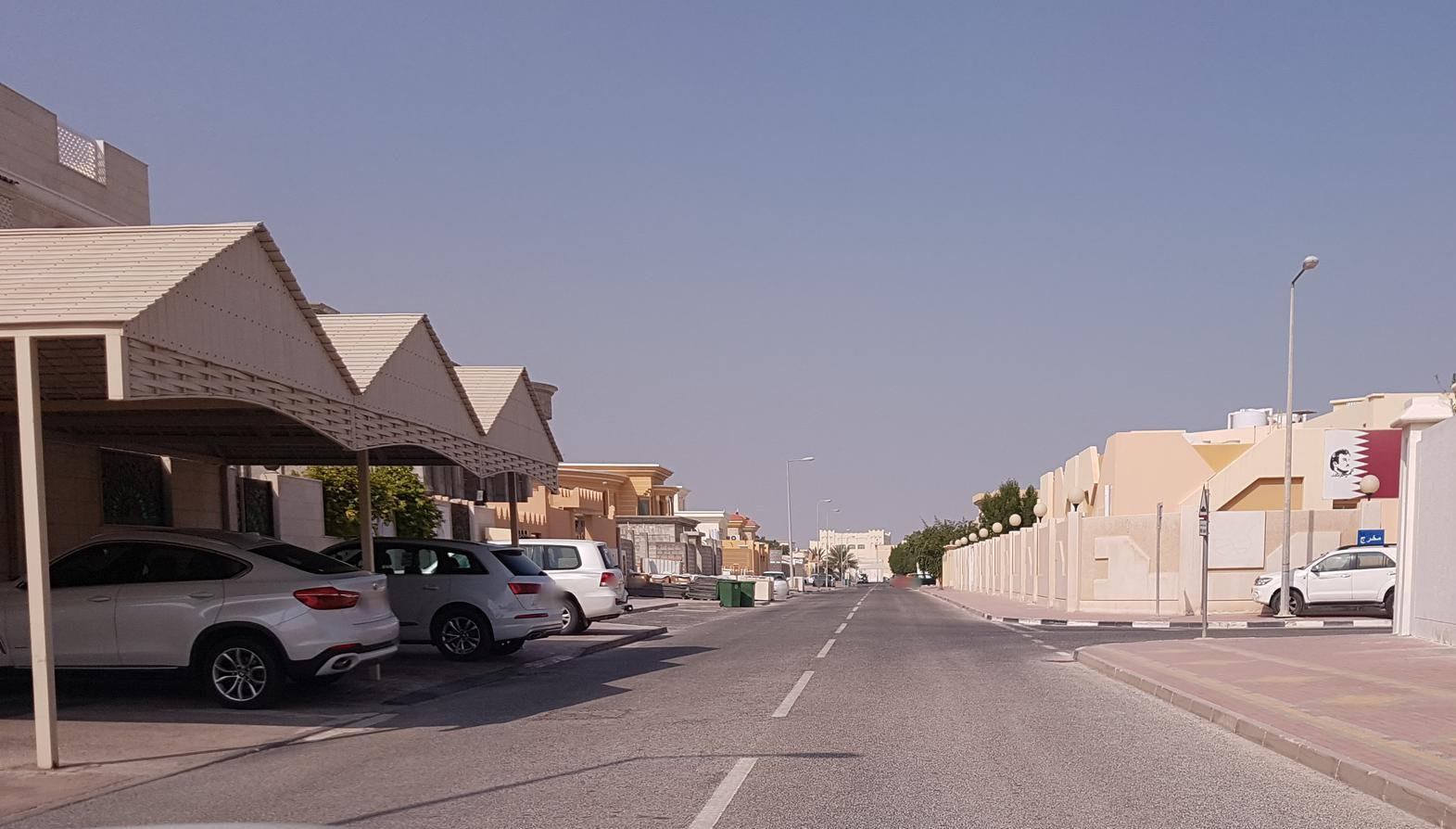
Ibn Al Baitar Street in Al Thumama.
