= Umm Al Houl =

Umm Al Houl أم الحول
- District
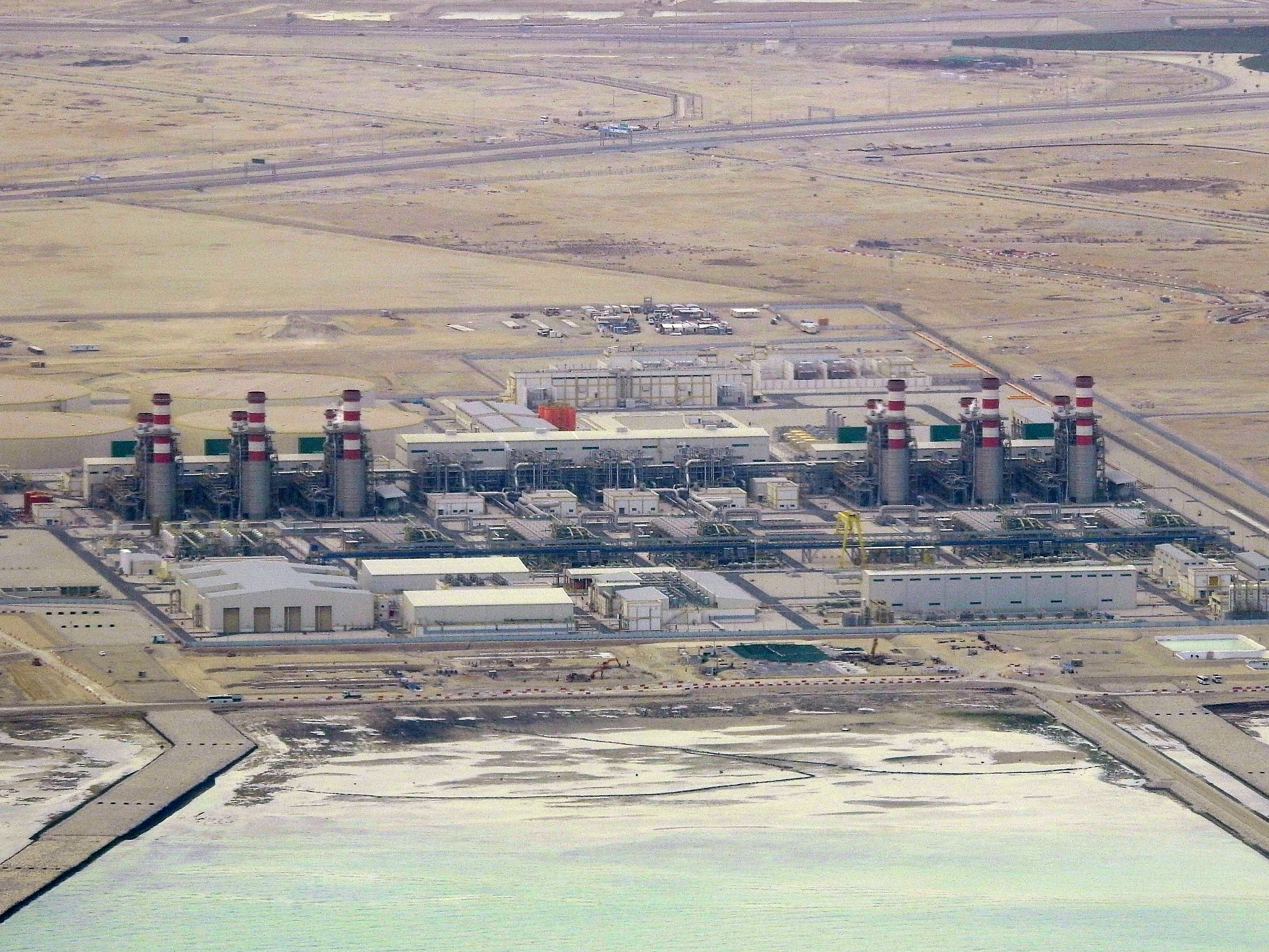
- Umm Al Houl IWPP

- Location in Qatar
- Coordinates: 25°04′54″N 51°36′51″E
- Country: Qatar
- Municipality: Al Wakrah

Area
  - Total: 13 sq mi (34 km^{2})

Umm Al Houl (Arabic: أم الحول, romanized: Umm al Ḩūl) is an industrial district in Qatar located in the municipality of Al Wakrah. To the north of Umm Al Houl is the city of Al Wakrah while Mesaieed is to the south.

The government has designated the district as a free economic zone starting in early 2019. Qatar's largest seaport, Hamad Port, is located here.

== Etymology ==
The first constituent, umm, is the Arabic word for "mother" and is a common prefix used to denote geographical features. Houl is an Arabic term reserved for a type of snare. Historically, birds of considerable size were commonly caught here using traps, lending the area its name.

== History ==
In 1895 the Sheikh of Abu Dhabi attempted to claim it as his western frontier but his claim was rejected by his superiors in the British government.

J.G. Lorimer's Gazetteer of the Persian Gulf gives an account of Umm Al Houl in 1908, referring to it as "Dohat [bay] Umm al-Hūl" and giving its location as 5 miles south of Al Wakrah. He goes on to state:

There was formerly a small settlement of the Sudan [Suwaidi] tribe here, but it has been abandoned in consequence of the badness of the water supply. Remains are visible of a village and fort.

== Geography ==
Strategically located in Qatar's southeastern region to the immediate north of the Mesaieed Industrial Area and approximately 20 kilometres (12 mi) south of Hamad International Airport, the area was chosen as a maritime hub for its suitable geography and close proximity to Qatar's industrial and economic centers.

Umm Al Houl constitutes a part of the Mesaieed Sabkha, the largest sabkha formation in the country. This area is characterized by a unique microbial mat system consisting of two to three separate mats, each covering approximately 60 m^{2} (650 sq ft). These mats are permanently isolated from direct seawater contact by substantial sand dunes.

The hydrology of Umm Al Houl demonstrates significant seasonal variations. During winter, the mats are consistently submerged under seawater with a salinity of about 5%, primarily sourced from seepage from the adjacent Persian Gulf, with minimal contribution from rainfall (annual precipitation rarely exceeds 100 millimetres (3.9 in)). The water depth averages around 30 centimetres (12 in), with temperatures ranging from 15°C to 26°C in December. Summer conditions see the mats remain inundated, albeit with shallower water depths and significantly increased salinity, often exceeding 13% due to high evaporation rates. Water temperatures can surpass 33°C, coinciding with air temperatures that can exceed 47°C.

== Umm Al Houl Power Plant ==
After being launched in 2015, the Umm Al Houl Power Plant was commissioned in March 2018. The plant has the capacity to desalinate 136.5 million gallons of water daily, meeting approximately 40% of Qatar's requirement, as well as a generation capacity of 2,520 MW.

== Transport ==
Currently, the elevated Umm Al Houl Metro Station is under construction, having been launched during Phase 2A. Once completed, it will be part of Doha Metro's Red Line South.

== Gallery ==
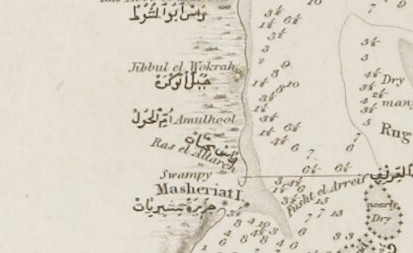
Umm Al Houl depicted as Amulhool in an 1829 map.

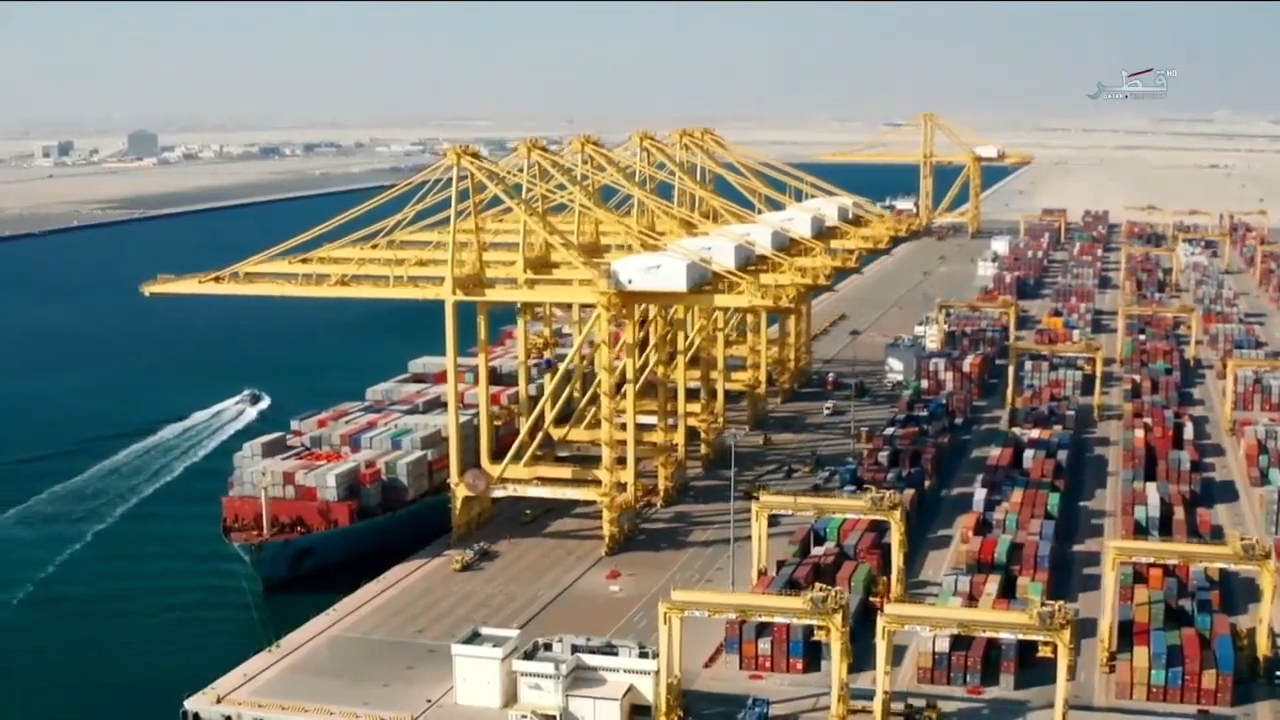
Overhead view of Hamad Port.
