= Al Kharrara =

Al Kharrara الخرارة
- Village
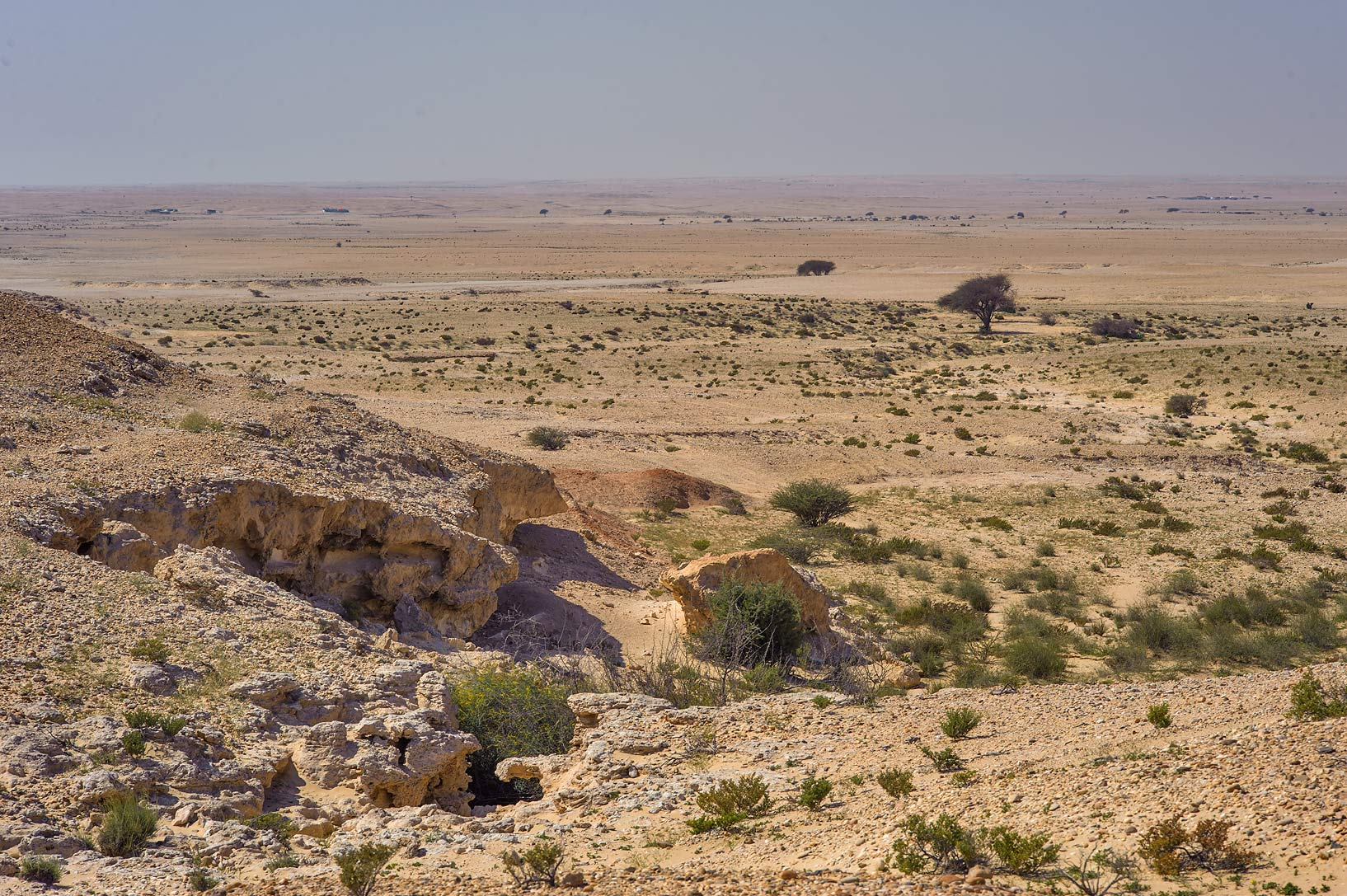
- Limestone escarpments near Al Kharrara

- Location within Qatar
- Coordinates: 24°54′2″N 51°10′17″E
- Country: Qatar
- Municipality: Al Wakrah Municipality
- Zone: Zone 95
- District no.: 683

Area
  - Total: 12.4 km^{2} (4.8 sq mi)
- Elevation: 45 m (148 ft)

Al Kharrara (Arabic: الخرارة, romanized: Al-Kharārah; also spelled Al Harrarah) is a village in Qatar, in the municipality of Al Wakrah. The closest sizable city is Mesaieed, located to the east. It is a desert area, characterized by high aridity and the presence of grazing animals such as dromedary camels, goats and sheep.

== Etymology ==
The village's name comes from the Arabic word khar, which roughly means "the sound of running water". As the area consists of varying elevations and several hills, the process of surface runoff is highly noticeable during the wet months.

== Geography ==
Common vegetation found in Al Kharrara include Zilla spinosa, Polycarpaea repens, Pteranthus dichotomus, Taverniera aegyptiaca, and Cullen plicatum.

Al Kharrara is situated in south-central Qatar. The villages of Al Aamriya and Umm Hawta in Al Rayyan Municipality are nearby to the west. It forms part of the southern desert region, which occupies 34.7% of Qatar's total area. Of the four sub-regions of the southern desert, Al Kharrara is a part of the southern zone of the Miocene-Tiwar sub-area.

The area around Al Kharrarah is part of a region characterized by Miocene-era formations that are distinct from the surrounding older rock types. These formations formed in a more recent geological period and in a different marine and continental environment compared to the surrounding areas. In terms of terrain, Al Kharrarah is part of a region characterized by a mix of rocky plains (hamada), hills and sand dunes. Elevations exceed 60 metres (200 ft) in some areas.

== History ==
Inscriptions dedicated to the pre-Islamic Nabataean goddess Manāt were found in Al Kharrara.

In J. G. Lorimer's 1908 Gazetteer of the Persian Gulf, he refers Al Kharrara as a Bedouin outpost that lies "20 miles south of Dohah and 6 from the east coast, between Naqiyān and Jabalat-at-Tuwar". He noted the presence of a masonry well, 27 fathoms deep, containing good water.

== Industry ==
The Qatar Primary Materials Company has centered its dune sand extraction operations here due to the area's relatively large deposits.

== Sports ==
The second stage of the Sealine Cross-Country Rally, which runs for 345.89 km (214.93 mi), starts in Al Kharrara and ends in Sealine Beach (a section of Mesaieed).

== Gallery ==
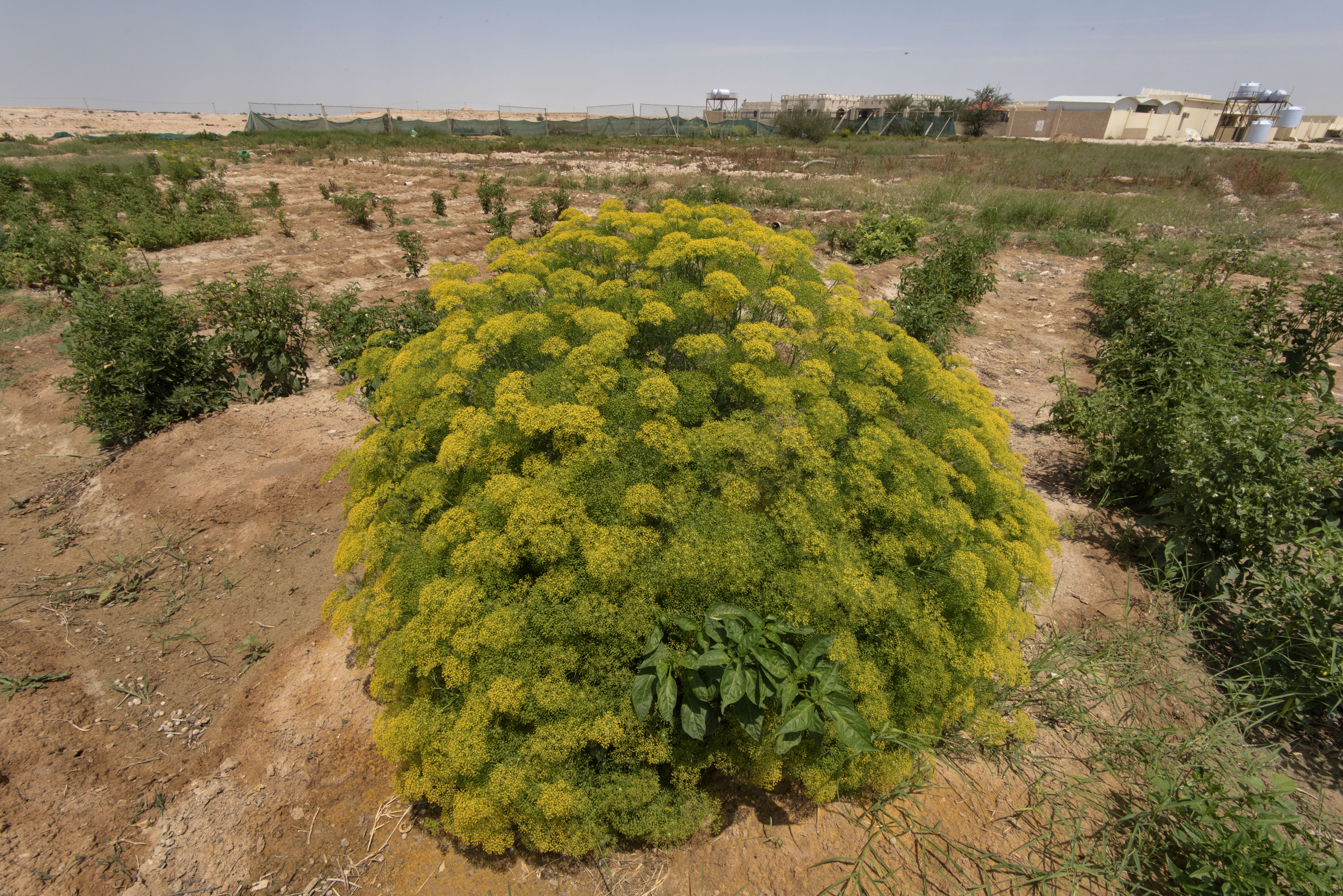
Small farm with blooming fennel in Al Kharrara

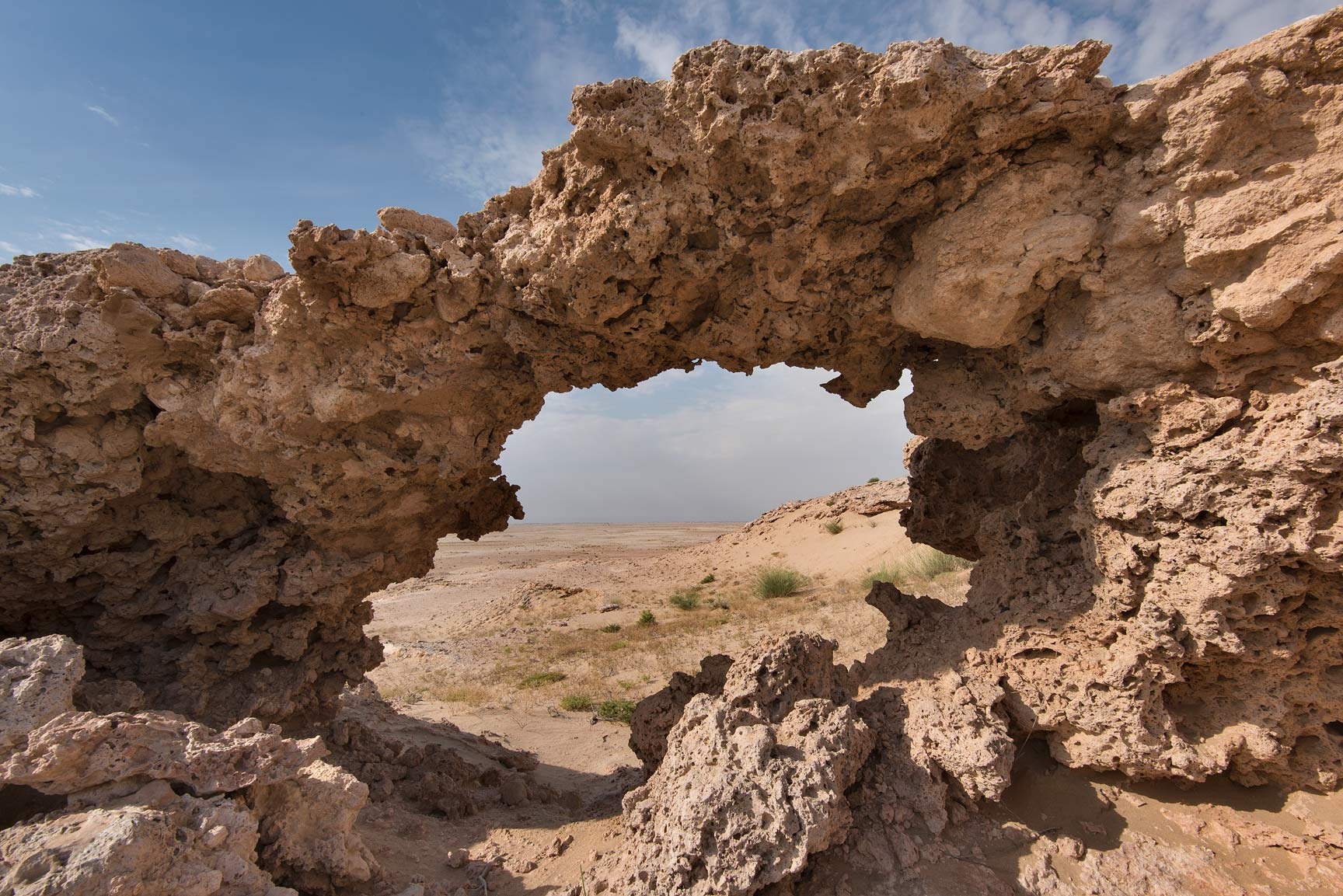
Limestone arch in Al Kharrara

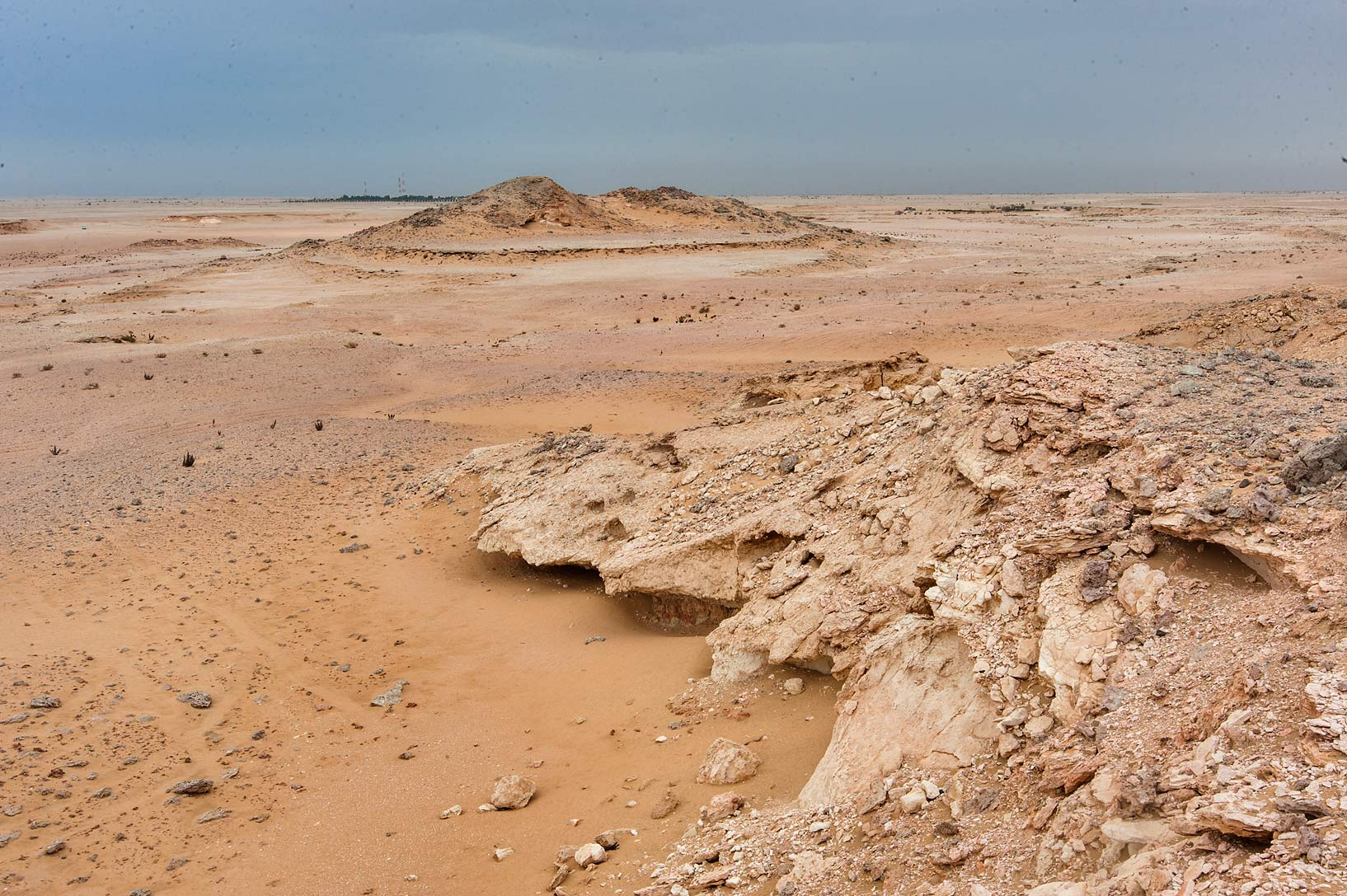
View of Al Kharrara from a mountain slope

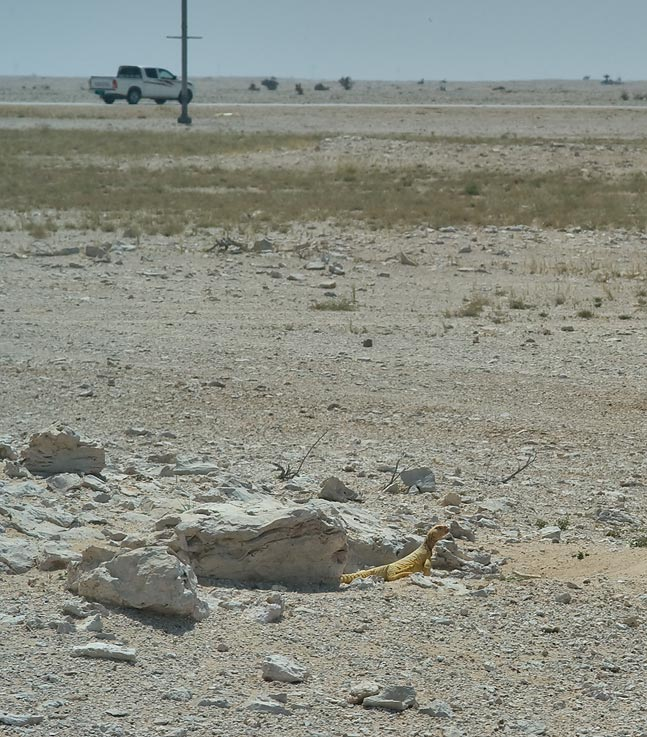
A dhub (Uromastyx aegyptia) near its burrow in Al Kharrara

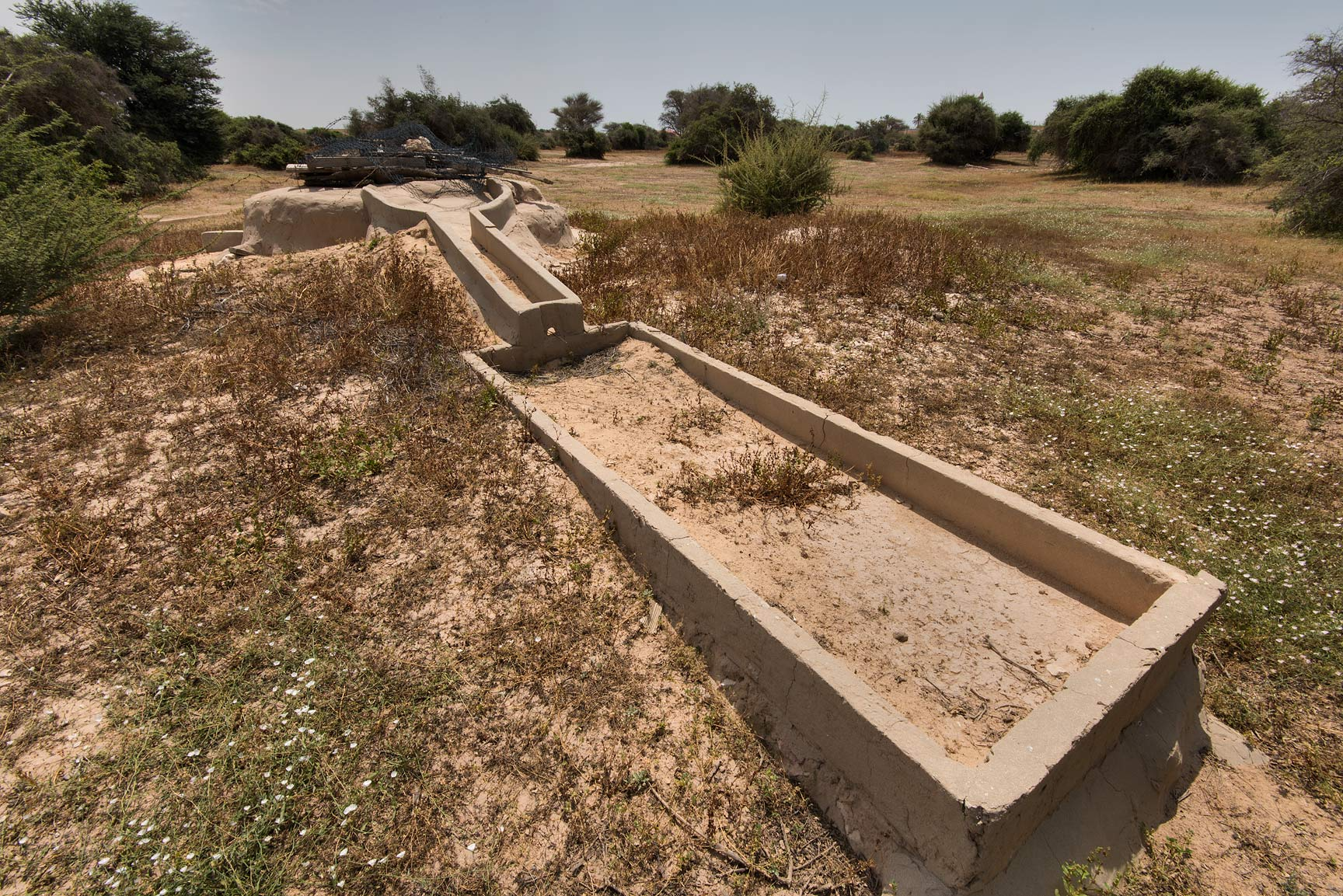
Old water well in Al Kharrara
