= Hamad Port =

Seaport in Qatar

Coordinates: 25.015°N 51.602°E

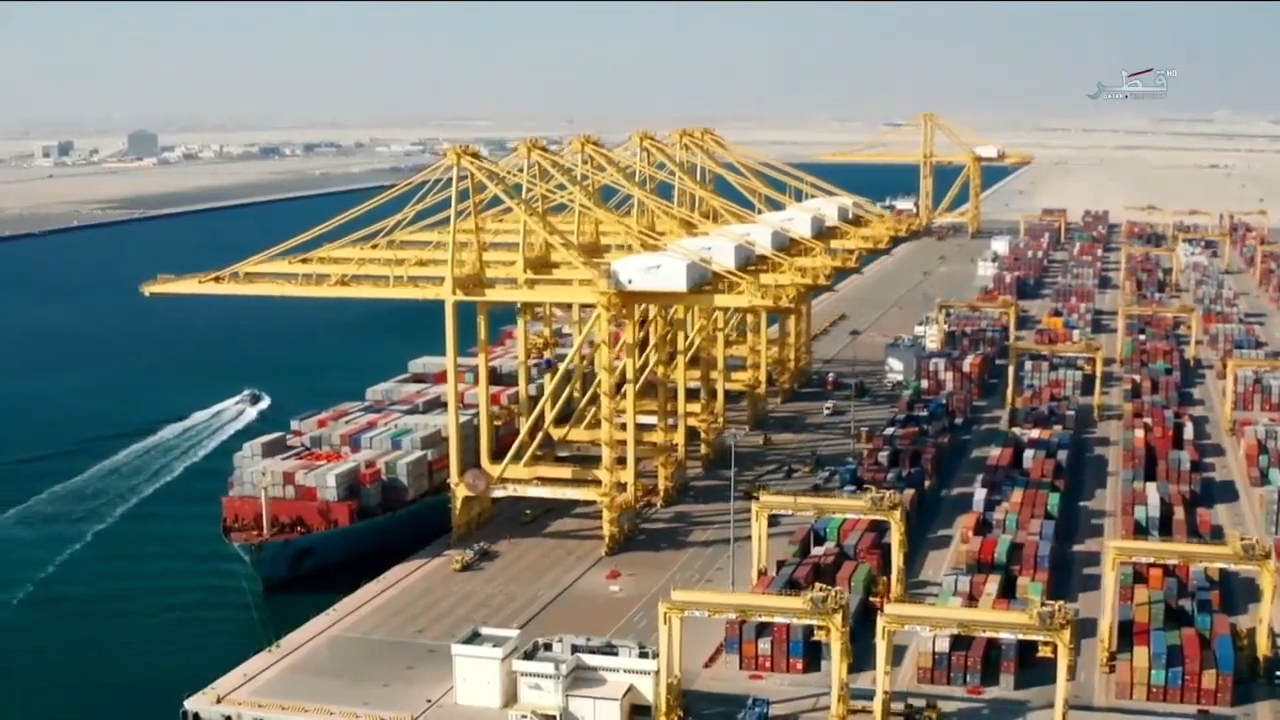
Overhead view of Hamad Port

Hamad Port is Qatar's main seaport, located south of Doha in the Umm Al-Houl area. Construction of the port began in 2010; it became operational in December 2016. It was officially opened in September 2017, and is expected to become fully operational by 2020. Capable of handling up to 7.8 million tonnes of products annually, the bulk of trade which passes through the port consists of food and building materials.

== History ==
First unveiled in June 2007, construction of the port began in June 2010. Umm Al-Houl, an area south of the capital Doha and near to industrial city Mesaieed, was selected as the location for the port. Costs of the new port were reported to be $7.4 bn. The first shipment to Hamad Port was made in July 2015 by the heavy-lift ship Zhen Hua 10, containing cranes that were planned to be used to unload goods. Commercial operations at the port were officially launched in December 2015. It was announced that the port would be operational in December 2016.

In November 2016, German company Siemens signed a $12.4 mn energy deal to provide power to Hamad Port. An expansion of the port was announced in June 2017, with approximately $550 mn worth of contracts being rewarded.

The port is part of the Maritime Silk Road that runs from the Chinese coast to the south via the southern tip of India to Mombasa, from there through the Red Sea via the Suez Canal to the Mediterranean, there to the Upper Adriatic region to the northern Italian hub of Trieste with its rail connections to Central Europe, Eastern Europe and the North Sea.

=== Operations during the 2017 Qatar diplomatic crisis ===
At the onset of the 2017 Qatar diplomatic crisis, which began on June 5, much of the traffic to Hamad Port was put to a stop due to the banning of Qatar-flagged ships from seaports in Bahrain, Saudi Arabia, the UAE and Egypt. This prompted the port authority to set up new direct shipping routes, which as of June 2017, included India-based Mundra Port and Jawaharlal Nehru Port, and Oman's Sohar Port. Port officials stated that in June 2017, the first month of the crisis, the port received 212 ships.

According to a remark made by a port official in July 2017, the only substantial change that occurred to the port's operation was the changing of transit port from UAE's Jebel Ali Port to two ports in Oman.

In September 2017, two new maritime shipping lines were launched from the port to enhance the country's trading connections with other ports in Malaysia, China, Turkey, India and Greece.

== Facilities ==
Covering an area of 26km², the port is planned to have livestock, vehicle and general terminals, an offshore supply depot, a facility for the Qatari coast guards, and a grain facility. The facility for the Qatari coast guards consists of a 4.5km² offshore naval base.

== Transport ==
Currently, the elevated Hamad Port Metro Station is under construction, having been launched during Phase 2B. Once completed, it will be part of Doha Metro's Red Line South.
