= Al Karaana =

Al Karaana الكرعانة
- Village
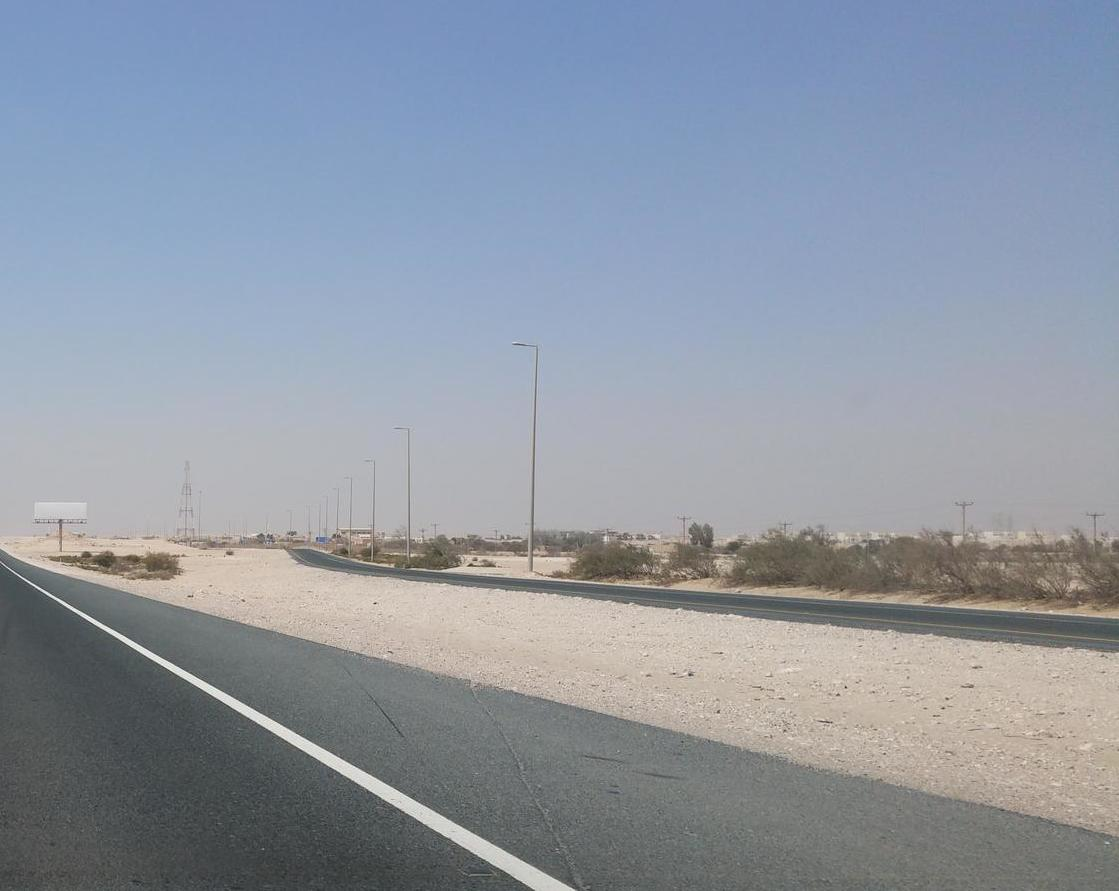
- Turn off to Al Karanaa off Salwa Road.

- Location within Qatar
- Coordinates: 25°00′40″N 51°02′40″E
- Country: Qatar
- Municipality: Al Rayyan
- Zone: Zone 83
- District no.: 529

Area
  - Total: 15.5 km^{2} (6.0 sq mi)
- Elevation: 52 m (171 ft)

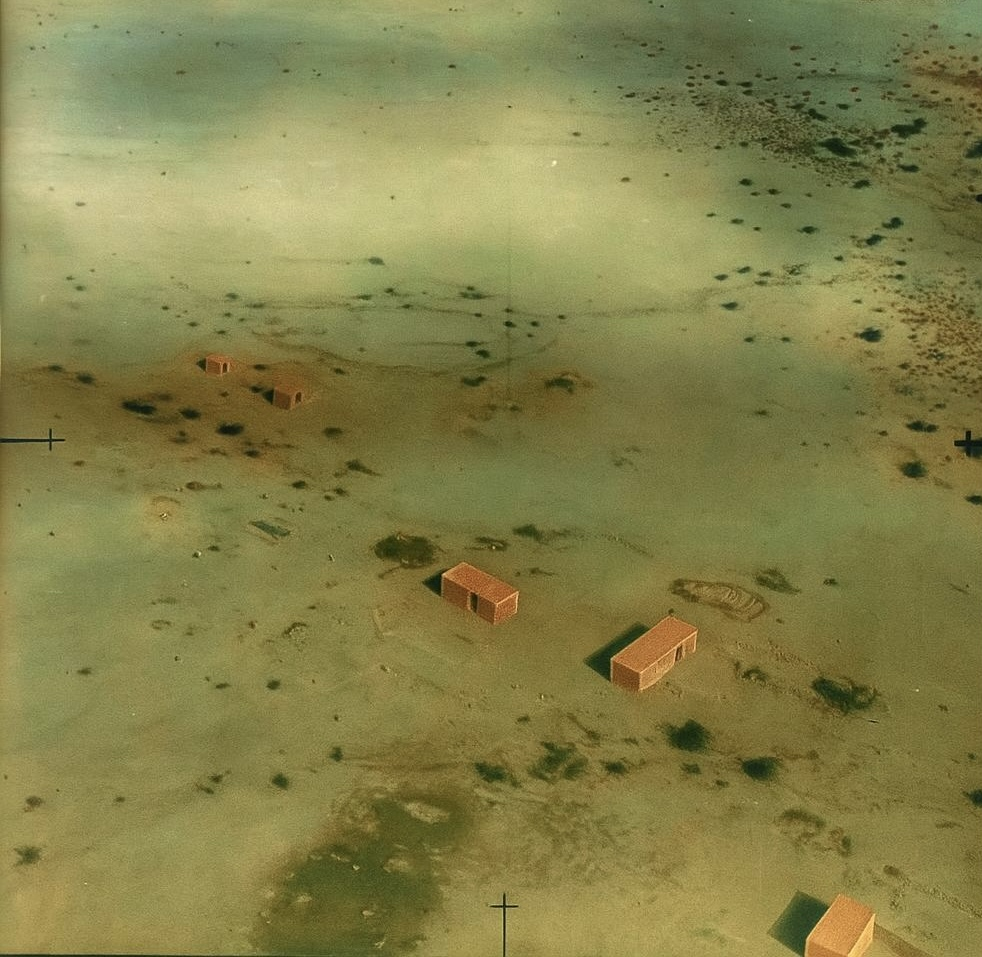
Aerial view of Al Karaana in 1934.

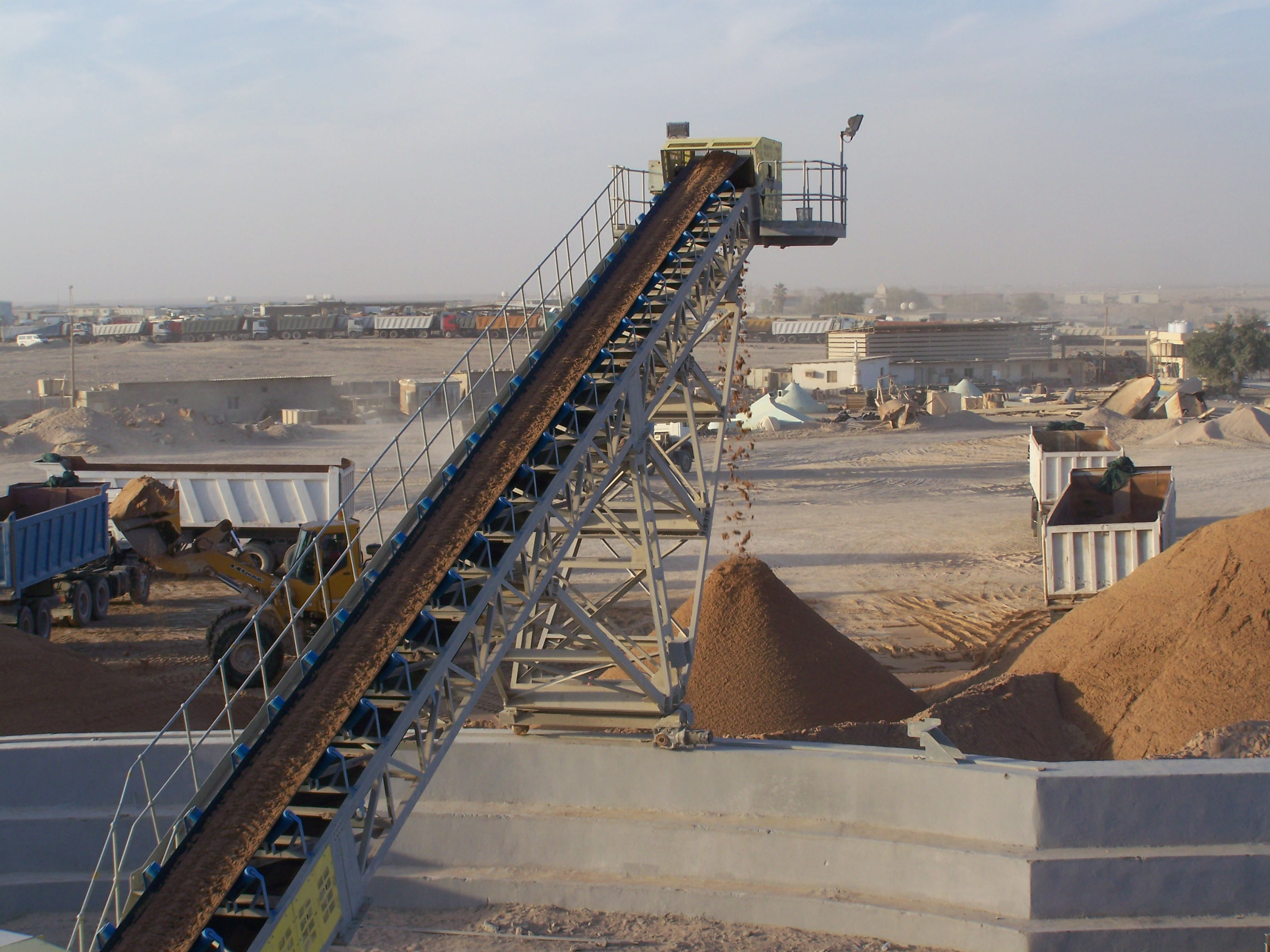
Sand stockpile and conveyor at the Sahara Sand Washing Plant in Al Karaana.

Al Karaana (Arabic: الكرعانة, romanized: Al Kir‘ānah) is a Qatari village located in the municipality of Al Rayyan. It used to be part of the Jariyan Al Batnah municipality before the municipality was incorporated into Al Rayyan. It is situated around 60 kilometres (37 mi) to the south-west of the capital Doha.

Historically, it has been regarded as one of the most significant population centers in southern Qatar, being established in the 1920s. It hosts one of the three major landfill sites in the country, being used mainly for sewage wastes.

== Etymology ==
Originating from the Arabic term karaa, which can be translated as "rainwater" or "fresh water", Al Karaana was named after a local well which yielded water of exceptional quality.

== History ==
In J.G. Lorimer's 1908 handbook Gazetteer of the Persian Gulf, Al Karaana was described as a stopover on the route from Hofuf to Doha which contained a 150-feet deep masonry well yielding good water. It was not until the 1920s that a village was established here. Historically, it was of strategic importance due to being considered a gateway to the south of Qatar.

The Royal Air Force looked into constructing a landing strip in Al Karaana in 1934 for its fleet. According to S.F. Vincent, "Course was then set from Raiyan to Kara'ana. On the north-eastern half of this track several water—holes were observed, but none on the south-western half. At Kara'ana a good well was seen, with a few buildings nearby. Immediately south of these the area, it was considered, would form a good landing ground provided labour was employed to clear camel-thorn and small bushes. At Sabsab, approximately 2 miles south-east of Kara'ana, an area of greenery, containing a fairly large well, was observed to have sunk considerably. From Kara'ana the course to Salwa was over an arid and rocky area, on which it would be extremely difficult to execute a successful forced landing."

During the 1960s, several members of the Al Murrah tribe, who were increasingly transitioning from nomadic pastoralism to fixed settlement, relocated to the town. In 1970, the Salwa Highway was completed, becoming the first road to link Al Karaana and nearby settlements with the capital Doha. It also connected to the border with Saudi Arabia.

== Geography ==
Al Karaana is situated in south-west Qatar. It is situated around 60 kilometres (37 mi) to the south-west of Doha, 44 kilometres (27 mi) to the south-west of the Doha Industrial Area and about the same distance north-east of Abu Samra, a village that constitutes Qatar's southern border with Saudi Arabia. The village of Al Wosail is nearby.

The Al Karaana Depression is situated to the east of the village off of Salwa Road. There are various trees and a fair cover of grass in the depression. There is evidence of past visitation by nomadic herdsman.

=== Al Karaana Lagoon ===
Ten lagoons in the area, known collectively as Al Karanaa Lagoon, span over 4 km² and suffered from serious environmental issues after their inauguration in 2006 as a result of the dumping of untreated wastewater discharged by tankers. Additionally, over 200,000 m³ treated wastewater is discharged by the nearby Al Karaana Treatment Plant on a daily basis. A preliminary ecological survey done by Qatari authorities revealed that, despite the lagoon's environmental issues, it was teeming with wildlife. Over 55 bird species were recorded, including six vulnerable species, four mammal species were recorded, two reptile species were recorded, and various fish species were recorded, the latter being introduced to the area by birds.

In 2015, the Public Works Authority (Ashghal) contracted with French firm Egis Group to rehabilitate the lagoons. Ashghal also awarded a contract to another French company, Suez, in December 2017. The rehabilitation project was completed in November 2019. Approximately 40 tonnes of sludge were transferred from the lagoons to a nearby landfill. As part of the project, three artificial lagoons were installed with a capacity for up to 2.4 million m³ of treated effluent from the Al Karaana Treatment Plant. Furthermore, two evaporation ponds were built to store up to 1.2 million m³ of liquid wastewater on a temporary basis until a new wastewater treatment plant is constructed. With no contaminated soil or sediments, the area is now home to various species of birds, fish and amphibians.

== Economy ==
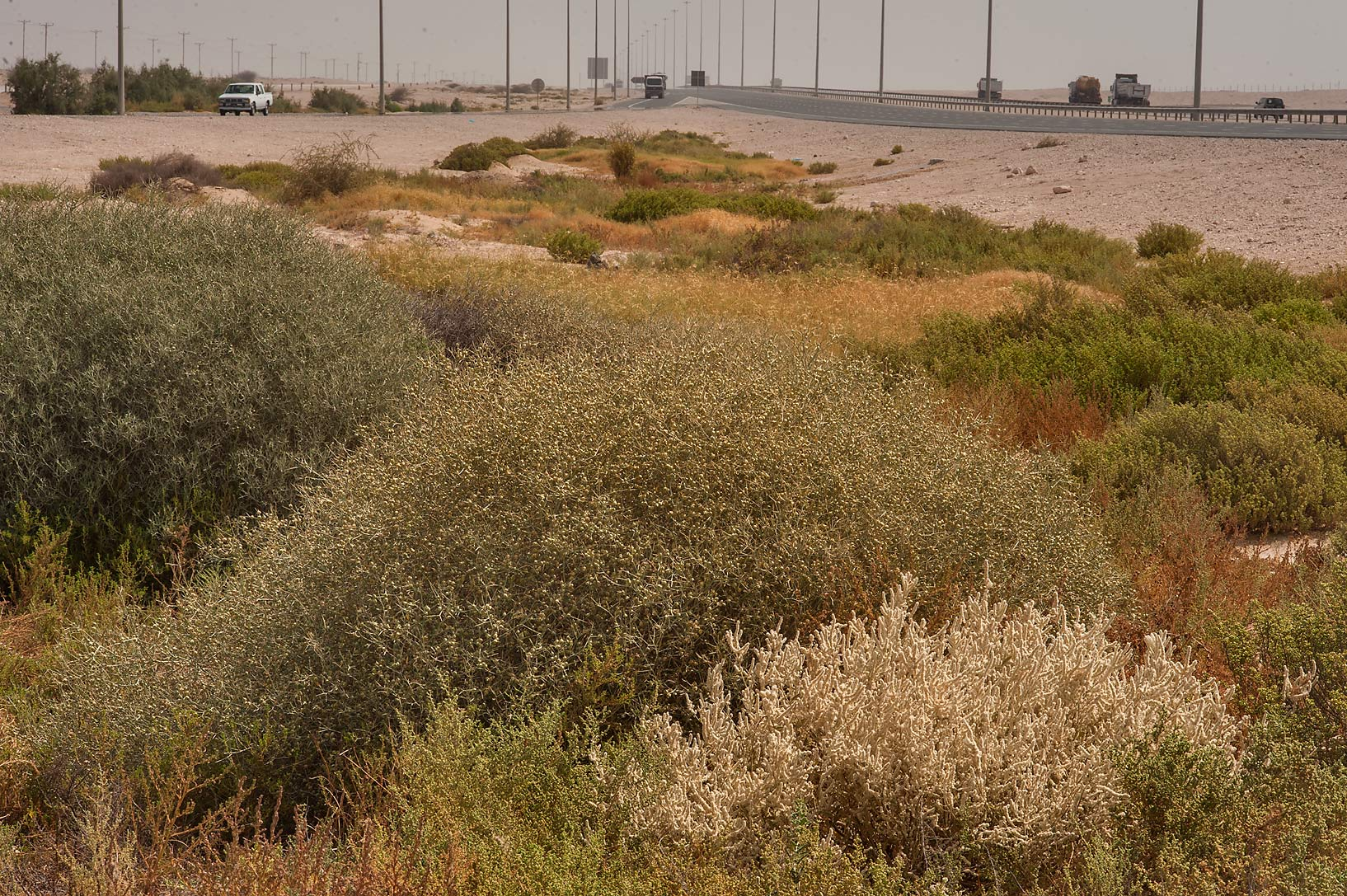
Vegetation in a depression near Al Kaarana off of Salwa Road.

The Qatar Primary Materials Company established the Sahara Sand Washing Plant in Al Karaana. Sand is treated here to meet construction specifications. This plant was of importance for building projects related to the 2022 FIFA World Cup.

As part of Qatar's efforts to diversify its economy under the National Vision 2030, Al Karaana was designated as the site of a major Special Economic Zone (SEZ) developed by Manateq, the national agency for economic zone planning. Encompassing nearly 45 square kilometers, it is the largest of Qatar's SEZs and is designed to support industrial, manufacturing, and logistics activities. The zone will include infrastructure for storage, wholesale trade, and rail-connected dry port facilities, as well as spaces for commercial and residential use. Sustainability features, including energy-efficient systems, water conservation measures, and provisions for sustainable transport are also included in the development.

== Healthcare ==
A health care center is found in the village.

== Central Municipal Council ==
Although free elections of the Central Municipal Council were first instated in Qatar in 1999, Al Karaana has only served as the seat of one of the 29 municipal constituencies since the fifth municipal elections in 2015. In the fifth session, Al Karaana was the seat of constituency no. 21 which also included several settlements along Salwa Road, among which were Al Aamriya, Umm Bab, Abu Samra, Rawdat Arnab, Al Rekayya, Al Kharrara, Al Hemaila, and Al Mashabiya. Nayef Ali Al-Ahbabi was elected as the constituency representative.

== Qatar National Master Plan ==
The Qatar National Master Plan (QNMP) is described as a "spatial representation of the Qatar National Vision 2030". As part of the QNMP's Urban Centre plan, which aims to implement development strategies in 28 central hubs that will serve their surrounding communities, Al Karaana has been designated a District Centre, which is the lowest designation.

Al Kaarana's District Centre is set to be constructed in an adjacent area to the village's current nucleus. Qatar-based Private Engineering Office has been tasked with renovating the old centre. The village's importance lies in its status as the first substantial settlement near the southern border other than Abu Samra. This, too, is its weakness as its isolation separates it from many necessary public services as well as the already-developed Doha transit network. Thus, a priority has been placed on creating a village with high pedestrian accessibility as well as road connectivity. Among the new planned buildings are a civil services complexes which includes a police department and emergency services center, two mosques, a 24,000 m² primary health care centre, a community centre and youth centre.

== Education ==
The following schools are located in Al Karaana:

Name of School	Curriculum	Grade	Genders	Official Website	Ref
Al Karaana Girls School	Independent	Kindergarten – Secondary	Female-only	N/A	
Al Karaana Boys School	Independent	Kindergarten – Secondary	Male-only	N/A	
