= Zone 82, Qatar =

Zone 82
- Zone
- Interactive map of Zone 82
- Coordinates: 25.205923°N 51.173141°E
- Country: Qatar
- Municipality: Al-Shahaniya
- Blocks: 65

Area
  - Total: 454.1 km^{2} (175.3 sq mi)

Population (2015)
  - Total: 26,258
  - Density: 57.82/km^{2} (149.8/sq mi)
- Time zone: UTC+03 (Arabia Standard Time)
- ISO 3166 code: QA-SH

Zone 82 is a zone in the municipality of Al-Shahaniya in the state of Qatar. The main district recorded in the 2015 population census was Rawdat Rashed.

Other districts which fall within its administrative boundaries are Abu Nakhla, Al Sahla Al Shamaliya, Umm Al Maqarin, Umm Al Zubar Al Qibliya, Umm Al Zubar East, Umm Lebrak, Umm Wishah, Wadi Lejmal Al Shamali.

== Demographics ==
As of the 2010 census, the zone comprised 702 housing units and 456 establishments. There were 6,046 people living in the zone, of which 88% were male and 12% were female. Out of the 6,046 inhabitants, 91% were 20 years of age or older and 9% were under the age of 20. The literacy rate was 90.1%.

Employed persons made up 88% of the total population. Females accounted for 6% of the working population, while males accounted for 94% of the working population.

Year	Population
1986	970
1997	2,640
2004	4,762
2010	6,046
2015	26,258

== Land use ==
The Ministry of Municipality and Environment (MME) breaks down land use in the zone as follows.

Area (km^{2})	Developed land (km^{2})	Undeveloped land (km^{2})	Residential (km^{2})	Commercial/ Industrial (km^{2})	Education/ Health (km^{2})	Farming/ Green areas (km^{2})	Other uses (km^{2})
454.12	59.75	394.37	0.31	0.50	0.04	17.03	41.87
