= Al Sahla Al Shamaliya =

Al Sahla Al Shamaliya السهلة الشمالية
- Village
- Location in Qatar
- Coordinates: 25.17778°N 51.16204°E
- Country: Qatar
- Municipality: Al-Shahaniya
- Zone: Zone 82
- District no.: 494

Area
  - Total: 4.0 sq mi (10.4 km^{2})

Al Sahla Al Shamaliya (Arabic: السهلة الشمالية) is a village in Qatar located in the municipality of Al-Shahaniya.

== Etymology ==
According to the Ministry of Municipality and Environment, the first part of its name, sahla (also spelled sahala) roughly means "vast, expansive plain" in Arabic. The second part, shamaliya, translates to "northern"; this denotes its location north of another area bearing the same name.

== Geography ==
The village of Umm Al Zubar Al Qibliya is nearby to the east while the village of Umm Wishah is to the west.
