= Qatar Polo Club =

The Qatar Polo Club is a polo club in Qatar, founded in 2023 under the aegis of the Ministry of Sports and Youth. It hosted its inaugural tournament in December 2025; the Polo AlMarsa Championship Cup was won by Team Lusail.
