= Salah bin Ghanim Al Ali =

Qatari politician

Salah bin Ghanim Al Ali Al Maadeed

Minister of Youth and Sports (Culture and Sports)
- In office October 2021 – 8 January 2024
- Monarch: Tamim bin Hamad Al Thani
- Prime Minister: Khalid bin Khalifa bin Abdul Aziz Al Thani; Mohammed bin Abdulrahman bin Jassim Al Thani
- Succeeded by: Hamad Bin Khalifa Bin Ahmed Al-Thani

Personal details
- Born: August 3, 1966 (age 59) Doha
- Occupation: Politician

Salah bin Ghanim Al Ali (born 1966) is a Qatari politician. He served as Minister of Youth and Sports from October 2021 until 8 January 2024.

== Education ==
Al-Ali studied Management Engineering at the University of the Pacific.

== Career ==
From 1998 to 2006, Al-Ali was appointed Vice Chairman of State Audit Bureau in Qatar and was then appointed as chairman in 2006.

In 2007, he was appointed to the Qatar National Committee for Integrity and Transparency as Chairman of ABQ.

Al-Ali was appointed Minister of Youth and Sports in June 2013. In February 2016, he became Minister of Culture and Sports. Al-Ali was appointed as Qatar's Minister of Sports and Youth in October 2021.

He is the chairman of Barwa Group, a listed business on the Qatar Stock Exchange.
