= Umm Al Zubar Al Qibliya =

Umm Al Zubar Al Qibliya أم الزبار القبلية
- Village
- Location in Qatar
- Coordinates: 25°10′35″N 51°15′07″E
- Country: Qatar
- Municipality: Al-Shahaniya
- Zone: Zone 82
- District no.: 491

Area
  - Total: 1.6 sq mi (4.1 km^{2})
- Elevation: 151 ft (46 m)

Umm Al Zubar Al Qibliya (Arabic: أم الزبار القبلية, romanized: Umm az Zubār al Qiblīyah; also known as Umm Al Zubar West and Umm Al Zubar Al Gharbiya) is a village in Qatar located in the municipality of Al-Shahaniya. Located roughly 30 km away from the capital Doha, it is one of the larger villages in the country, accommodating around 150 Qatari families.

== Etymology ==
In Arabic, umm is translated to "mother", and is a common prefix attached to a name in order to signify a geographical feature. The landscape is typified by small mounds, which is what the Arabic term zubar refers to. The qibliya ("west") portion of its name was given due to it being west of the rawda (depression) from which it derives its name, Umm Al Zubar, and also so that it could be differentiated from a smaller village lying to the immediate east called Umm Al Zubar East.

== Geography ==
It is situated closely to the districts of Al Sailiya and Mebaireek in Al Rayyan Municipality. The closest sizable city is Rawdat Rashed.

== Infrastructure ==
Poor infrastructure is an issue in the village. The electric system is reported to be unreliable and outdated, and there is a lack of sanitation services, facilities and roads.

Streets are narrow and mostly unpaved. The closest paved major road to the village is the Rawdat Rashed Road, which is also known as the "road of death" due to the high number of accidents that occur on it. This road separates Umm Al Zubar East from its neighbor to the east, Umm Al Zubar East.

In 2018, the Public Works Authority announced that it would implement a major project in the village in starting late 2018 which will involve the paving and construction of streets, the rehabilitation of sidewalks, the addition of lighting posts and development of a sewage system. The Public Works Authority had initially approved the design plans for the streets and access road to the village in January 2017.
