= Al Khaldiya (Qatar) =

Al Khaldiya الخالدية
- District
- Location within Qatar
- Coordinates: 25°8′47″N 51°17′34″E
- Country: Qatar
- Municipality: Al Rayyan
- Zone no.: Zone 81
- District no.: 481

Area
  - Total: 7.1 km^{2} (2.7 sq mi)

Al Khaldiya (Arabic: الخالدية, romanized: Al Khālidīyah) is a rural district in Qatar, located in the municipality of Al Rayyan. It is known for its farms.

Nearby settlements include Ummahat Owaina to the west and Umm Al Zubar East in Al-Shahaniya Municipality to the north.

== Etymology ==
The district's name has its roots in the Arabic word khalid, which translates to "eternal". According to The Center for Geographic Information Systems of Qatar, this name was given to the area because its lush farms and attractive landscape left a long-lasting impression on visitors.
