= Madinat Al Mawater =

Madinat Al Mawater مدينة المواتر Motor City
- Planned community
- Country: Qatar
- Municipality: Al-Shahaniya

Area
  - Planned community: 0.44 sq mi (1.15 km^{2})
  - Urban: 0.064 sq mi (0.167 km^{2})

Madinat Al Mawater (Arabic: مدينة المواتر, lit. 'Motor City') is a planned community of Rawdat Rashed in the Al-Shahaniya Municipality, central Qatar. Its first phase of construction was launched in May 2016. The community will occupy an area of 1.15 km^{2} and have a developed area of 167,072 m^{2}.

The community is a project of Barwa Group and its construction is being overseen by Qatar-based Insha Contracting and Trading Co. and Hassanesco Trading and Contracting (HCC).

== Geography ==
Located near the Rawdat Rashed Road interchange of Salwa Road in Al-Shahaniya Municipality, the closest town is Rawdat Rashed. It is close to the Aqua Park in Abu Nakhla.

== Development ==
Phase 1, launched in May 2016, developed an area of 34,000 m^{2} of which included 27 showrooms, 10 shops, and a vehicle inspection building. It was contracted to Insha Contracting & Trading.

Construction for Phase 2 was also handed over to Insha Contracting & Trading for a value of QR 112.5 million in May 2017. This phase would see the development of a 35,607 m^{2} area and include 59 showrooms, 176 housing units, 10 shops, and five workshops. Furthermore, crucial infrastructure such as a sewage treatment plant, electrical substations, and roads would be built during this phase.

The third phase was awarded to Hassanesco Trading and Contracting (HCC) in March 2019. The contract, valued at QR 335 million, will be completed in mid-to-late 2020.

According to Barwa Group, upon completion Madinat Al Mawater will accommodate a hotel, a motel, banks, convenience stores, a Civil Defense building and a Traffic Department branch.
