= Ummahat Owaina =

Ummahat Owaina أمهات عوينة
- District
- Location within Qatar
- Coordinates: 25°8′18″N 51°15′58″E
- Country: Qatar
- Municipality: Al Rayyan
- Zone no.: Zone 81
- District no.: 483

Area
  - Total: 13.2 km^{2} (5.1 sq mi)

Ummahat Owaina (Arabic: أمهات عوينة, romanized: Ummahāt ‘Uwaynah) is a district in Qatar, located in the municipality of Al Rayyan.

Nearby settlements include Al Khaldiya to the east and Umm Al Zubar East in Al-Shahaniya Municipality to the north-east.

== Etymology ==
Ummahat is the plural of umm, which is Arabic for "mother", and is commonly used as a prefix for geographic features. The second word, Owaina, is derived from ʿayn, which refers to a natural underground spring. This name arose from an important local spring.
