= Al Mukaynis =

Al Mukaynis مكينس
- District
- Location within Qatar
- Coordinates: 25°07′00″N 51°14′00″E
- Country: Qatar
- Municipality: Al Rayyan
- Zone no.: Zone 81
- District no.: 484

Area
  - Total: 15.8 km^{2} (6.1 sq mi)

Al Mukaynis (Arabic: مكينس; also spelled Mekaines) is a district located in the municipality of Ar Rayyan, Qatar, near Mebaireek. Mudhlem Cave, which translates to "Dark Cave" in Arabic, is located in the area. Nearby Al Rekayya Farms (Irkaya Farms) is a popular bird watching site.

In J.G. Lorimer's Gazetteer of the Persian Gulf, Al Mukaynis was mentioned as a stopover on the route from Hofuf to Doha as early as 1908.

== Etymology ==
The name Al Mukaynis derives from the Arabic term mekainis, a diminutive of maknas, which denotes a habitat frequented by wild animals during periods of extreme heat. The site, formerly a rawda (a type of low-lying area that retains moisture), once served as a seasonal refuge for such wildlife.

== Geography ==
Al Mukaynis is located in south-central Qatar, south of the Doha-Abu Samra road. It forms part of the northern zone of the southern desert region, which occupies 34.7% of Qatar's total area. Of the four sub-regions of the southern desert, Al Mukaynis is a part of the Miocene-Tiwar sub-area. The area around Al Mukaynis is part of a region characterized by a mix of rocky plains (hamada) and sand dunes. It is located in a zone where the landscape begins to show more varied topographical features compared to areas further north.

Al Mukaynis is near an area of geological interest, characterized by Miocene-era formations that are distinct from the surrounding older rock types. The surrounding area has a generally undulating surface with elevations not exceeding 60 metres (200 ft) above sea level.

=== Climate ===
The following is climate data for Al Mukaynis obtained from Qatar Meteorology Department.

Climate data for Al Mukaynis
| Month | Jan | Feb | Mar | Apr | May | Jun | Jul | Aug | Sep | Oct | Nov | Dec | Year |
|---|---|---|---|---|---|---|---|---|---|---|---|---|---|
| Mean daily maximum °C (°F) | 22.8 (73.0) | 25.0 (77.0) | 29.4 (84.9) | 35.6 (96.1) | 41.1 (106.0) | 43.9 (111.0) | 44.4 (111.9) | 44.4 (111.9) | 41.7 (107.1) | 36.7 (98.1) | 29.4 (84.9) | 24.4 (75.9) | 34.9 (94.8) |
| Daily mean °C (°F) | 17.2 (63.0) | 19.2 (66.6) | 23.1 (73.6) | 28.6 (83.5) | 33.6 (92.5) | 35.9 (96.6) | 37.2 (99.0) | 37.2 (99.0) | 34.4 (93.9) | 29.7 (85.5) | 24.2 (75.6) | 19.2 (66.6) | 28.3 (83.0) |
| Mean daily minimum °C (°F) | 11.7 (53.1) | 13.3 (55.9) | 16.7 (62.1) | 21.7 (71.1) | 26.1 (79.0) | 27.8 (82.0) | 30.0 (86.0) | 30.0 (86.0) | 27.2 (81.0) | 22.8 (73.0) | 18.9 (66.0) | 13.9 (57.0) | 21.7 (71.0) |
| Average precipitation mm (inches) | 7.5 (0.30) | 7.7 (0.30) | 12.9 (0.51) | 4.2 (0.17) | 0.5 (0.02) | 0 (0) | 0 (0) | 0 (0) | 0 (0) | 0.5 (0.02) | 2.5 (0.10) | 21 (0.8) | 56.8 (2.22) |
| Average relative humidity (%) | 68 | 63 | 54 | 45 | 37 | 36 | 39 | 48 | 50 | 55 | 61 | 72 | 52 |
