= Qatar Football Association =

Association of Qatar football

AFC
- Short name: QFA
- Founded: 1960
- Headquarters: Doha, Qatar
- FIFA affiliation: 1972
- AFC affiliation: 1974
- President: Jassim Rashid Al Buenain
- Website: www.qfa.qa

The Qatar Football Association (Arabic: الاتحاد القطري لكرة القدم, romanized: al-Ittiḥād al-Qaṭariyy li-Kurat al-Qadam) is the governing body of football in Qatar. The QFA was founded in 1960 and is based in Doha, Qatar. It became a member of FIFA in 1972 and of AFC in 1974. The Qatar Football Association organizes the main leagues of the Qatar football league system: Qatar Stars League, Qatari Second Division, including domestic cups: Qatar Cup, Emir of Qatar Cup, Sheikh Jassim Cup, Qatari Stars Cup and Qatar FA Cup. The association is also responsible for the men's, U-17, U-20, U-23, women's national teams and the local women's, youth and futsal football leagues.

== President ==
Jassim Rashid Al Buenain is currently the president of the Association. He was elected on June 2, 2023, and succeeded Sheikh Hamad Bin Khalifa Bin Ahmed Al-Thani who held the position since 2005.

== History ==
The advent of football at Qatar dates back to the year of 1948, accompanied by the arrival of oil companies. The new game's popularity expanded immediately, which led to the establishment of Al Najah as the country's first football club in 1950. Interest in football developed rapidly in the 1950s. Under the supervision of Qatar Oil Company (today QatarEnergy), the first football tournament ever in Qatar was held at the city of Dukhan. Despite the participation of several Doha teams – including Al Najah – host team Dukhan managed to win the 1951 Izzadeen tournament. Qatar Oil Company replaced the old competition with a new one, Pukett Cup kicked off during the 1957 season, Al Najah went on to win the cup for the first time in their history. The Qatar Football Association (QFA) was founded in 1960 to govern football in Qatar and became a provisional member of FIFA in 1970 and was fully affiliated in 1972. In 1974, it became a member of the Asian Football Confederation (AFC). The Association organized the first Qatar League in 1972–73.

Whether locally or regionally, rules and regulations were not very restrictive about players moving from one club to another, just a resignation letter and 10 Indian rupees were required of the player who wished to move. This undemanding system was in effect until the year 1962. The first venue with a grass pitch in the Gulf region was the Doha Stadium, which was inaugurated in 1962. Qatar built the Khalifa International Stadium in the 1970s to serve as the country's iconic sports stadium. From 2003 to 2017, the stadium was refurbished and expanded. The Emir Cup final was held there in 2017. In 2022 it will host World Cup matches.

In 1981, Qatar's national youth team took part in the FIFA Junior World Cup in Australia, surprisingly beating Brazil 4–3 in the quarterfinals and England 2–1 in the semifinals. The final was lost 0–4 against West Germany.

Qatar's football team participated in the 1984 Summer Olympics in Los Angeles.

In 1988 and 2011, Qatar hosted the AFC Asian Cup, which is the biggest football event on the continent.

Qatar hosted the Gulf Cup tournament in 1976, 1992 and 2004, winning the biggest tournament for national teams in the region in 1992 and 2004. In 2014, Qatar lifted the trophy for the third time after beating host Saudi Arabia in the final.

From 13 to 28 April 1995, the 10th FIFA World Youth Championship was held in Doha, which was won by Argentina.

In 2019 and 2020, Qatar hosted the FIFA Club World Cup.

From 30 November to 18 December 2021, Qatar hosted the 2021 FIFA Arab Cup. Sixteen Arab teams competed in stadiums of the 2022 FIFA World Cup. In the semifinals, Qatar lost to eventual champion Algeria but defeated Egypt 5-4 on penalties in the 3rd place playoff to secure the third place in the Arab Cup.

Qatar also hosted the 2022 FIFA World Cup. The tournament was held from 20 November to 18 December 2022. However they lost all 3 group stage matches (against Ecuador, Senegal and the Netherlands, respectively) and became the first team to be eliminated from the World Cup.

The 2023 AFC Asian Cup was held in Qatar.

In September 2023, the Qatar Football Association (QFA) and Aspire Academy signed a cooperation agreement to further develop the coaching education system and enhance their joint expertise.

== Leagues ==
=== Qatar Stars League (Also known as EXPO Stars League) ===
- The QSL is the highest football league in Qatar and consists of 12 teams.

=== Qatar Second Division (Also known as Qatargas League) ===
- The QSD is the second highest football league in Qatar and consists of 8 teams.

=== Reserve League ===
- The Reserve League is a competition in which 12 teams play each other once during the season. There is no return game.

=== Qatar Amateur League ===
- The QAL was established in 2013 to provide amateur teams with the opportunity to compete against each other in an official competition. The number of participating team varies every year.

=== University League ===
- The University League is a knockout tournament which was established in 2013 by the Supreme Committee of Delivery and Legacy. This gives university and college students the opportunity to develop their football skills.

=== School League ===
- The School League is a knockout tournament which was also established in 2013, with the aim to promote young people's interest in sports.

=== Asian Communities Football Tournament ===
- The league was established in 2012 to promote integration and involve the local community. It is played in a knockout system.

=== Qatar Community Football League ===
- The community league organized by QSL, with four adult divisions, two leagues for boys and two leagues for girls, was established by the supreme committee in 2016.

=== Qatar Futsal League ===
- The Qatar Futsal League was founded in 2007 and consists of 10 teams. The winner of the league automatically qualifies for the AFC Futsal Club Championship.

== Domestic competitions ==
=== Cups ===
- Emir of Qatar Cup - The Emir Cup was founded in 1972 and is the biggest Tournament in Qatar.
- Sheikh Jassim Cup - The Sheikh Jassim Cup was founded in 1977 and takes place every year at the beginning of the season.
- Qatar Cup - The Qatar Cup was founded in 1994 and is played by the top four QSL teams at the end of each season.
- Qatari Stars Cup - The Ooredoo Cup was founded in 2009. The premier league teams play in a knockout competition. Teams are divided into two groups and are allowed to field both U19 and U23 players.
- Qatar FA Cup - The tournament was announced right after the 2020-21 Qatar Stars League ended, were the bottom 8 teams from the Qatar Stars League and the entire Qatari Second Division participate.

== National teams ==
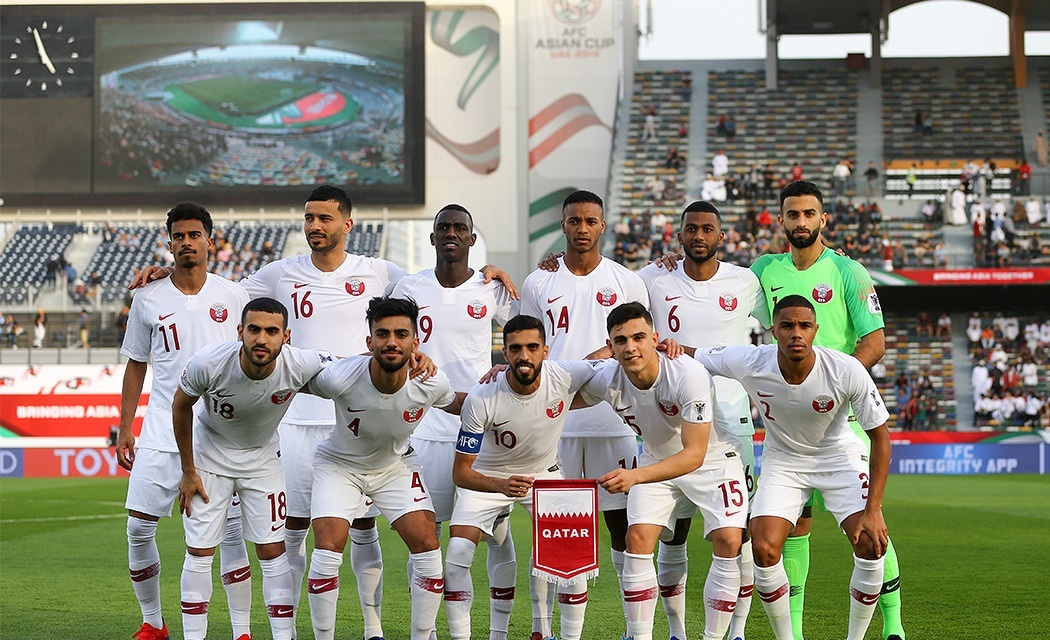
Qatar national team during the 2019 AFC Asian Cup.

- Qatar national football team
- Qatar national under-23 football team
- Qatar national under-20 football team
- Qatar national under-17 football team
- Qatar women's national football team

== Training camps and academy ==
Aspire Zone - The Aspire Zone in Doha, Qatar, is a popular training camp for European football clubs, where teams such as Bayern Munich, PSV Eindhoven, FC Red Bull Salzburg, AFC Ajax and FC Zenit prepare for the upcoming matches in their leagues.

Aspire Academy - Located in the Aspire Zone, the sports academy was founded in 2004 and supports local athletes.

Training grounds for the 2022 FIFA World Cup - As 41 training grounds are created, each national team had its own facility with FIFA-standard lightning systems and two natural grass pitches identical to the grass pitches at each of the eight World Cup stadiums.

== Formation ==
As of 05 August 2025

Position	Name
President	(Qatar) Jassim Rashid Al Buenain
Vice President	(Qatar) Mohammed Khalifa Al Suwaidi
General Secretary	(Qatar) Mansoor Al Ansari
Treasurer	(Qatar) Ahmed Al-Buainain
Technical Director	(Australia) Tim Cahill
Team Coach (Men's)	(Spain) Julen Lopetegui
Team Coach (Women's)	(Qatar) Fedha Al-Abdullah
Media/Communications Manager	(Qatar) Ali Al Salat
Futsal Coordinator	(Qatar) Hamad Al Mannai
Referee Coordinator	(Qatar) Hany Taleb Al Raeesi

== International titles ==
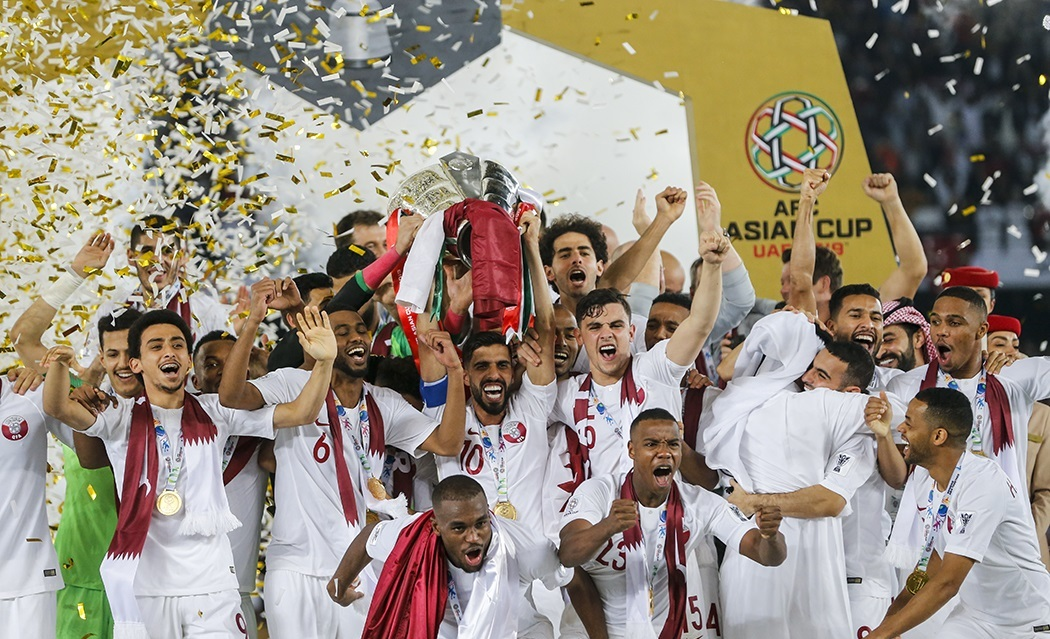
Qatar national team celebrating winning the 2019 AFC Asian Cup.

- 1990 AFC U-16 Championship: Winner
- 1992 Arabian Gulf Cup: Winner
- 2006 Asian Games: Winner
- 2014 WAFF Championship: Winner
- 2014 AFC U-19 Championship: Winner
- 2019 AFC Asian Cup: Winner
- 2023 AFC Asian Cup: Winner

== See also ==
- Football in Qatar
