= Barwa Group =

Real estate company in Doha, Qatar

Barwa
- Company type: Public
- Traded as: QE: BRES
- Industry: real estate
- Founded: 2005
- Headquarters: Doha, Qatar
- Services: financial services
- Total assets: QAR 66 billion (Dec 2011)
- Parent: Qatar Investment Authority (45%)
- Website: www.barwa.com.qa

Barwa Group (QE: BRES) is a real estate company based in Doha, Qatar. Established in 2005, it is listed on the Qatar Exchange, with 45% of its shares held by the Qatar Investment Authority, via its Qatari Diar subsidiary. It is primarily active in real estate development and related financial services. It is Qatar's largest real estate group. It is chaired by Salah bin Ghanim Al Ali.

== Projects ==
=== Mesaieed ===
In 2012, Barwa Group launched a construction project in the southern zone of Mesaieed to establish a large tourist resort over an area of 829 square metres (8,920 sq ft).

=== Mesaimeer ===
In February 2009, a development project was launched in Mesaimeer, a district of Al Rayyan by Barwa Group. Entailed in the project are 1,000-capacity residential housing units, a supermarket, a nursery, and a mosque; all within a gated compound.

=== Barwa Al Baraha ===
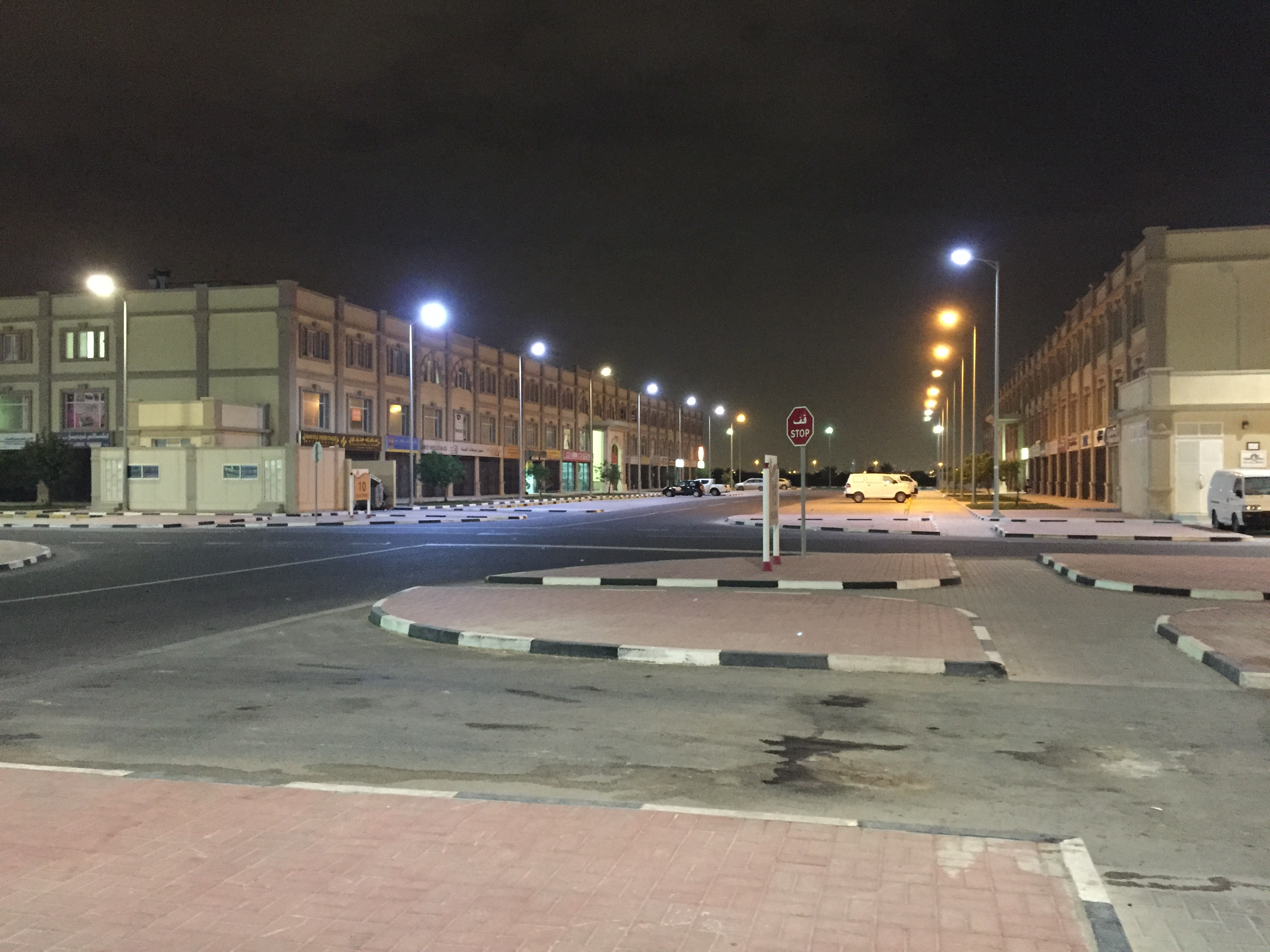
Barwa Al Baraha at night.

Barwa Group launched a project to construct Barwa Al Baraha, a city designed for laborers, in the Al Wakrah (municipality) at a budget of around $1.1 billion. The project was completed in 2010.

=== Madinat Al Mawater ===
The Madinat Al Mawater project is located close to Rawdat Rashid area and Salwa Road. The project holds built-up area of around 167,072 square meters, which includes apartments, used-car lots, shops and workshops. The completion of phase one of the project was announced in March 2017.

=== Barwa City ===
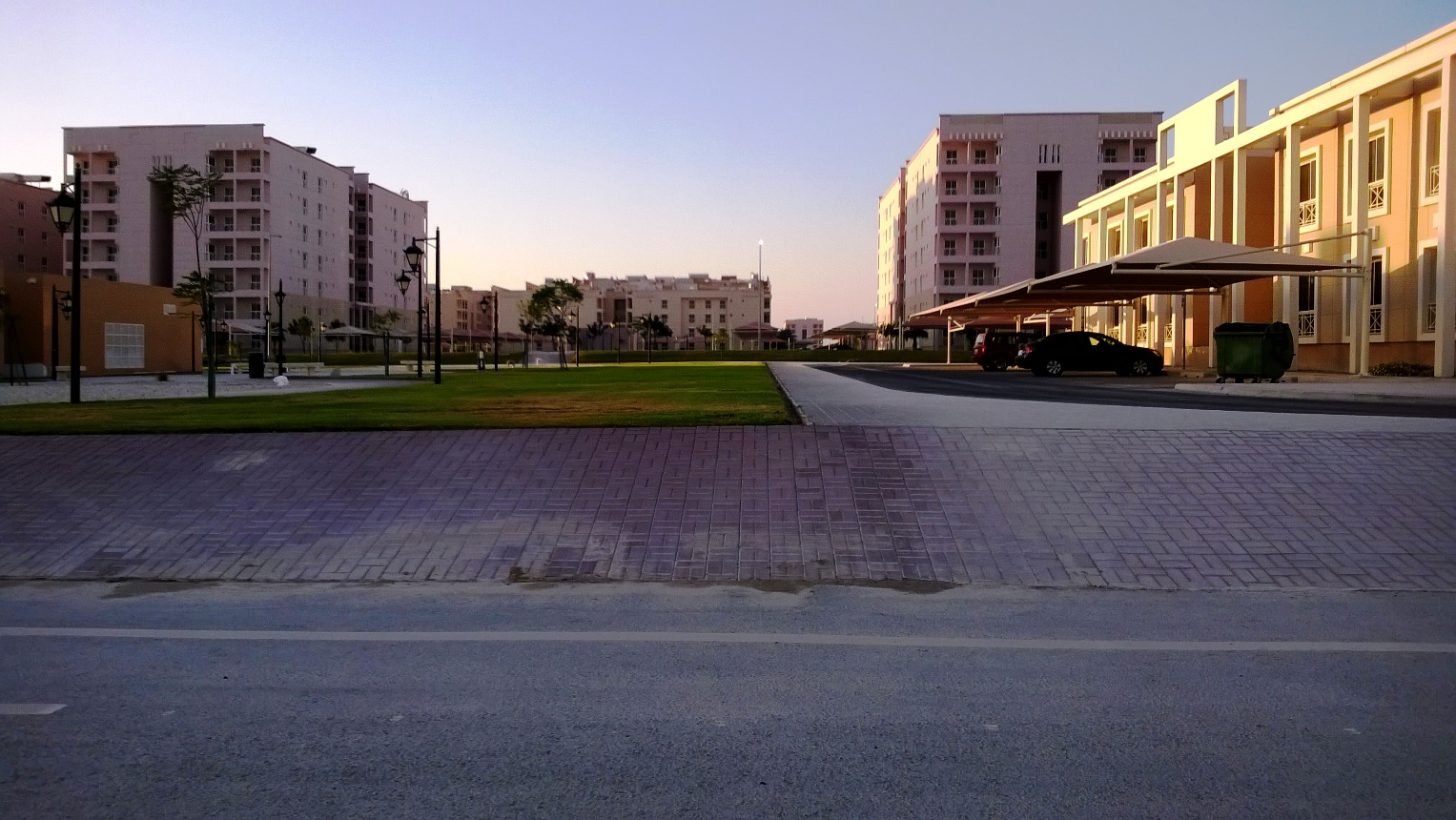
Barwa City in 2013

Situated between Mesaimeer and Abu Hamour, it received its first occupants in 2012. Barwa City contains 6,968 housing units spread across 128 buildings, and covers an area of 1.35 million sq meters. It contains multiple amenities including schools, parks and mosques. Barwa City was sold to Qatari Diar in 2014. Barwa City was hit by a missile during the US-Iran conflict in 2026.

=== Other ===
Barwa has been a sponsor of the Spanish motorsport Addax Team.
