= Zone 81, Qatar =

Zone 81
- Zone
- Interactive map of Zone 81
- Coordinates: 25.127444°N 51.311402°E
- Country: Qatar
- Municipality: Al Rayyan
- Blocks: 48

Area
  - Total: 160.5 km^{2} (62.0 sq mi)

Population
  - Total: 12,483 (2,015)
- Time zone: UTC+03 (Arabia Standard Time)
- ISO 3166 code: QA-RA

Zone 81 is a zone of the municipality of Al Rayyan in Qatar. The main district recorded in the 2015 population census was Mebaireek.

Other districts which fall within its administrative boundaries are Al Hemaila, Al Khaldiya, Al Mukaynis, and Ummahat Owaina.

== Demographics ==
As of the 2010 census, the zone comprised 1,002 housing units and 145 establishments. There were 11,333 people living in the zone, of which 50% were male and 50% were female. Out of the 11,333 inhabitants, 62% were 20 years of age or older and 38% were under the age of 20.

Employed persons made up 40% of the total population. Females accounted for 46% of the working population, while males accounted for 54% of the working population.

| Year | Population |
|---|---|
| 1986 | 347 |
| 1997 | 1,465 |
| 2004 | 6,287 |
| 2010 | 11,333 |
| 2015 | 12,483 |

== Land use ==
The Ministry of Municipality and Environment (MME) breaks down land use in the zone as follows.

| Area (km^{2}) | Developed land (km^{2}) | Undeveloped land (km^{2}) | Residential (km^{2}) | Commercial/ Industrial (km^{2}) | Education/ Health (km^{2}) | Farming/ Green areas (km^{2}) | Other uses (km^{2}) |
|---|---|---|---|---|---|---|---|
| 160.48 | 77.70 | 82.78 | 2.33 | 4.28 | 0.54 | 2.52 | 68.03 |
