= Hamad Bin Khalifa Bin Ahmed Al-Thani =

His Excellency Hamad bin Khalifa bin Ahmed Al-Thani
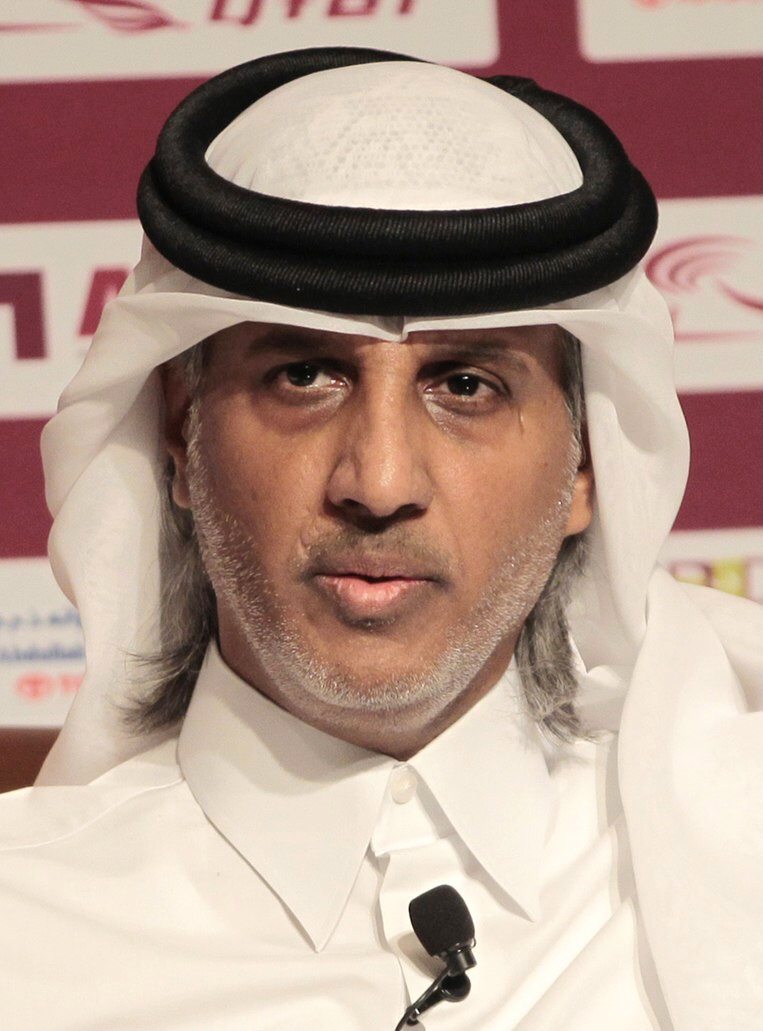
- Al-Thani in 2011

President of the Qatar Football Association
- In office 2005–2023
- Succeeded by: Jassim Rashid Al Buenain

Minister of Sports and Youth
- Incumbent
- Assumed office 8 January 2024
- Monarch: Tamim bin Hamad Al Thani
- Prime Minister: Mohammed bin Abdulrahman Al Thani
- Preceded by: Salah bin Ghanim Al Ali

Personal details
- Born: 8 September 1968 (age 57) Doha, Qatar
- Education: Qatar University (B)
- Occupation: FIFA member, Football administrator

Sheikh Hamad bin Khalifa bin Ahmed Al-Thani is a Qatari football administrator, coach, member in the FIFA Council and AFC Professional Football Committee. He was the president of the Qatar Football Association (QFA) from 2005 to 2023. On 8 January 2024, Sheikh Hamad bin Khalifa bin Ahmed Al-Thani was appointed as Minister of Sports and Youth.

== Education and career ==
Al-Thani earned his BA from the Qatar University in Physical Education.

Al-Thani is president of the Arab Gulf Cup Football Federation, and was president of the Qatar Football Association from 2005 to 2023. Prior to being president he was the vice president of the QFA. He serves as the Chairman of the Local Organizing Committee of the 2023 AFC Asian Cup and also as member of the Supreme Committee for Delivery & Legacy, Qatar. On 8 January 2024 HE Sheikh Hamad bin Khalifa bin Ahmed Al-Thani appointed as Minister of Sports and Youth.
