= Jassim Rashid Al Buenain =

Qatari football administrator

HE Jassim Rashid Al Buenain

President of the Qatar Football Association
- Incumbent
- Assumed office June 2023
- Preceded by: Hamad Bin Khalifa Bin Ahmed Al-Thani

Personal details
- Education: Qatar University
- Alma mater: Qatar University (B); Plymouth University (MBA)
- Occupation: Football administrator

Jassim Rashid Al Buenain is a Qatari football administrator, secretary general of the Qatar Olympic Committee (QOC) and vice-president of the Olympic Council of Asia (OCA). Since June 2023, he has been the president of the Qatar Football Association (QFA).

== Education and career ==
Al Buenain attended Ibn Taymiyyah high school where he graduated in 2000. In 2004, he earned a bachelor's degree in administrative science and economics from Qatar University. He also earned an Executive MBA from Plymouth University in 2016.

Since October 2017, Al Buenain has been chairman of the Qatar Olympic Academy (QOA) and secretary general of the Qatar Olympic Committee. He has been vice-president of the Olympic Council of Asia since January 2021. In June 2023, he was elected as new president of the Qatar Football Association, succeeding Hamad Bin Khalifa Bin Ahmed Al-Thani who held the position since 2005.

=== Career as player ===
Al Buenain was a member of Qatar SC from 2000 to 2012. From 2002 to 2005, he played for the Qatar national football team.
