= Dahl Al Misfir =

Cavern in central Qatar

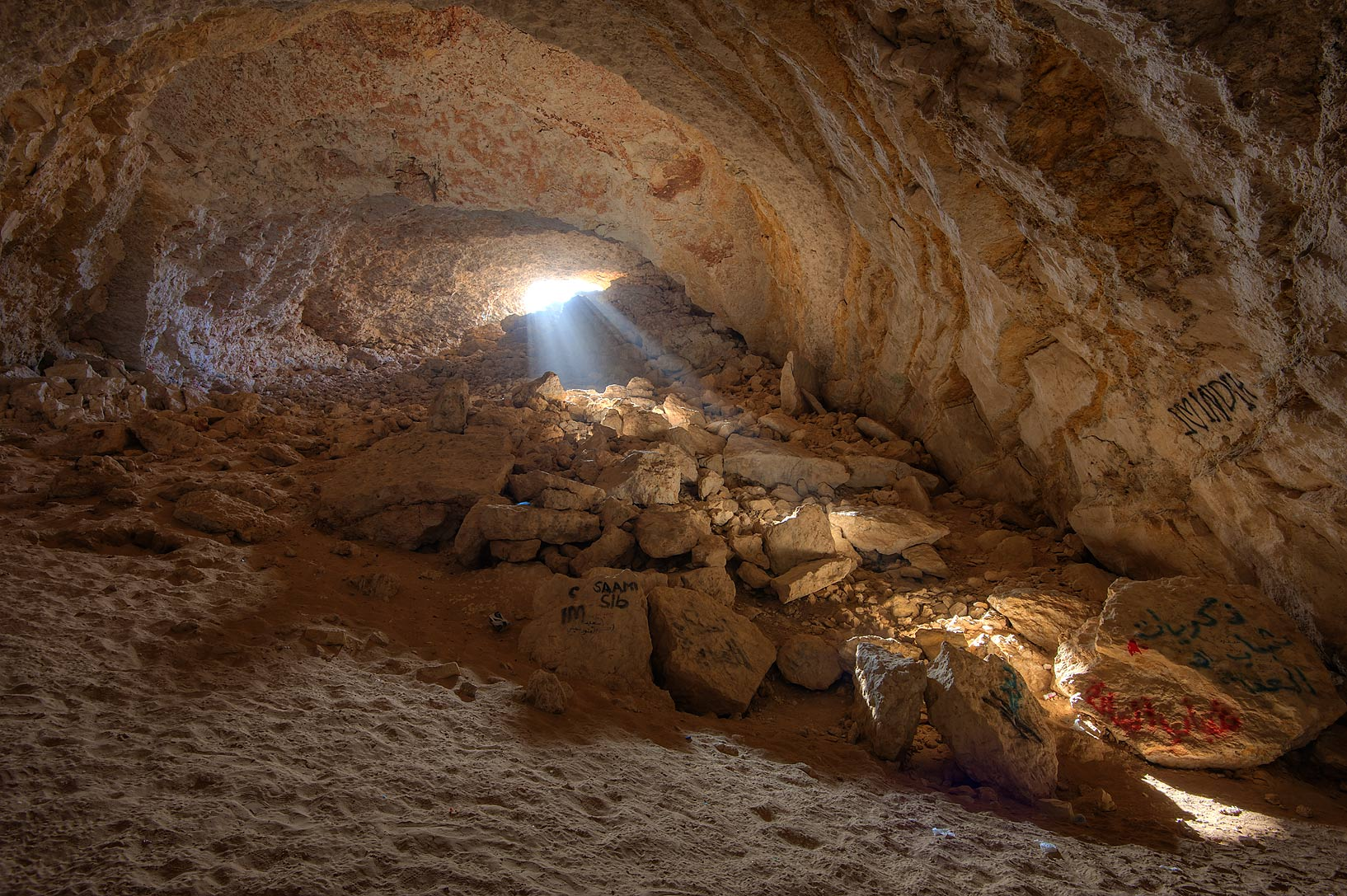
Dahl Al Misfir Cave

Dahl Al Misfir is a cavern that is a natural landmark located near Rawdat Rashid in central Qatar, approximately 40 kilometres (25 mi) southwest of Doha.

== Description ==
The cave contains fibrous gypsum crystals, which gives its interior a faint phosphorescent glow. Its depth is anywhere from 40 meters to at least 100 meters. The entrance is approximately 12 x 4.5 meters and its gypsum crystals derive from the Lower Dammam Formation and Rus Formation.

Its exact age is unknown, but sediment analysis suggests it is younger than the surrounding Eocene limestone formations, estimated to be between 40 and 50 million years old.

== Tourism ==
The site is fenced off but non-ticketed and open to the public. It has emerged as a popular destination for nature enthusiasts and families, particularly during national holidays.

In November 2022, the Ministry of Environment and Climate Change (MECC), in cooperation with Qatar Museums and ExxonMobil Research Qatar, reopened the site following the first comprehensive geological survey of the cave. The rehabilitation project included the installation of safe access paths, protective barriers, shaded rest areas, and an educational signboard with a cave map accessible via QR code.

== See also ==
- Natural areas of Qatar
