= Zone 83, Qatar =

Zone 83
- Zone
- Interactive map of Zone 83
- Coordinates: 25.054248°N 51.015570°E
- Country: Qatar
- Municipality: Al Rayyan
- Blocks: 36

Area
  - Total: 554.3 km^{2} (214.0 sq mi)

Population
  - Total: 2,614 (2,015)
- Time zone: UTC+03 (Arabia Standard Time)
- ISO 3166 code: QA-RA

Zone 83 is a zone of the municipality of Al Rayyan in Qatar. The main district recorded in the 2015 population census was Al Karaana.

Other districts within the municipality's administrative boundaries are Al Rekayya, Baida Al Gaa, Jariyan Al Batnah, Jaww Basheer, and Umm Al Suwab.

== Demographics ==
As of the 2010 census, the zone comprised 177 housing units and 95 establishments. There were 1,567 people living in the zone, of which 87% were male and 13% were female. Out of the 1,567 inhabitants, 87% were 20 years of age or older and 13% were under the age of 20. The literacy rate was 93.7%.

Employed persons made up 84% of the total population. Females accounted for 6% of the working population, while males accounted for 94% of the working population.

Year	Population
1986	744
1997	1,031
2004	1,072
2010	1,567
2015	2,614

== Land use ==
The Ministry of Municipality and Environment's breakdown of land use in the zone is as follows.

Area (km^{2})	Developed land (km^{2})	Undeveloped land (km^{2})	Residential (km^{2})	Commercial/ Industrial (km^{2})	Education/ Health (km^{2})	Farming/ Green areas (km^{2})	Other uses (km^{2})
554.33	104.26	450.07	0.20	0.22	0.02	31.79	72.03
