= Jariyan Al Batnah =

Jariyan Al Batnah جريان الباطنة
- Village
- Location within Qatar
- Coordinates: 25.107241°N 51.154251°E
- Country: Qatar
- Municipality: Al Rayyan
- Zone: Zone 83
- District no.: 521

Area
  - Total: 4.4 km^{2} (1.7 sq mi)

Jariyan Al Batnah (Arabic: جريان الباطنة, romanized: Jarayān al Baţnah; also spelled Jariyan Al Butna) is a village and former municipality of Qatar. Its territory was split between the municipalities of Al Wakrah and Al Rayyan in 2004. All of Jariyan Al Batnah's districts recorded in the 2004 census – Al Karaana, Rawdat Rashed, Sawda Natheel, and Abu Samra – were distributed to the municipality of Al Rayyan thereafter. The village of Jariyan Al Batnah was also shifted to within Al Rayyan's boundaries, in Zone 83.

The Persian Gulf bordered Jariyan Al Batnah in its west and its southeast. It used to be the only municipality to border foreign territory: Saudi Arabia's Ash Sharqiyah province.

== Etymology ==
The word jariyān is the plural of jerī, which itself is derived from the Arabic word qarī, meaning a place where water flows freely and which accommodates a variety of plant life. Baṭnah originates from the local term baṭn, which translates to "inside of". This name was given on account of the village's location in a depression surrounded by jerīs.

== History ==
In 1986, the Ministry of Municipal Affairs opened a municipal office in Jariyan Al Batnah.

== As a municipality ==
Jariyan Al Batnah جريان الباطنة
- Municipality
- Map of Qatar with Jariyan Al Batnah Municipality highlighted
- Country: Qatar

Area
  - Total: 3,906 km^{2} (1,508 sq mi)

Population (2004)
  - Total: 6,308
  - Density: 1.615/km^{2} (4.183/sq mi)
- Time zone: UTC+03 (East Africa Time)
- ISO 3166 code: QA-JB

The following table shows the population of Jariyan Al Batnah.

Jariyan Al Batnah Population
March 2004	March 1997	March 1986
6,678	4,521	2,727

The following table shows the registered live births by nationality and sex for this municipality. Place of births is based on home municipality of mother at birth.

Registered live births by nationality and sex
Year	Qatari Male	Qatari Female	Total Qatari	Non Qatari Male	Non Qatari Female	Total Non Qatar	Total Male	Total Female	Grand Total
2001	18	15	33	5	3	8	23	18	41
2002	59	63	122	4	4	8	63	67	130
2003	18	16	34	4	6	10	22	22	44
2004	16	24	40	4	0	4	20	24	44
2005	28	25	53	7	3	10	35	28	63
2006	20	32	52	4	1	5	24	33	57
2007	25	22	47	6	1	7	31	23	54
