= Al Hemaila =

Al Hemaila الحميلة
- District
- Location within Qatar
- Coordinates: 25.1700°N 51.3984°E
- Country: Qatar
- Municipality: Al Rayyan
- Zone no.: Zone 81
- District no.: 474

Area
  - Total: 6.2 km^{2} (2.4 sq mi)

Al Hemaila (Arabic: الحميلة, romanized: Al Ḩumaylah) is a district in Qatar, located in the municipality of Al Rayyan.

It is bordered by Bul Yuwabi to the south-east, the New Industrial Area to the east, Mebaireek to the north, Jery Al Tuweela to the west, and Al Udeid Air Base to the south-west.

Al Hemaila Medical Centre opened in 2016 to serve inhabitants of the Industrial Area. With 11 general clinics and various specialized clinics, the medical centre can service upwards of 24,000 patients per month. It is operated by the Qatar Red Crescent Society.

== Etymology ==
The district's name is derived from the Arabic term hamala, meaning "to carry". This name emerged from the area's topography. Since the region is made up of three distinct elevations, the surface on the two highest levels appear as if it is being carried (i.e. supported) by their subordinate level.
