= Abu Nakhla =

Abu Nakhla أبو نخلة
- Village
- Location within Qatar
- Coordinates: 25°09′00″N 51°20′00″E
- Country: Qatar
- Municipality: Al-Shahaniya
- Zone: Zone 82

Abu Nakhla (Arabic: أبو نخلة, romanized: Abū Nakhlah) is a district in Qatar, located in the municipality of Al-Shahaniya. Previously a village of some importance stood here, but by the 21st century was largely depopulated. It was recorded as a stand-alone district in zone no. 81 with Al Mukaynis in the 2004 census, but both districts lost their census designations to Mebaireek. In 2014, Abu Nakhla was moved from Al Rayyan Municipality to the newly created Al-Shahaniya Municipality.

A hospital managed by the Hamad Medical Corporation is based here to meet the health needs for workers of the nearby Doha Industrial Area.

== Etymology ==
Abu is the Arabic word for "father" and is used to denote a geographical feature. The second element, nakhla, is a local term for a palm tree, chosen in reference to a lone palm tree that once stood in the area.

== Geography ==
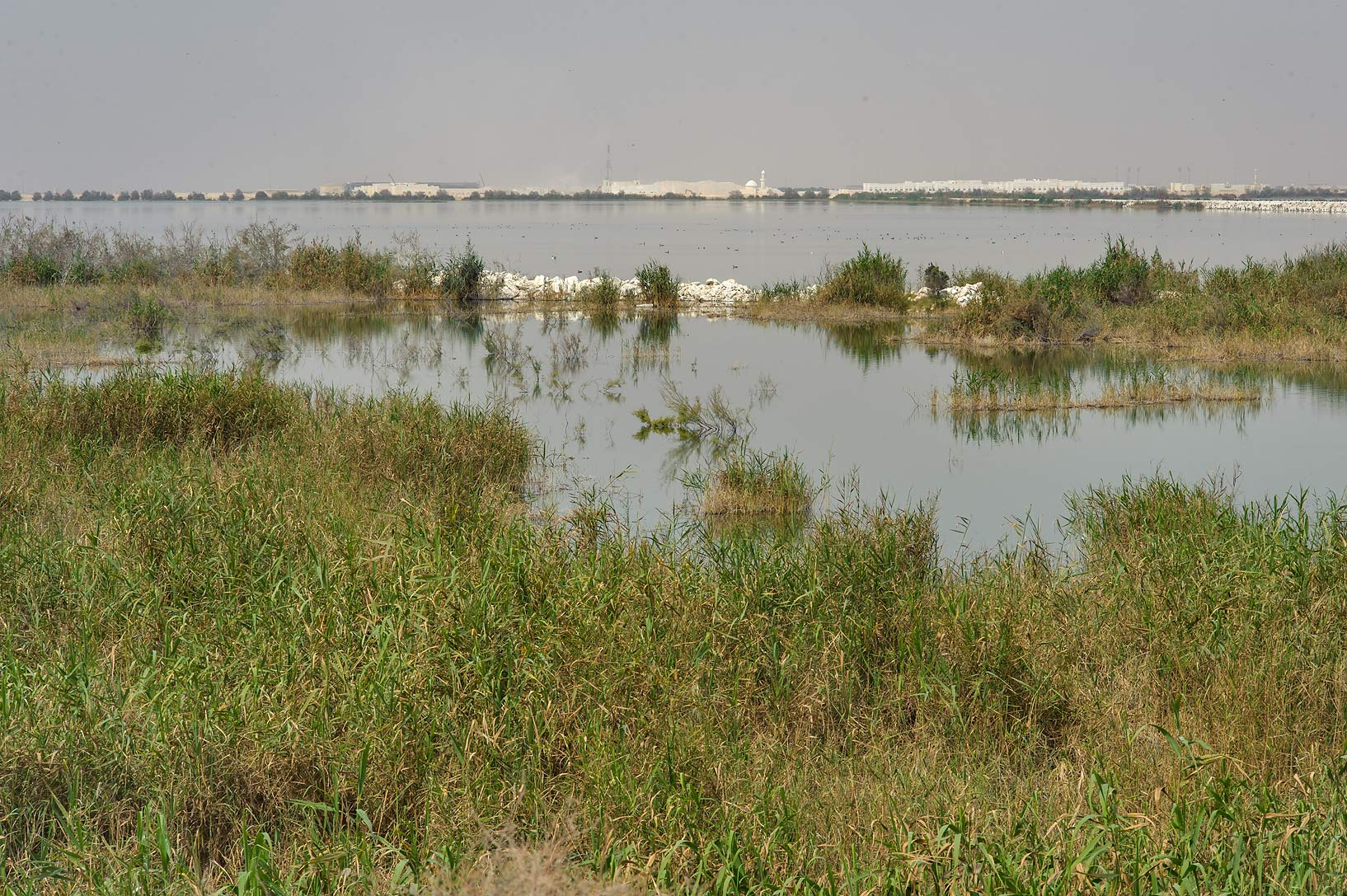
Reeds (Phragmites australis) in Abu Nakhla Pond

Situated in central Qatar about 15 kilometres (9.3 mi) away from the capital Doha, the district straddles the border of Al Rayyan Municipality and Al-Shahaniya Municipality.

Abu Nakhla forms part of the western boundary of the southern desert region, which occupies 34.7% of Qatar's total area. Of the four sub-regions of the southern desert, Abu Nakhla is a part of the trapezoidal-shaped hamada sub-group, which has its eastern boundary at Mesaieed, the water pipeline running between the two demarcating the base of this zone. The area around Abu Nakhla is characterized by its rocky surface terrain (hamada), which is distinct from the sand dunes area further south. The surface is covered by a mosaic of closely packed pebbles and rock fragments or, in some places, by a thin layer of indurated mineral deposits forming a hard crust.

=== Abu Nakhla Pond ===
Since 1985, sewage effluent from Doha has been dumped in a depression (rawda) in Abu Nakhla. Combined with gradual and continuous rainfall during the rainy season, the depression has morphed into a 2 to 3 km pond. Locals have long complained about negative environmental and health effects resulting from the pond, including increased pest populations, foul odors and seepage into aquifers. There is also a strong perception that the sewage water is untreated, and could pose a health hazard. From 2014 to 2015, a study was carried out on the area to investigate potential environmental hazards posed by the pond.

The study revealed that, in regards to lithology, the rocks of the pond comprised two members of the Eocene-period Dammam Formation: the Simsima/Umm Bab Member and the Midra Shale Member. The former member is known for its shallow aquifer, as well as for its weak structure and frequent crevices and fissures, which make it susceptible to contamination by sewage leakage from the pond. Of the water quality, the pond was found to contain low amounts of bacterial contaminants due to Qatar's use of sophisticated filtration techniques. Concentrations of heavy metals were also found to be within acceptable ranges.

Various species of wildlife currently reside in and around the pond, including frogs, fish, and at least 260 bird species. Approximately 150 greater flamingos have been recorded in the area. Plant life is also abundant here; approximately 10% of Qatar's documented plant species are represented here.

Common vegetation found around the pond include cat's tail (Typha domingensis) and reeds (Phragmites australis).

== Attractions ==
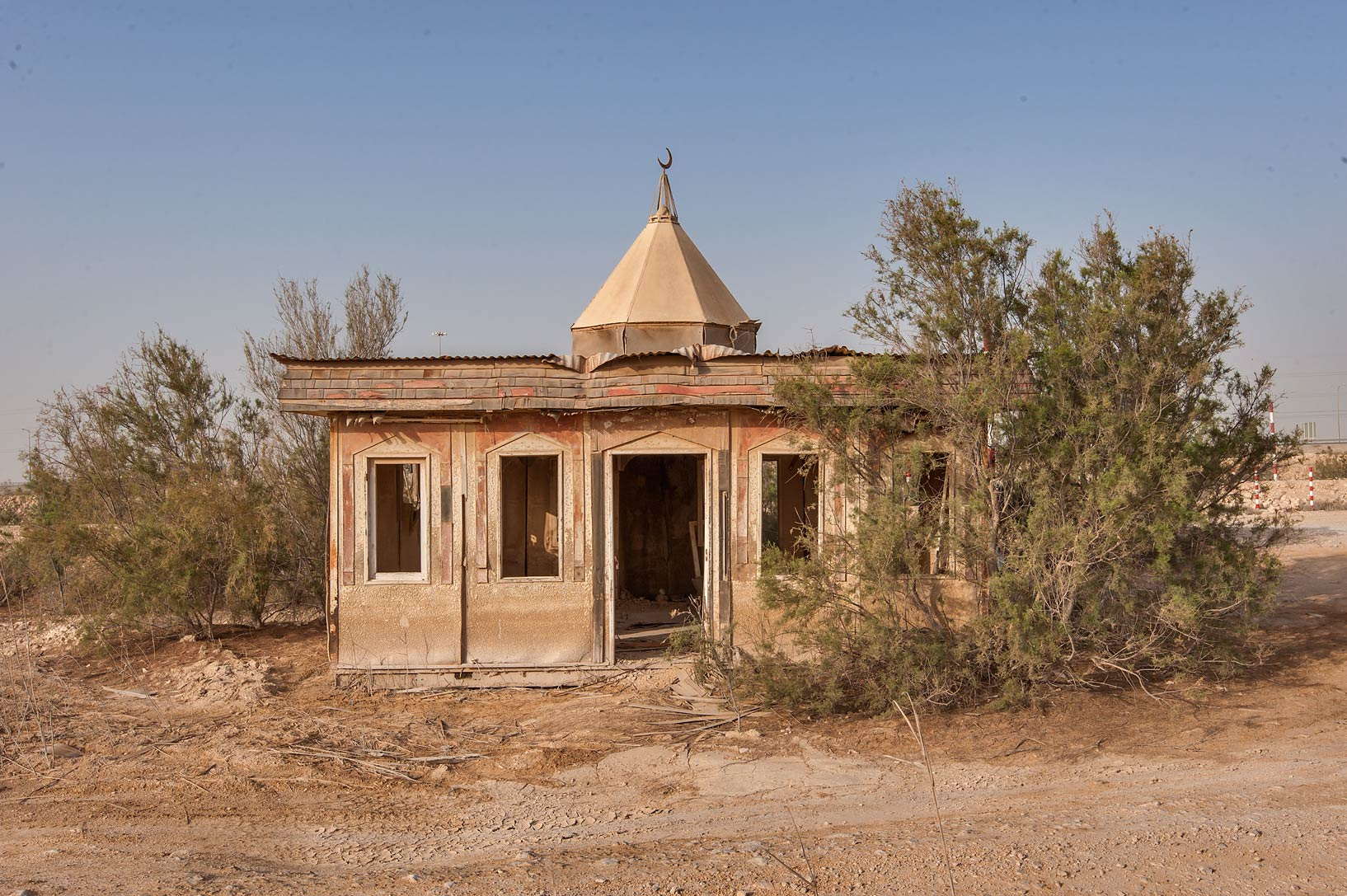
Dilapidated mosque near the water reservoirs in Abu Nakhla.

Qatar's first water park was opened in Abu Nakhla in October 2010. Cypriot company Aqua Masters was responsible for the park's planning and development while Kuwaiti Al Jazeera Entertainment Enterprises Company oversees its operation. Spread out over a 50,000 m^{2} area, the park can accommodate up to 3,000 visitors at a time. A 300,000 m^{2} tourist resort is under development next to the park.

== Agriculture ==
As part of the Ministry of Municipality and Environment's Al Azab program to help improve the healthcare for livestock, it was announced in 2019 that a modern veterinary clinic is planned for the district.

== Water reservoir ==
Abu Nakhla is one of five sites for the government-sponsored project to develop reservoirs in the country. Once completed, the reservoirs are expected to be the largest in the world in their category, with a total length of 650 km and constructed at a cost of QR 14.5 billion. In June 2018, the first phase of the project was completed.
