= Qatar Primary Materials Company =

Qatari materials development and management company

- Founded: 2006
- Founder: Government of Qatar
- Website: Official website

Qatar Primary Materials Company (QPMC) / AL-Awalia (Arabic: شركة قطر للموارد الأولية), is a Qatari company that specializes in establishing and developing sources of raw materials, focuses on the efficiencies of material handling operations, and provides a strategic reserve of primary materials. The firm has seen some controversy, especially with respect to its leadership, environmental impact, and work-related accidents.

== Background ==
QPMC was founded in 2006 by instruction of the Government of Qatar through an Emri decree to provide efficient port service at the gabbro berths, as well as developing them to increase their capacity and ability to manage larger quantities of raw materials imported to facilitate trade.

Additionally, the Qatari government wanted to ensure domestic market supply of building materials, provide consistent reserves of primary materials, stabilize their prices using the First in First Out (FIFO) method, secure the country's strategic stockpile, and ease the government's involvement in facilitating revitalization and building processes to encourage and support affordable conditions for the private sector to flourish and be competitive in the region.

== Market ==
QPMC has aimed to create a competitive environment, limit monopolies and boost industry transparency by making sure the local market receives a consistent supply of building materials and improve the efficiency of port facilities that are used in the import of bulk construction materials. The company maintains reserves in dune sand, gabbro, washed sand, and limestone, and has supplied about 40,000 cubic meters of dune sand to the market. Furthermore, the company is involved in operations through its capacity to develop and operate jetties for Government projects, construct cement, develop sea logistics supply chain, and offering solutions for the transport, storage, and delivery of primary materials in Qatar.

== Leadership ==
The founding chairman and managing director of the QPMC was Khalid bin Mohammed al-Rabban. Al-Rabban has been associated to terrorist organizations and terror financing.

He was the President and board member of Alkarama foundation, a Swiss-based organization which poses as a human rights advocacy group. In actuality, Alkarama is a front for political Islamist networks. Two of the organization's founding members Abd al-Rahman bin Umayr al-Nuaymi and Abdul Wahab al-Humaiqani are on the U.S. Department of Treasury’s sanctions list for their work as a major al-Qaeda financiers and representatives in the Arabian Peninsula through their transferring of millions of dollars in funding, and are Specially Designated Global Terrorists. In addition, Alkarama has represented clients associated with Islamist militants operating in Syria.

Al-Rabban is also a member of the Global Anti-Aggression Campaign led by a close mentor of Osama bin Laden, Safar bin Abdul Rahman al-Hawali. The campaign also features al-Nuyami as a member and has supported Hamas leadership and Hamas members’ in their quest for jihad.

Currently, General Engineer Abdul Aziz Abdullah Al-Ansari is QPMC's chairman after his work with Qatar's Ministry of Interior.

== Current standing ==
QPMC has refocused its strategy to work with contractors and private sector firms. In its efforts to supply raw materials for the construction industry, the company has signed five agreements in 2015 with private firms to deliver primary construction materials, mainly gabbro and limestone, to the Qatari market. The Doha Quarry and Oryx Trading were instrumental in these agreements through its commitment to provide the materials in large quantities.

As of end of year 2015, the company has been able to sign over 24 supply agreements with local contractors, supplying them with over 19 million tons of materials, thanks to its last 4 signed agreements. One of QPMC's biggest customers is Ashghal, the Public Works Authority, through an agreement to supply it with over 90 million tons of gabbro and limestone for 5 years. This agreement has created a framework for Qatar's infrastructural development. QPMC has also signed a 5-year $500 million Contract of Affreightment with Hyundi Glovis in 2015 in their South Korea headquarters to ship 50 million tons of aggregates to Qatar. This contract will require the shipments of aggregates from the United Arab Emirates and Oman to Qatar throughout the 5-year contract. These efforts have come at an instrumental time for Qatar in its efforts to prepare for the 2022 FIFA World Cup by building stadiums and developing infrastructure in the country.

== Challenges ==
In addition to its tainted leadership, QPMC faces a number of environmental challenges. The company has struggled to keep its carbon footprint levels low. Additionally, the firm has faced a number of operational challenges in the aggregate supply chain, especially with regard to occupational hazards and harmful work-zone accidents that have occurred under its watch.
