= Umm Al Zubar East =

Umm Al Zubar East أم الزبار الشرقية
- Village
- Location in Qatar
- Coordinates: 25°10′26″N 51°16′10″E
- Country: Qatar
- Municipality: Al-Shahaniya
- Zone: Zone 82
- District no.: 487

Area
  - Total: 6.9 sq mi (17.8 km^{2})
- Elevation: 138 ft (42 m)

Umm Al Zubar East (Arabic: أم الزبار الشرقية, romanized: Umm az Zubār ash Sharqīyah; also known as Umm Al Zubar Al Sharqiya) is a village in Qatar located in the municipality of Al-Shahaniya. Hundreds of people live in the village.

== Etymology ==
In Arabic, umm is translated to "mother", and is a common prefix attached to a name in order to signify a geographical feature. The landscape is typified by small mounds, which is what the Arabic term zubar refers to. The "east" (or sharqiya) portion of its name was given due to it being east of the rawda (depression) from which it derives its name, Umm Al Zubar, and also so that it could be differentiated from a larger village lying to the immediate west called Umm Al Zubar Al Qibliya.

== Geography ==
It is situated closely to the districts of Al Sailiya and Mebaireek in Al Rayyan Municipality.

== Infrastructure ==
Poor infrastructure is an issue in the village. The electric system is reported to be unreliable and outdated, and there is a lack of sanitation services, facilities and roads.

The closest paved road to the village is the Rawdat Rashed Road, which is also known as the "road of death" due to the high number of accidents that occur on it. This road separates Umm Al Zubar East from its neighbor to the west, Umm Al Zubar Al Qibliya. Streets in the village lack substantial lighting.

In 2012, the Public Works Authority carried out infrastructure and street projects over a 1.07 square km area for the village, as well as creating an access road.
