= Rawdat Rashed =

Rawdat Rashed روضة راشد
- Village
- Location within Qatar
- Coordinates: 25°19′10″N 51°21′12″E
- Country: Qatar
- Municipality: Al-Shahaniya
- Zone: Zone 82
- District no.: 492

Area
  - Total: 32.2 km^{2} (12.4 sq mi)

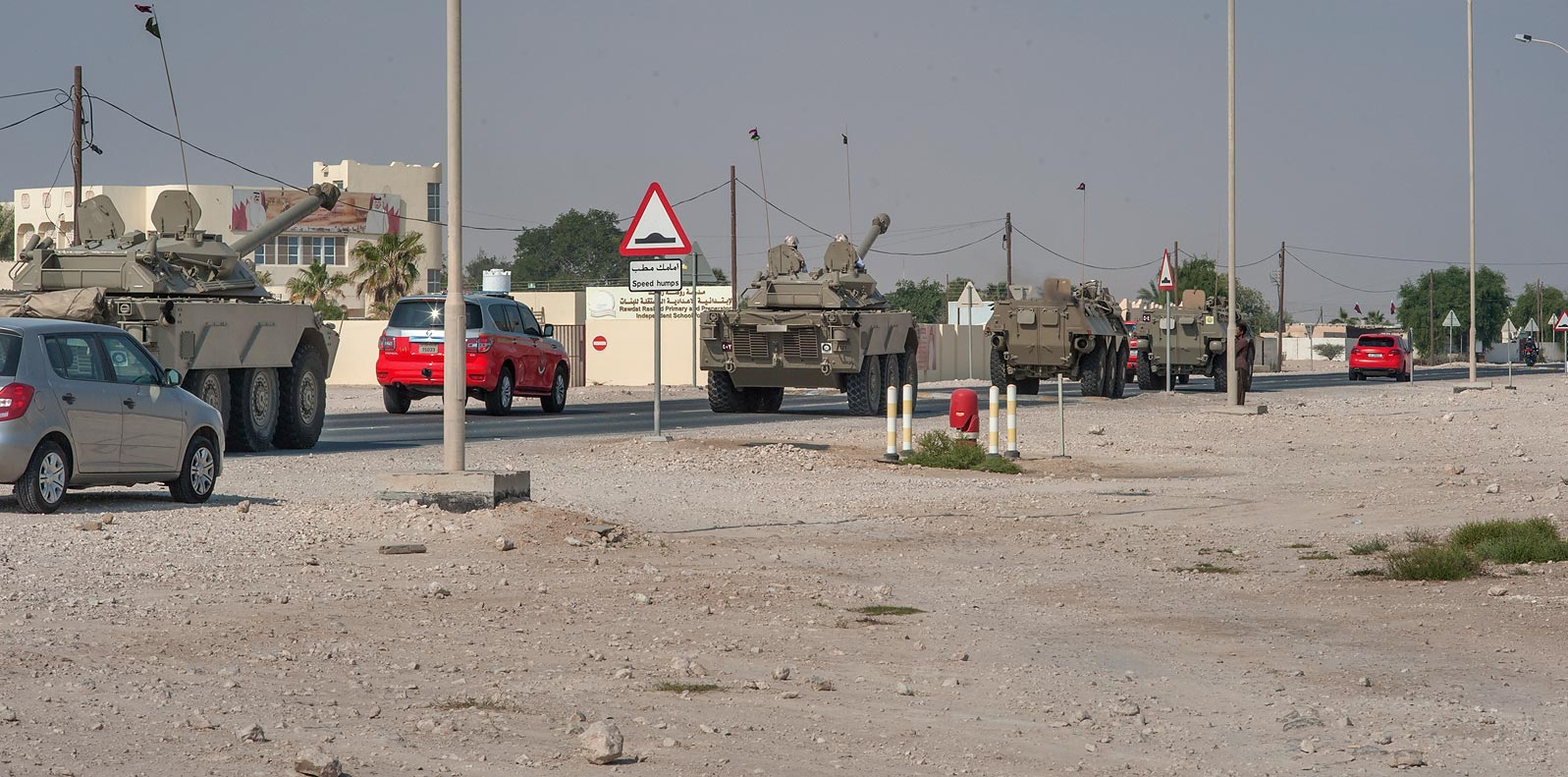
Military convoy near Rawdat Rashed Primary & Preparatory Independent School for Boys.

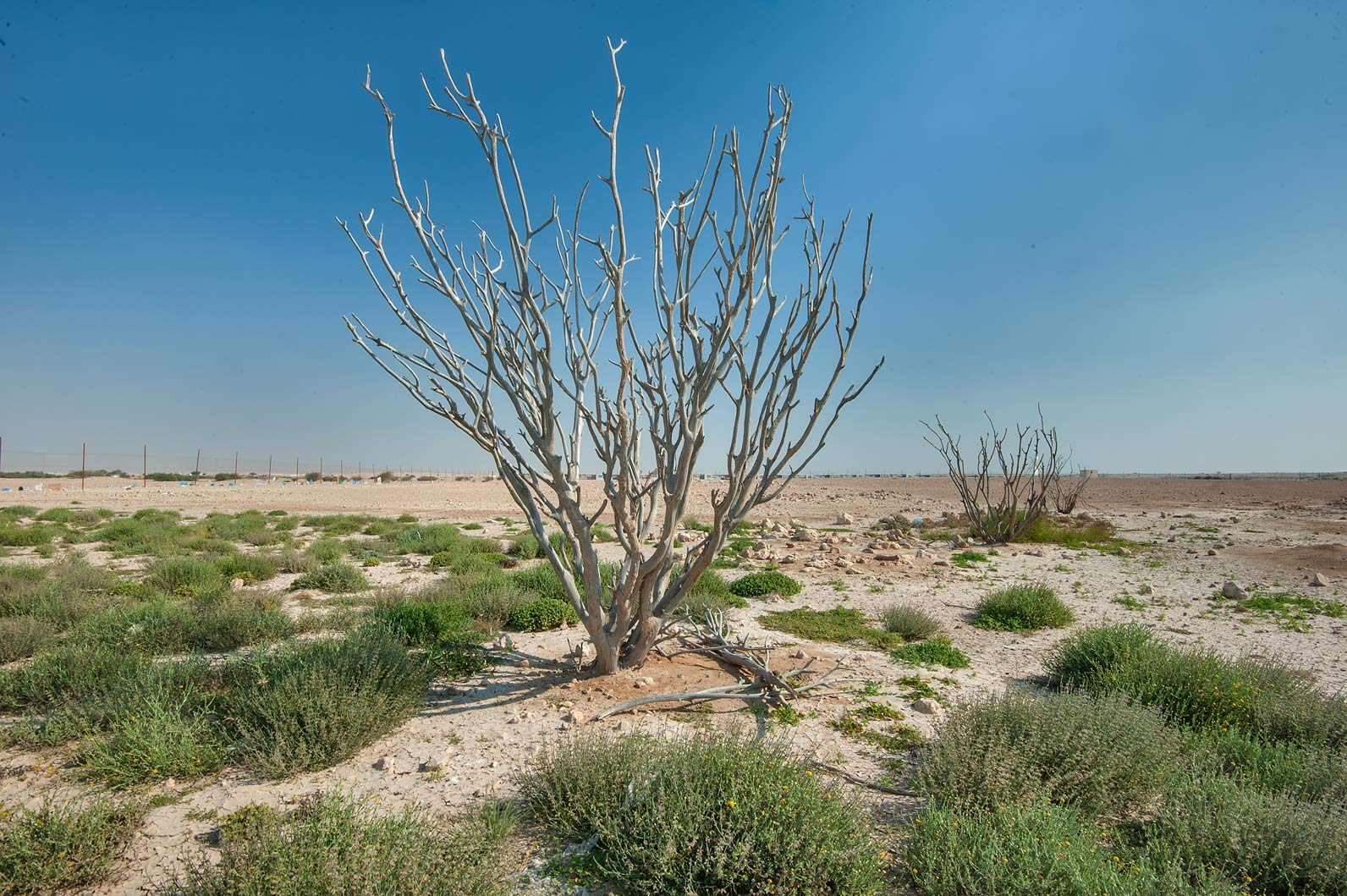
Vegetation in a roadside depression in Rawdat Rashed.

Rawdat Rashed (Arabic: روضة راشد, romanized: Rawḑat Rāshid) is a village in Qatar, located in the municipality of Al-Shahaniya. It was demarcated in 1988. The Dahl Al Misfir cave is located to its south.

Located in central Qatar, approximately 45 kilometres (28 mi) from the capital Doha, the village was once considerably larger but lost much of its population during government efforts to resettle rural inhabitants in Doha in the mid-to-late 20th century. The surrounding region is extremely arid and, thus, was historically sparsely populated. Previously, it was accessible only through unpaved desert roads.

== Etymology ==
In Arabic, rawda refers to a natural depression where rainfall runoff accumulates. The second part of the name, Rashed, commemorates a man of that name who died in the rawda.

== Geography ==
Rawdat Rashed is situated in central Qatar. The villages of Wadi Al Jamal Al Shamali and Umm Wishah are nearby. It used to be part of the Jariyan Al Batnah municipality before it was incorporated into Al Rayyan in 2004. In 2014, it was incorporated into the newly created Al-Shahaniya Municipality.

=== Madinat Al Mawater ===
Barwa Group launched a planned community named Madinat Al Mawater (literally 'Motor City') on the outskirts of Rawdat Rashed, near the junction of Rawdat Rashed Road–Salwa Road. The community will host residential units, workshops, car showrooms, and apartment complexes.

=== Dahl Al Misfir ===
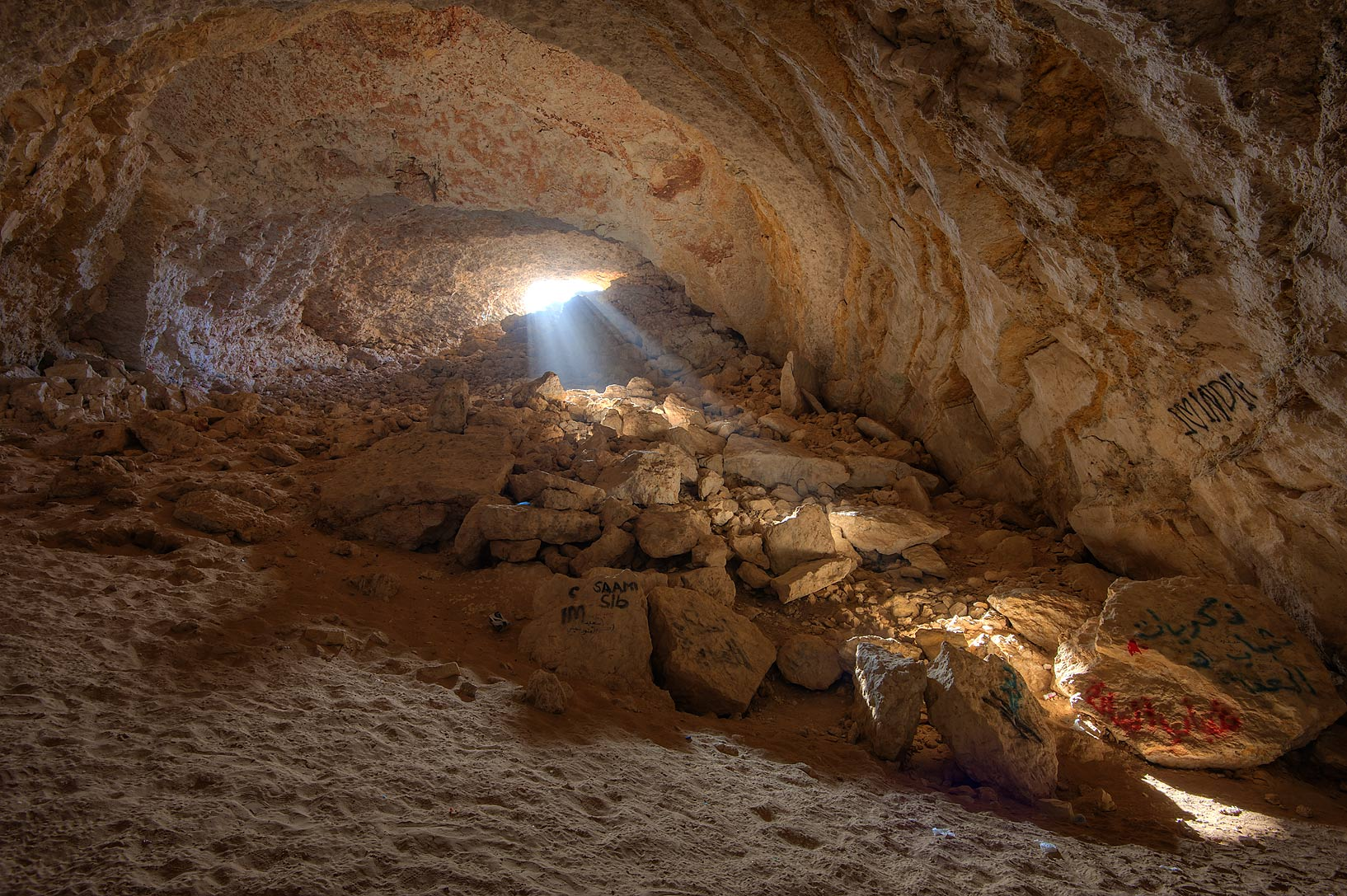
Dahl Al Misfir Cave

Located to the immediate south of Rawdat Rashed, Dahl Al Misfir is one of Qatar's most prominent natural attractions. The cave extends to a depth of roughly 40 metres (130 ft) and is composed of fibrous gypsum, giving its interior a faint phosphorescent glow. The site is fenced off but non-ticketed and open to the public.

=== Wildlife ===
A nearby area known as Rawdat Al Ghafat, located adjacent to Rawdat Rashed, hosts one of the country's only stands of the ghaf tree (Prosopis cineraria). This site contained eight mature individuals as of 2005, some estimated to be over 100 years old and more than 12 metres (39 ft) in height. The site was recognized as ecologically significant due to the presence of relic vegetation in a small depression where the trees survived despite pressures from grazing and land degradation.

In response to the risk of local extinction, the Ministry of Municipality and Environment launched a conservation project beginning in 2018, planting approximately 150 saplings of ghaf and other native species such as samar (Vachellia tortilis) and salam (Vachellia flava). Further afforestation efforts were undertaken in 2020 as part of the National Land Rehabilitation Project, during which 500 wild seedlings were planted at Rawdat Rashed and adjoining areas. The conservation area was fenced off to protect it from grazing and it was integrated into the Qatari Ghaf Protection Project.

== Industry ==
=== Water resources ===
The area contains the most substantial supply of fresh groundwater in the southern zone of the country. A government wellfield is found in the area, and was previously used as a water source for Umm Bab's cement industry.

Rawdat Rashed is also one of five sites for the government-sponsored project to develop reservoirs in the country. Once completed, the reservoirs are expected to be the largest in the world in their category, with a total length of 650 km and constructed at a cost of QR 14.5 billion. Rawdat Rashed's water reservoir is built at 50 ft above sea level, and will be used as the main water supply for the capital of Doha in the scenario of an electricity outage at the other stations. In June 2018, the first phase of the project was completed.

=== Landfill ===
Rawdat Rashed hosts one of the three major landfill sites in the country, primarily dedicated to construction and demolition waste.

In 2020, the landfill began processing a significant volume of recyclable construction materials, yielding approximately 434,000 tonnes of products such as rubble, powder, and gravel. The site also handled 482,402 discarded vehicle tires during the same year.

By mid-2024, the landfill's recycling operations had scaled dramatically. Over two million tonnes of construction waste were transformed into recycled building materials.

== Transport ==
Rawdat Rashed Road, a 33 kilometres (21 mi) road stretching through the city connected to Dukhan Highway, which links Dukhan and Doha, is known locally as the “road of death” due to the large number of fatal accidents which occur on the road. After announcing a redevelopment plan for the road in 2014, the Public Works Authority commenced redevelopment work in 2015. The redevelopment project, due for completion in late 2019, will also link the road with Salwa Road.

== Historical landmarks ==
=== Old mosque ===
Completed in 1948, the Old Mosque in Rawdat Rashed is notable for its aesthetics, particularly its tall and elegant minaret. The mosque's iwans are notably higher than those of most other old mosques, creating a more spacious interior. The mosque's courtyard can be entered through two simple post and lintel openings on the east and north sides; the original wooden doors having been lost to time. The courtyard itself consists of sandy soil with scattered desert plants. In the northeast corner of the courtyard stands the meda (ablution fountain), positioned behind a wall that matches the height of the courtyard's exterior walls.

The mosque's most distinctive element is its minaret, located at the southeast corner of the courtyard. Dominating the surrounding landscape, it features a square base nearly 3 meters high, topped by a cylindrical shaft rising another 6.3 meters, and crowned with a rounded cupola that adds another 4 meters, making the total height almost 13 meters. Eight thin square columns support the cupola. The minaret's slender spiral staircase, constructed from danshil wood and baszhil (bamboo laid over the wood beams), is bound together with ropes and coated with mud plaster.

The open iwan connects to the courtyard through six large rectangular openings with a straightforward post and lintel design. The decorative qibla (prayer wall facing Mecca) remains intact in all corners. The inner iwan of the qibla follows a similar design, being wide and narrow with a high ceiling and two windows at both ends. The qibla itself is square with a rounded roof. Originally, there were two narrow square slots on either side of the qibla for ventilation, though these are now absent.
