= Al Rekayya =

Al Rekayya الركية
- District
- Location within Qatar
- Coordinates: 25.0122°N 51.1585°E
- Country: Qatar
- Municipality: Al Rayyan
- Zone no.: Zone 83
- District no.: 531

Area
  - Total: 36.4 km^{2} (14.1 sq mi)

Al Rekayya (Arabic: الركية, romanized: Ar Rukayyah; also spelled Irkaya) is an agricultural district in southern Qatar, located in the municipality of Al Rayyan. It is close to the border with Al Wakrah Municipality.

Hassad Food owns a 162-hectare farm in Al Rekayya. As of 2012, the Qatari Arab Dairy Company (Ghadeer) owned and operated the largest farm in Qatar out of Al Rekayya. The farm spanned 1,200 hectares, had an inventory of roughly 2,400 cattle and primarily grew forage crops such as alfalfa and clover.

== Etymology ==
The district's name translates to "well". As an agricultural area located in a rawda (depression), the local well historically played an important role in its inhabitant's lives.

== Wildlife ==
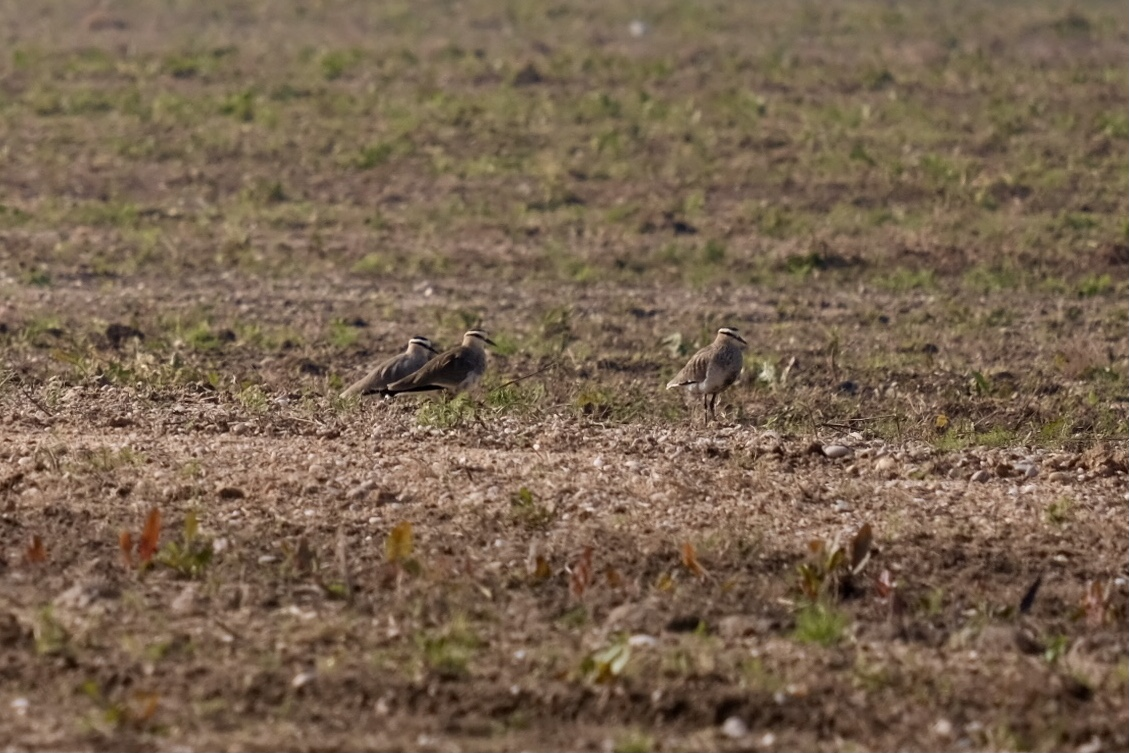
Sociable lapwing, one of the migratory birds that winters at Irkhaya Farms

Several species inhabit Irkaya, as well as a grey water pond adjacent to the district. Several migratory birds spend the winter, in Irkaya, attracting visitors which have been allowed to access the district.

== Gallery ==
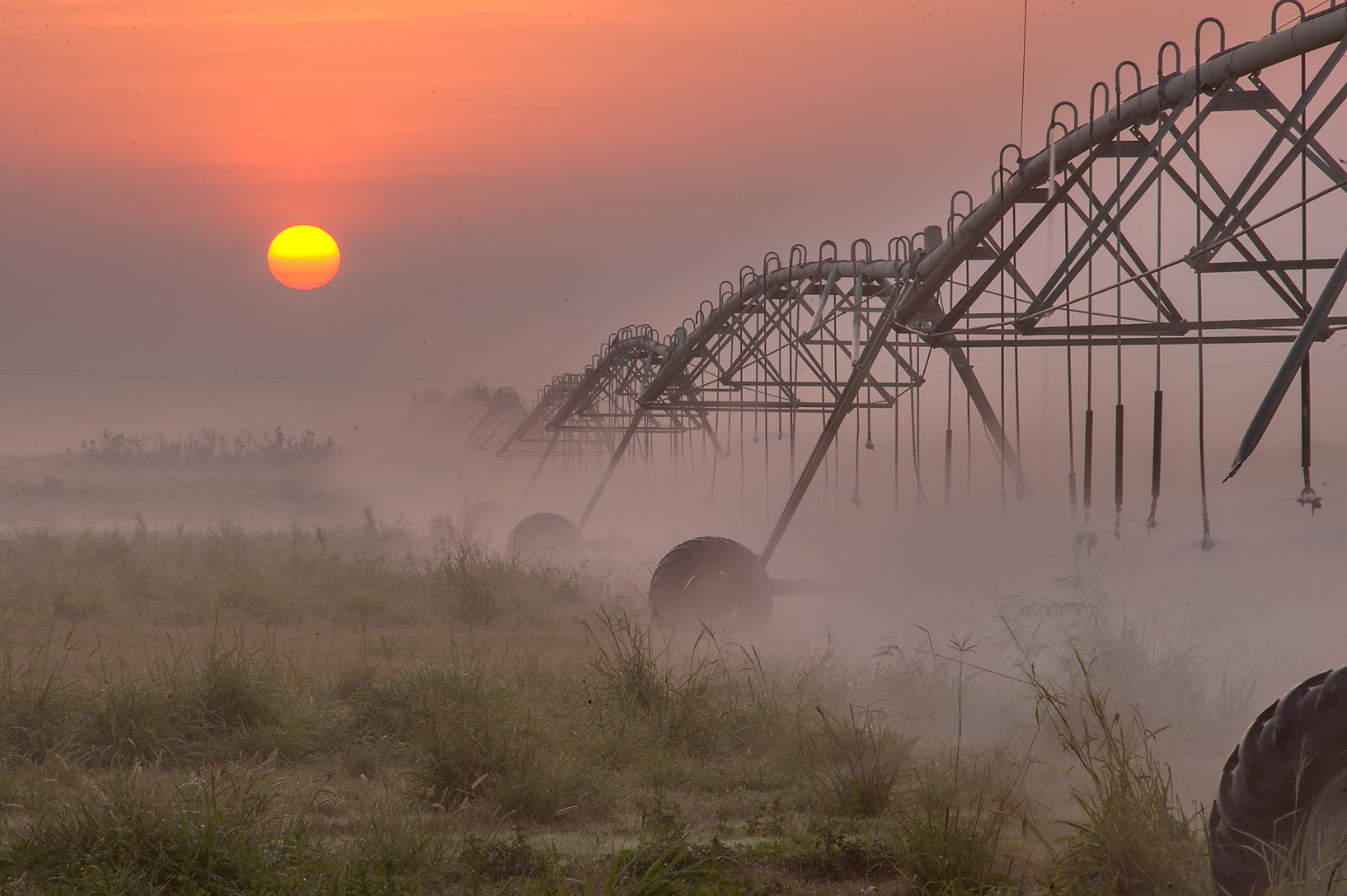
Center-pivot irrigation at Irkhaya Farms
