= Ministry of Sports and Youth (Qatar) =

Government ministry of Qatar

The Ministry of Sports and Youth is one of the ministries of the Qatari government and is located in Doha. It has 456 affiliated companies, and more than 600 employees. It cooperates with many committees and facilities. The Ministry of Youth and Sports was established by an Emiri Decree No. 16 of 2014 to promote youth and develop their skills, help them to perform their duties and raise the level of sports in the country. In 2016, the Ministry of Sports and Youth was merged with the Ministry of Culture, and in 2021 an Emiri decree was issued separating the Ministry of Culture from the Ministry of Sports and Youth. The ministry is currently held by Hamad Bin Khalifa Bin Ahmed Al-Thani.

== Ministry tasks ==
The ministry is responsible for general supervision of sports, youth and concerned authorities in the state to support and coordinate their works it is also responsible for setting conditions and standards for the establishment of clubs, centers, committees and associations for youth and sports and issuing license for them.

The ministry encourages the involvement of youth in conferences, courses and competitions, camps, trips and national and international festivals, sponsoring talented people to develop their skills and is conducting national and international sporting events.

- Raising the level of sport in the country
- Encouraging the community to practice sports as part of the lifestyle
- Expanding the base of sports participation and sponsoring national sports talents
- Contribute to the organization of national sporting events
- Supervising the monitoring of the compliance of national athletes with international sports regulations and controls
- Advance youth, develop their capabilities, and highlight their role in performing their duties
- General supervision of the authorities concerned with sports and youth welfare in the country, their support, follow-up of their work and coordination between them

== Cooperating committees with the Ministry ==
The Ministry cooperates with several committees to carry out various projects, including the following:

=== The Ministry's Supreme Committee for Delivery and Legacy ===
It is the committee in charge of the proposed sites and projects for the 2022 FIFA World Cup, being the first to be held in Arab countries, ensuring that they are compatible with Qatar National Vision 2030.

=== Qatar Olympic Committee ===
It is a Qatari body that was established in 1979 and was recognized by the International Olympic Committee in 1980, and its mission is to supervise the Olympic movement in Qatar and encourage the community to participate in sports. In addition to the development of athletes and participants to be at a world-class level, and it has a role in hosting sporting events either locally, regionally and internationally.
