= Mebaireek =

Mebaireek مبيريك
- Settlement
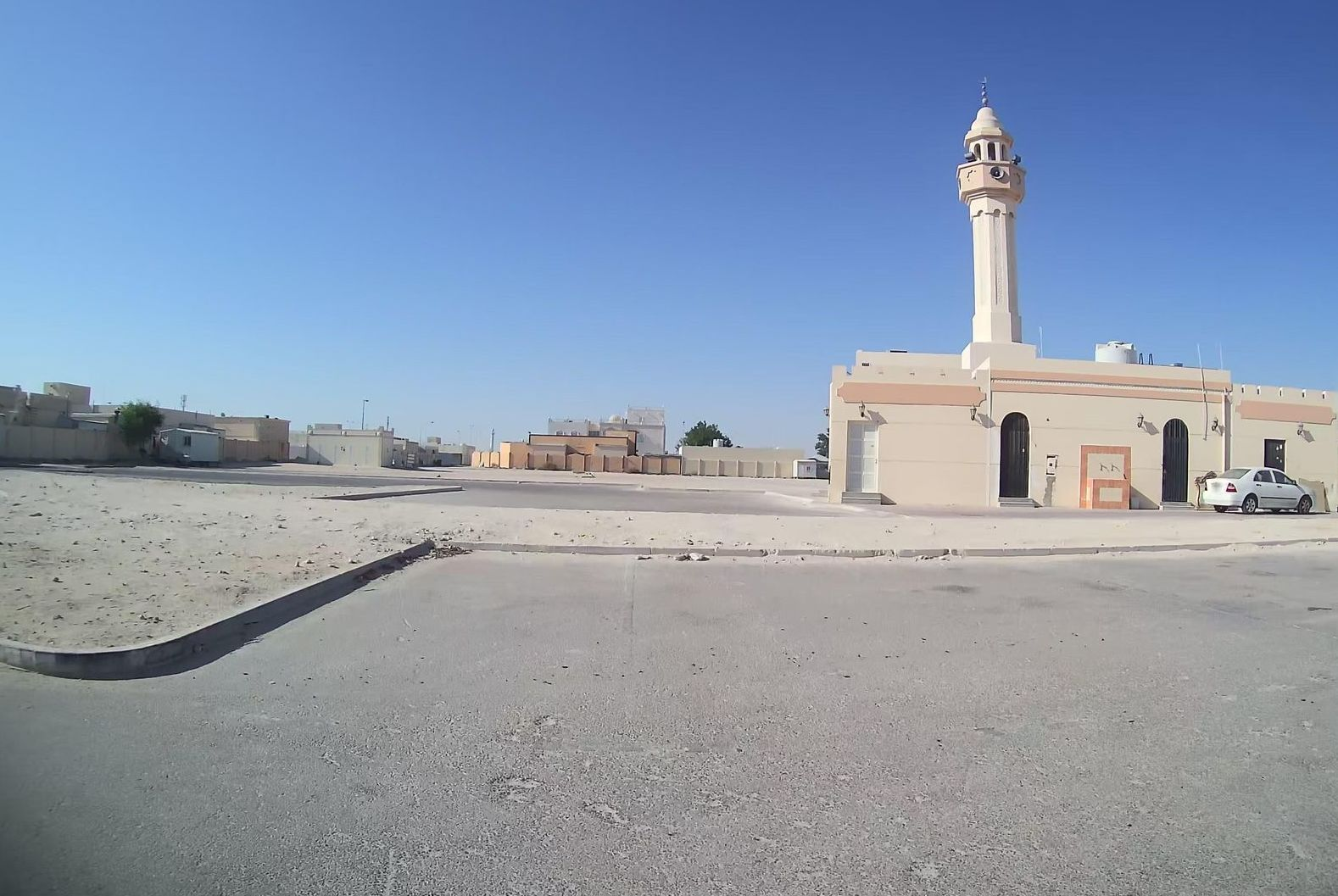
- Mosque on 307 Street in Mebaireek

- Location within Qatar
- Coordinates: 25.1900°N 51.3800°E
- Country: Qatar
- Municipality: Al Rayyan
- Zone: Zone 81
- District no.: 472

Area
  - Total: 15.4 km^{2} (5.9 sq mi)
- Elevation: 31 m (102 ft)

Mebaireek (Arabic: مبيريك, romanized: Mubaīrīk) is a settlement in Qatar, located in the municipality of Al Rayyan. It was formalized as one of Al Rayyan's ten administrative zones in the mid-2000s following the merger of the two census-designated districts of Abu Nakhla and Al Mukaynis. Al Mukaynis, which is known for Mudhlem Cave, is still in Zone 81 with Mebaireek whereas Abu Nakhla has moved to Al-Shahaniya Municipality.

== Etymology ==
"Mebaireek" originates from the Arabic name "Mubarak", and was named in honor of an esteemed resident who went by that name.

== Transport ==
Major roads that run through the district are Salwa Road and Mesaieed Road.

== Education ==
The following school is located in Mebaireek:

Name of School	Curriculum	Grade	Genders	Official Website	Ref
Abdullah bin Jassim Al Thani Boys School	Independent	Kindergarten – Primary	Male-only	N/A	
