= Madinat Khalifa =

Madinat Khalifa may refer to:

- Madinat Khalifa North, a district of Doha
- Madinat Khalifa South, a district of Doha
