= Dahl Al Hamam =

Dahl Al Hamam دحل الحمام
- District
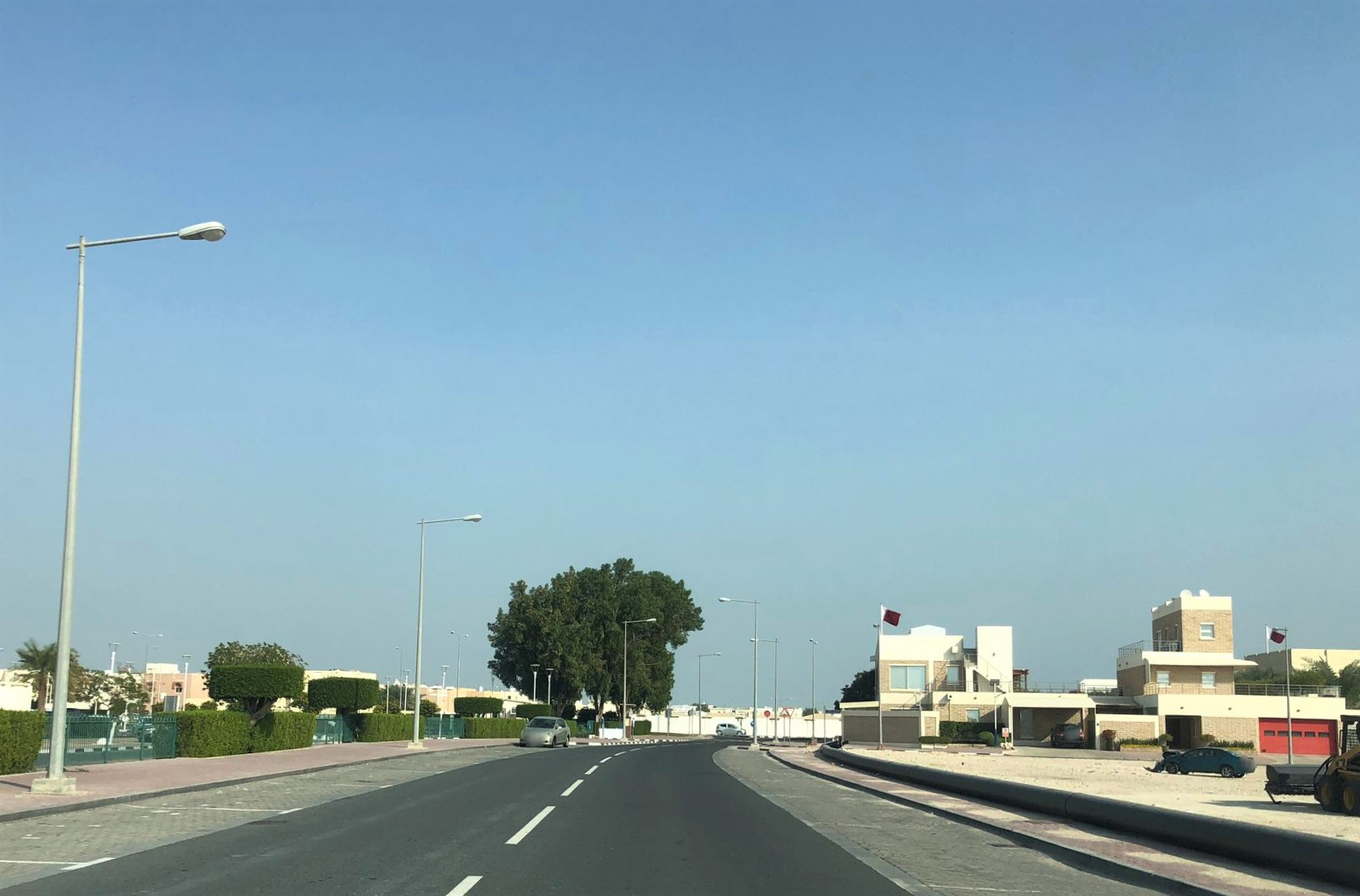
- Dahl Al Hamam Park (left) and Qatar Social Cultural Centre for the Blind (right)

- Location within Doha Location within Qatar
- Coordinates: 25.3335°N 51.4802°E
- Country: Qatar
- Municipality: Doha
- Zone: Zone 32
- District no.: 30

Area
  - Total: 1.4 km^{2} (0.54 sq mi)

Dahl Al Hamam (Arabic: دحل الحمام, romanized: Daḩl al Ḩammām) is a Qatari district located in the municipality of Doha.

Together with Madinat Khalifa North, which it is adjacent to in the south-west, it makes up Zone 32 which has a population of 12,364.

== Etymology ==
In Arabic, dahl translates to "cavern". The second constituent, hamam, translates to "pigeon". The district earned its name from a prominent cavern, presently found in Dahl Al Hamam Park, in which pigeons frequently laid their eggs.

== Visitor attractions ==
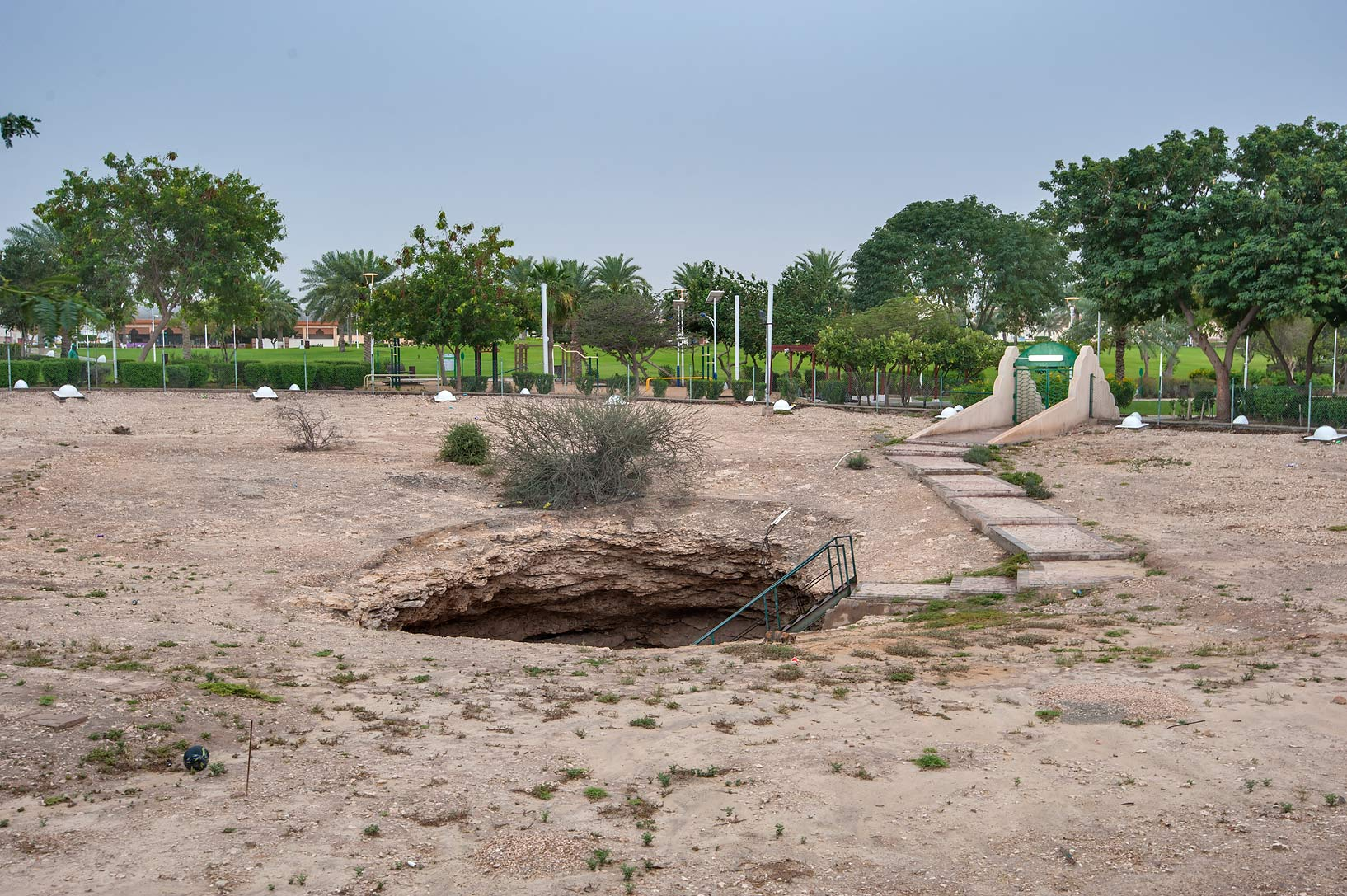
Cave in Dahl Al Hamam Park

Dahl Al Hamam Park is among the most popular parks in Qatar. Most notable about the park is the presence of an iconic cavern in its northern section which earned the district its name.

For the landscaping, over 50 ornamental plants are found throughout the park, many not native to the country. Occasionally, concerts and theatrical plays are held in the park's amphitheater.

There are three playgrounds for children of varying ages. The park is equipped with typical amenities, such as outdoor seating, bathrooms and a restaurant.

Also found in the district is the Qatar Social Cultural Centre for the Blind.

== Transport ==
Major roads that run through the district are Al Markhiya Street and Al Shamal Road.
