= Al Rufaa =

Al Rufaa الرفاع
- District
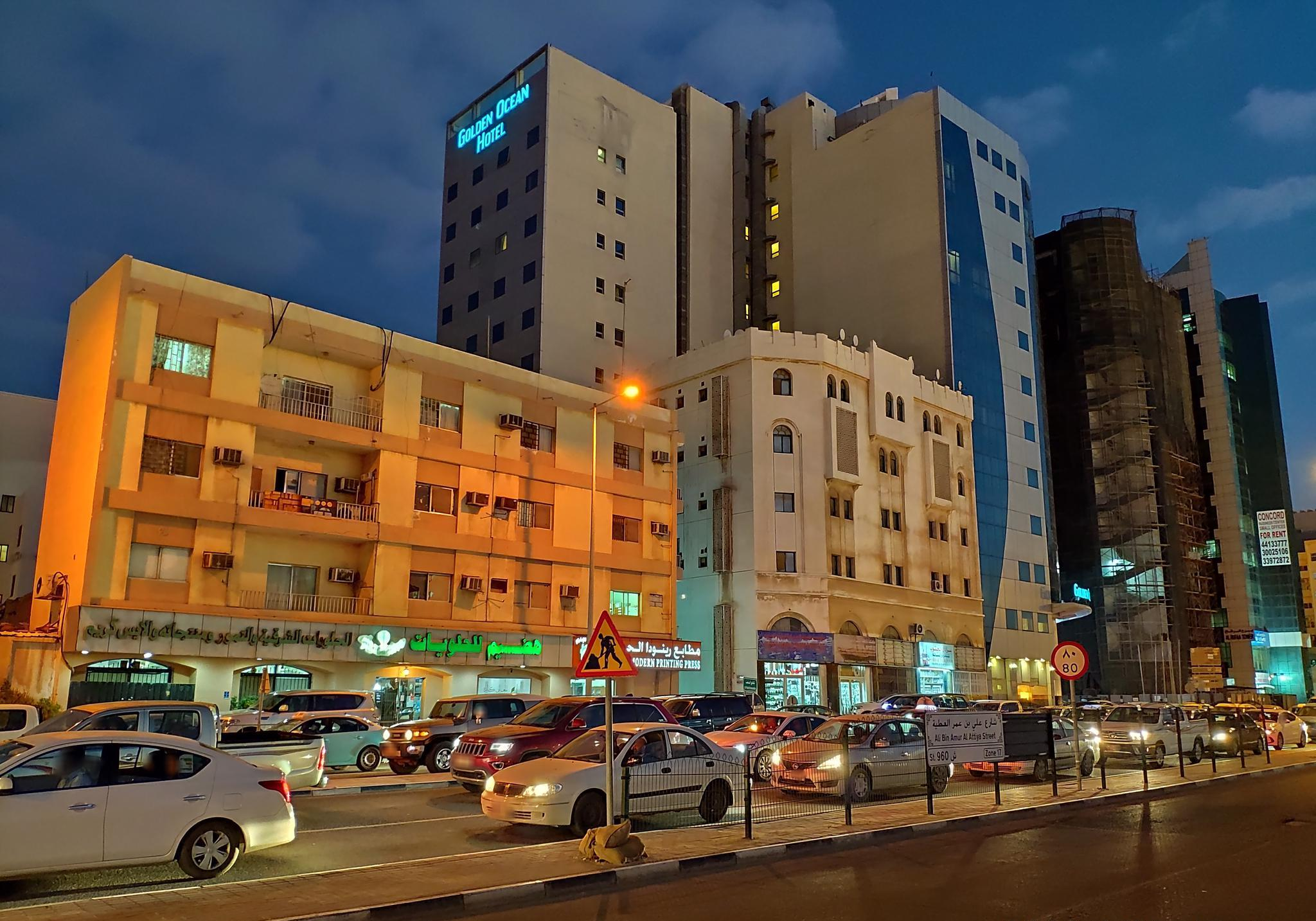
- Ali Bin Amr Al Attiya Street in Al Rufaa

- Location within Doha Location within Qatar
- Coordinates: 25.2853°N 51.5444°E
- Country: Qatar
- Municipalities of Qatar: Doha
- Zone: Zone 17
- District no.: 14

Area
  - Total: 0.35 km^{2} (0.14 sq mi)

Al Rufaa (Arabic: الرفاع, romanized: Ar-Rufā) is a neighborhood in the Qatari capital Doha. In the 2015 population census it was recorded as being in Zone 17 with Old Al Hitmi, which it borders to the east with the boundary being Sheraouh Street.

== Etymology ==
In Arabic, the term rufaa translates to "elevated", earning this name because of its relatively higher elevation than surrounding areas.

== Geography ==
Al Rufaa borders the following districts:

- Old Al Hitmi to the east, separated by Sheraouh Street.
- As Salatah and Al Mirqab to the north, separated by Museum Street.
- Old Al Ghanim to the west, separated by Jabr Bin Mohammed Street.
- Old Al Ghanim and Umm Ghuwailina to the south, separated by Ras Abu Aboud Street.

== Landmarks ==
The Qatar National Folkloric Troupe and Doha Sports Stadium are headquartered here.

A wedding celebration complex is located in Al Rufaa on Celebration Street. The complex consists of six entrance halls, five ceremonial halls, a gathering room and several corridors.

== Gallery ==
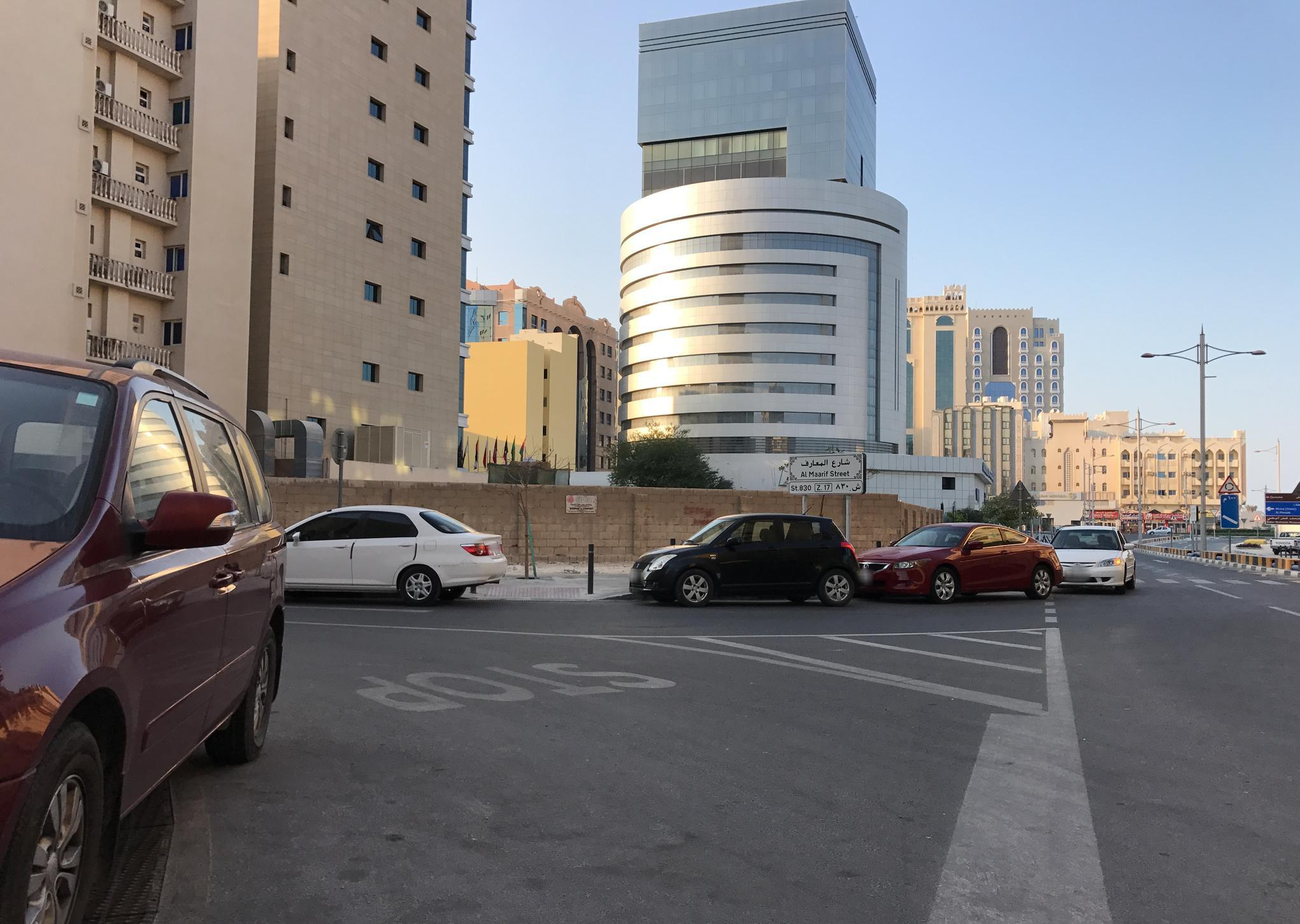
Al Maarif Street in Al Rufaa

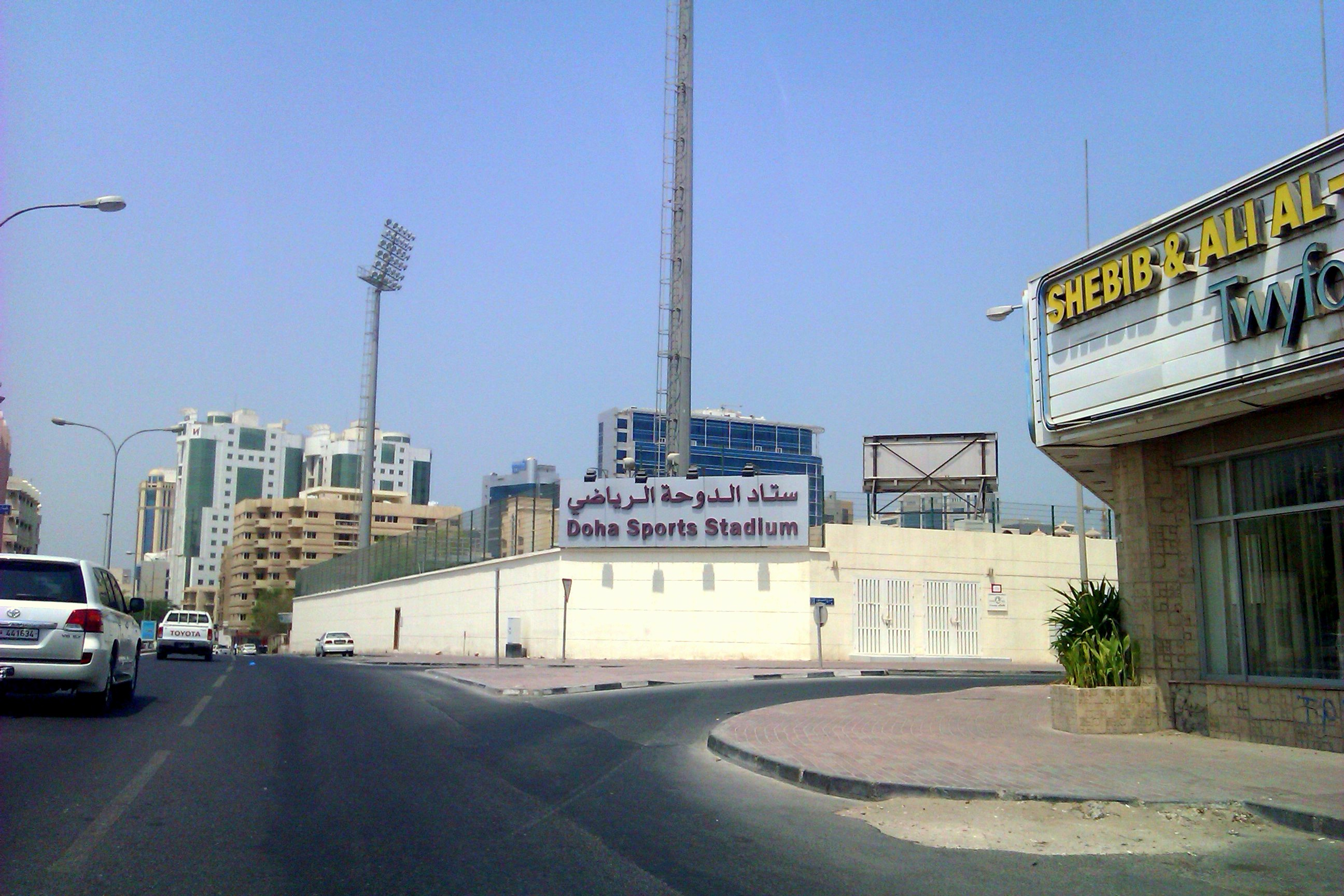
Doha Sports Stadium
