= Al Mirqab (Doha) =

Al Mirqab المرقاب
- District
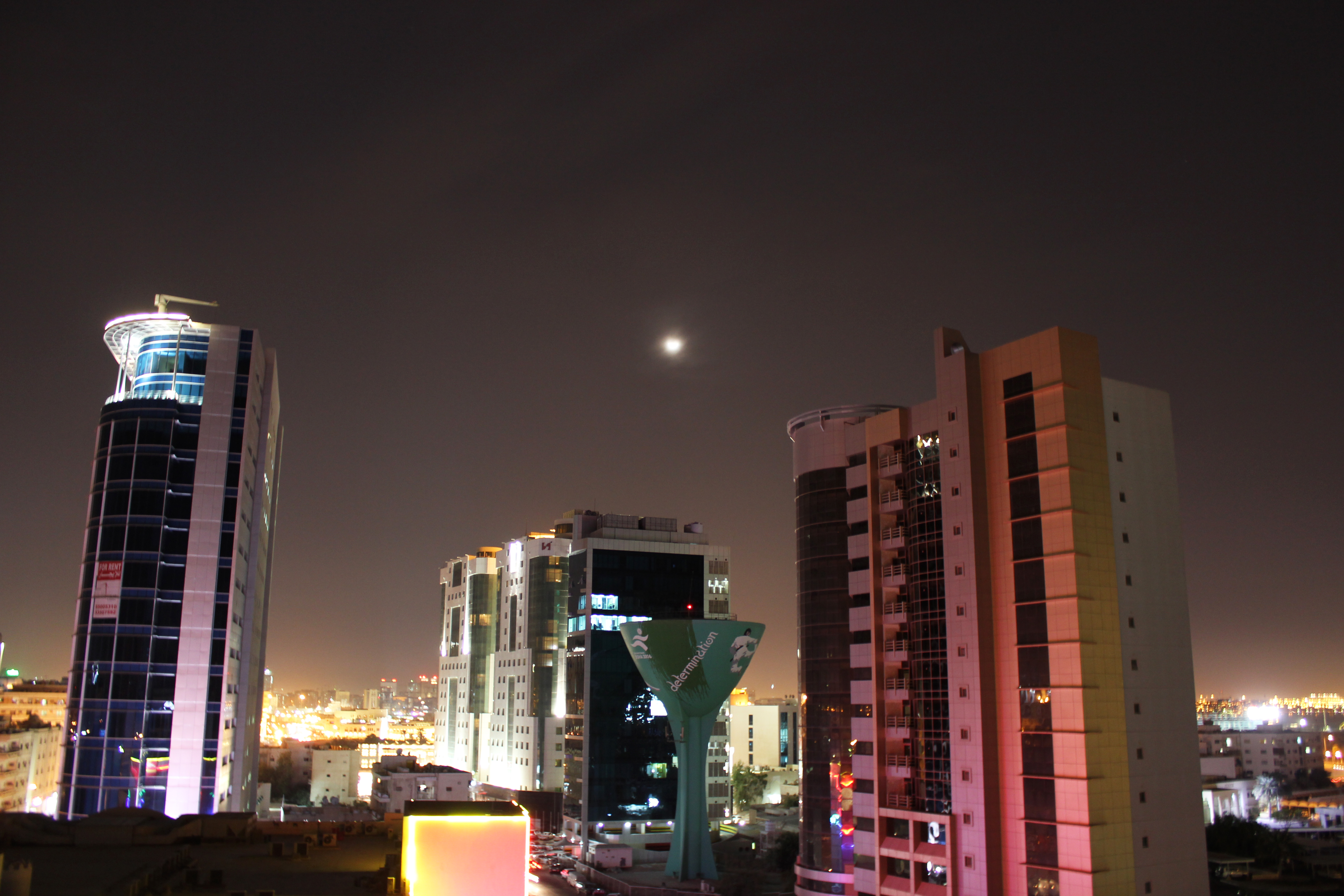
- Al Aaliya Street in Al Mirqab

- Location within Doha Location within Qatar
- Coordinates: 25.288642°N 51.541858°E
- Country: Qatar
- Municipality: Doha
- Zone: Zone 18
- District no.: 17

Area
  - Total: 0.25 km^{2} (0.097 sq mi)
- Elevation: 13 m (43 ft)

Al Mirqab (Arabic: المرقاب; also referred to as Fereej Al Mirqab) is a district in Qatar, located in the municipality of Doha.

Together with As Salatah, it makes up Qatar's Zone 18, with a population of 692 people.

== Etymology ==
An Arabic word, mirqab is derived from muraqabah, which in English translates to "watching". This name was, in turn, derived from Mirqab ash-Sharqi, translating to "eastern watchtower", a historic watchtower built here in the 20th century to survey the sea and identify incoming ships.

== History ==
Al Mirqab was first mentioned J.G. Lorimer's Gazetteer of the Persian Gulf written in 1907.

== Geography ==
Al Mirqab borders the following districts:

- Al Souq to the west, separated by Jabr Bin Mohammed Street.
- Doha Port to the north, separated by Corniche Street.
- As Salatah to the east, separated by Ali Bin Amur Al Attiyah Street.
- Al Rufaa to the south, separated by Al Mathaf (Museum) Street.

== Transport ==
Currently, the underground Al Mirqab Metro Station is under construction, having been launched during Phase 2C. Once completed, it will be part of Doha Metro's Gold Line.

== See also ==
- New Al Mirqab
