= Old Al Hitmi =

Old Al Hitmi الهتمي العتيق
- District
- Location within Doha Location within Qatar
- Coordinates: 25.2849°N 51.5479°E
- Country: Qatar
- Municipality: Doha
- Zone: Zone 17
- District no.: 15

Area
  - Total: 0.019 sq mi (0.05 km^{2})

Old Al Hitmi (Arabic: الهتمي العتيق, romanized: Al-Hitmī al-'Tīq; also known as Al-Hitmi Al-Ateeq or simply Al Hitmi) is a mixed-use district in Qatar, located in the municipality of Doha. The name is derived from Al-Hitmi family, which is a branch of the main Al Bin Ali tribe. Together with Al Rufaa, the district forms Zone 17, which has a population of 6,028.

== History ==
The area was first settled in the early 1900s by the Al Bin Ali tribe, and the district was colloquially referred to as Al Bin Ali. In the 1930s, many members of the Al Hitmi family, a branch of the Al Bin Ali tribe, settled here, resulting in the district adopting its current name of Al Hitmi around the 1940s. Most residential units here date back to the early-to-mid 20th century. As a result of many years of neglect, most of the older buildings have fallen into varying states of disrepair. After Qatar began profiting from oil extraction in the 1970s and 1980s, many modernistic high-rise buildings were constructed. Currently, the neighborhood suffers from cluttered roads and a shortage of sidewalks, pedestrian crossings and parking spaces.

== Gallery ==
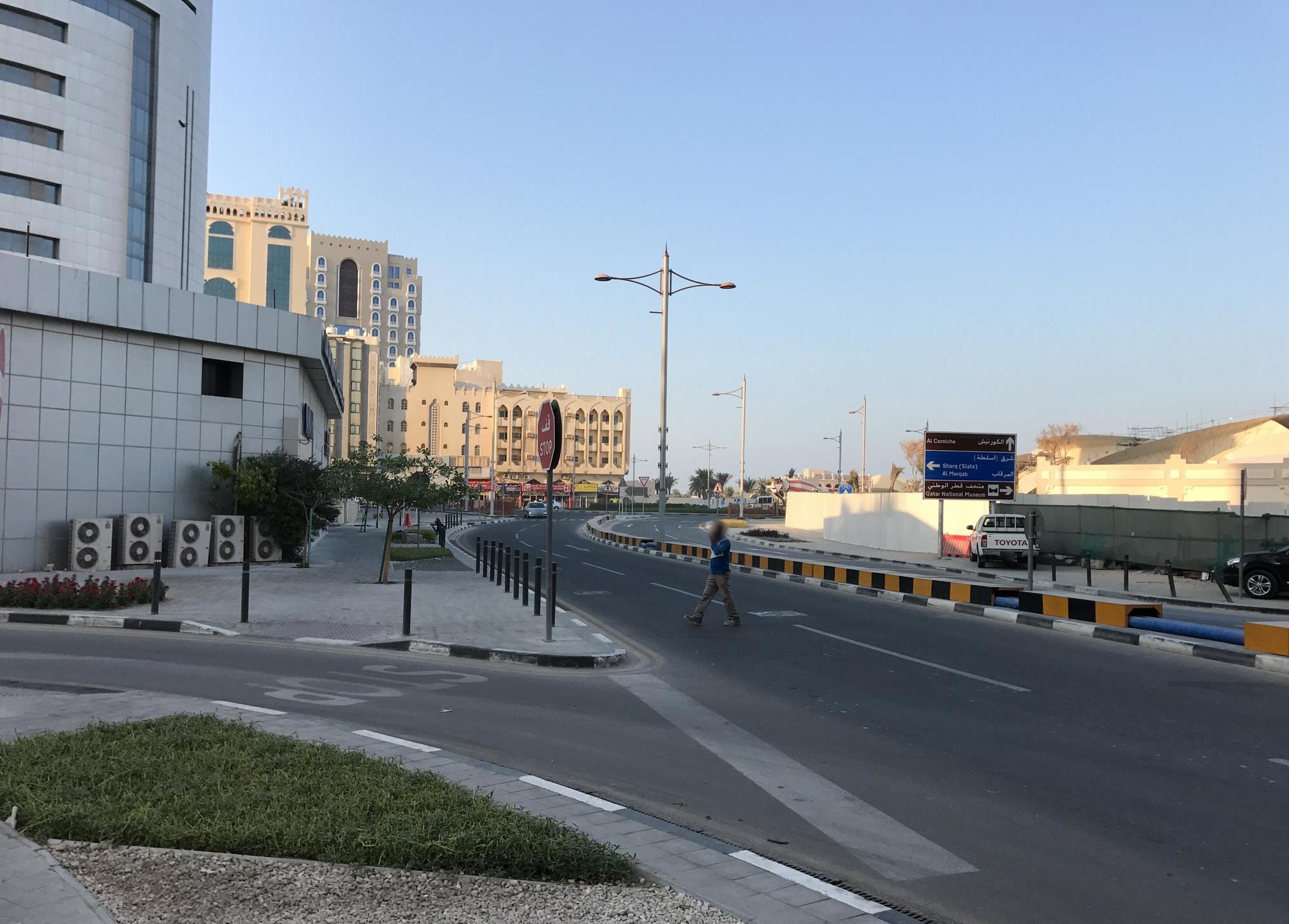
Sheraouh Street in Old Al Hitmi. The district's northern boundaries are at the National Museum of Qatar (seen on the far right), which is located in Old Salatah.

== See also ==
- New Al Hitmi
