= Zone 32, Qatar =

Zone 32
- Zone
- Interactive map of Zone 32
- Coordinates: 25.328103°N 51.475407°E
- Country: Qatar
- Municipality: Doha
- Blocks: 68

Area
  - Total: 2.4 km^{2} (0.93 sq mi)

Population
  - Total: 12,364 (2,015)
- Time zone: UTC+03 (Arabia Standard Time)
- ISO 3166 code: QA-DA

Zone 28 is a zone of the municipality of Doha in the state of Qatar. The main districts recorded in the 2015 population census were Madinat Khalifa North and Dahl Al Hamam.

== Demographics ==
Year	Population
1986	5,958
1997	7,780
2004	8,246
2010	14,725
2015	12,364

== Land use ==
The Ministry of Municipality and Environment (MME) breaks down land use in the zone as follows.

Area (km^{2})	Developed land (km^{2})	Undeveloped land (km^{2})	Residential (km^{2})	Commercial/ Industrial (km^{2})	Education/ Health (km^{2})	Farming/ Green areas (km^{2})	Other uses (km^{2})
2.42	1.58	0.84	1.01	0.01	0.15	0.00	0.41
