= Hamad Medical City =

Hamad Medical City مدينة حمد الطبية
- District
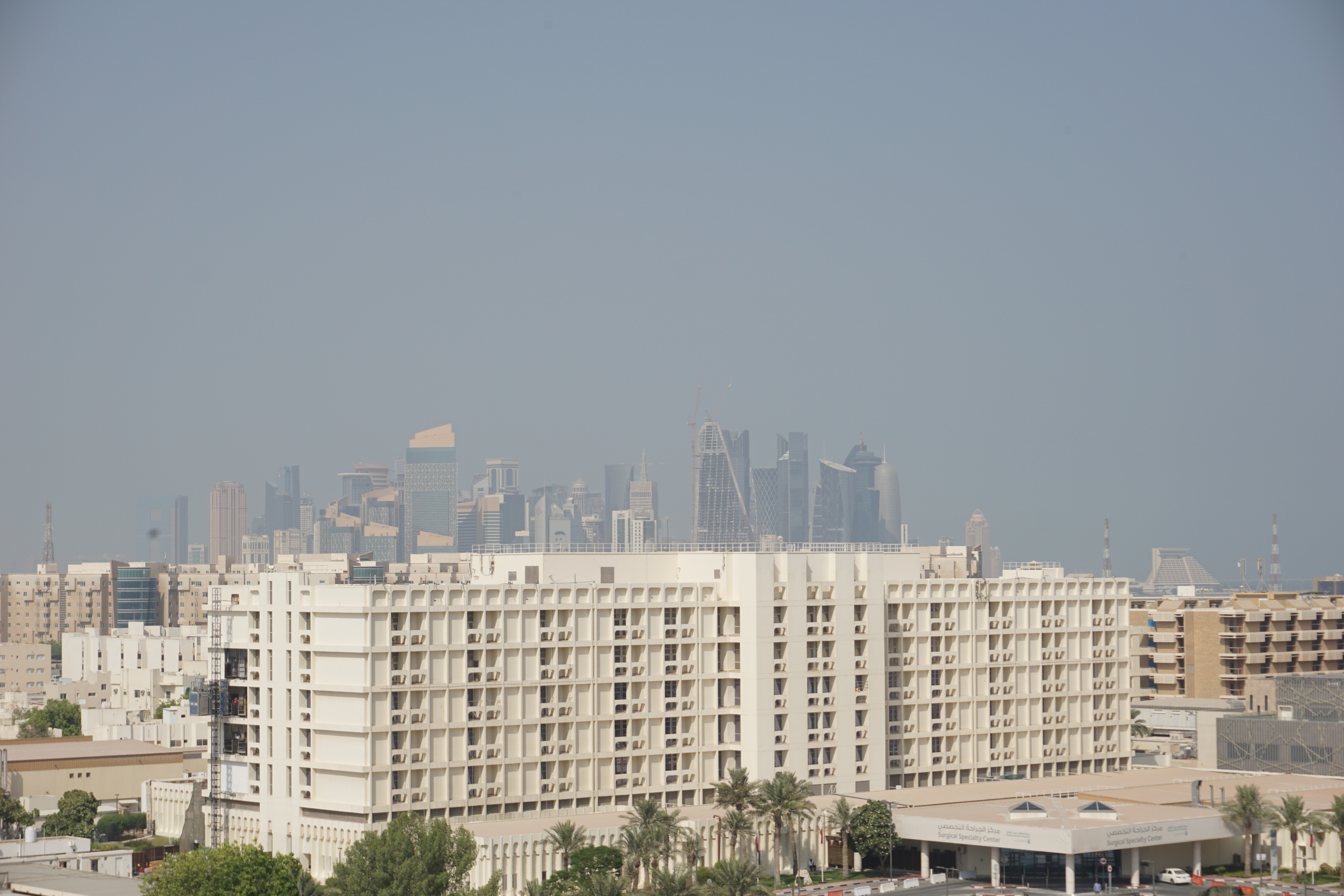
- Surgical Specialty Center in Hamad Medical City

- Location within Doha Location within Qatar
- Coordinates: 25.295237°N 51.501523°E
- Country: Qatar
- Municipality: Doha
- Zone: Zone 37
- District no.: 37

Area
  - Total: 0.65 km^{2} (0.25 sq mi)
- Elevation: 21 m (69 ft)

Hamad Medical City (Arabic: مدينة حمد الطبية) is a Qatari district in the municipality of Doha. Together with New Al Hitmi and Fereej Bin Omran, it makes up Zone 37 which has a total population of 26,121. It is administered by Hamad Medical Corporation (HMC). The district is closely associated with Rumeilah to the east as it also hosts several of HMC's medical facilities.

== Geography ==
Hamad Medical City borders the following districts:

- Al Sadd to the south, separated by Al Rayyan Road.
- New Al Hitmi to the west, separated by Mohammed Bin Thani Street.
- Rumeilah to the east, separated by Ahmed Bin Ali Street.
- Fereej Bin Omran and Wadi Al Sail to the north, separated by Mohammed Bin Thani Street.

== Infrastructure ==
Hamad Medical Corporation operates the Women's Hospital and Hamad Hospital out of the district. HMC also has the following facilities set up in the district:

- Human Resources Department.
- Quality Management Department on Al Rayyan Road.
- Security Department on Umm Al Obairiyat Street.
- Hamad International Training Centre on Umm Al Obairiyat Street.

The Ministry of Awqaf and Islamic Affairs and the Advisory Council also have offices in the district.

== Transport ==
The construction of the underground Hamad Hospital Station was launched during Phase 1. The station was opened to the public on 10 December 2019 along with the other stations of the Green Line (also known as the Education Line).

== Gallery ==
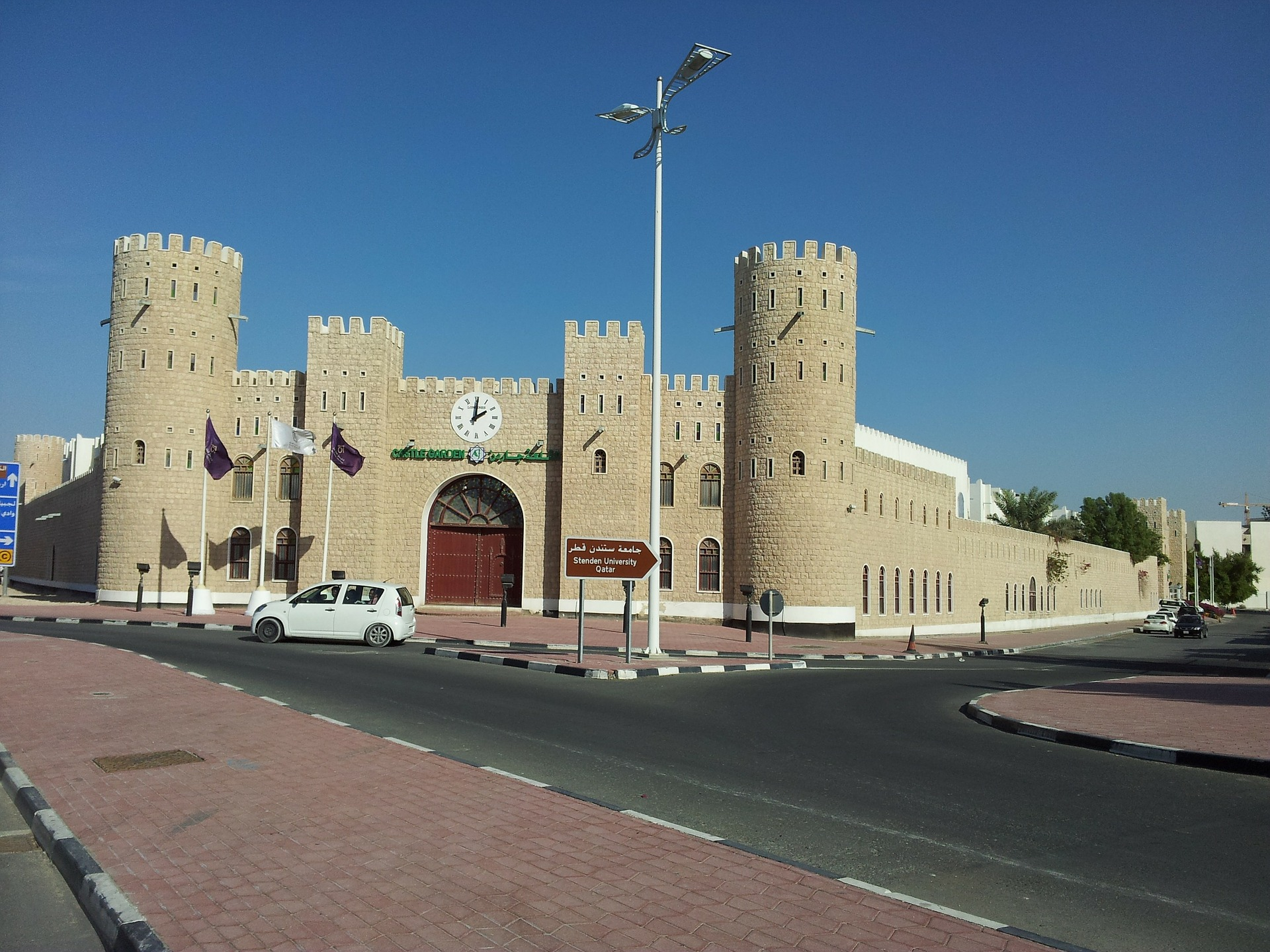
Castle Gardens Compound in Hamad Medical City

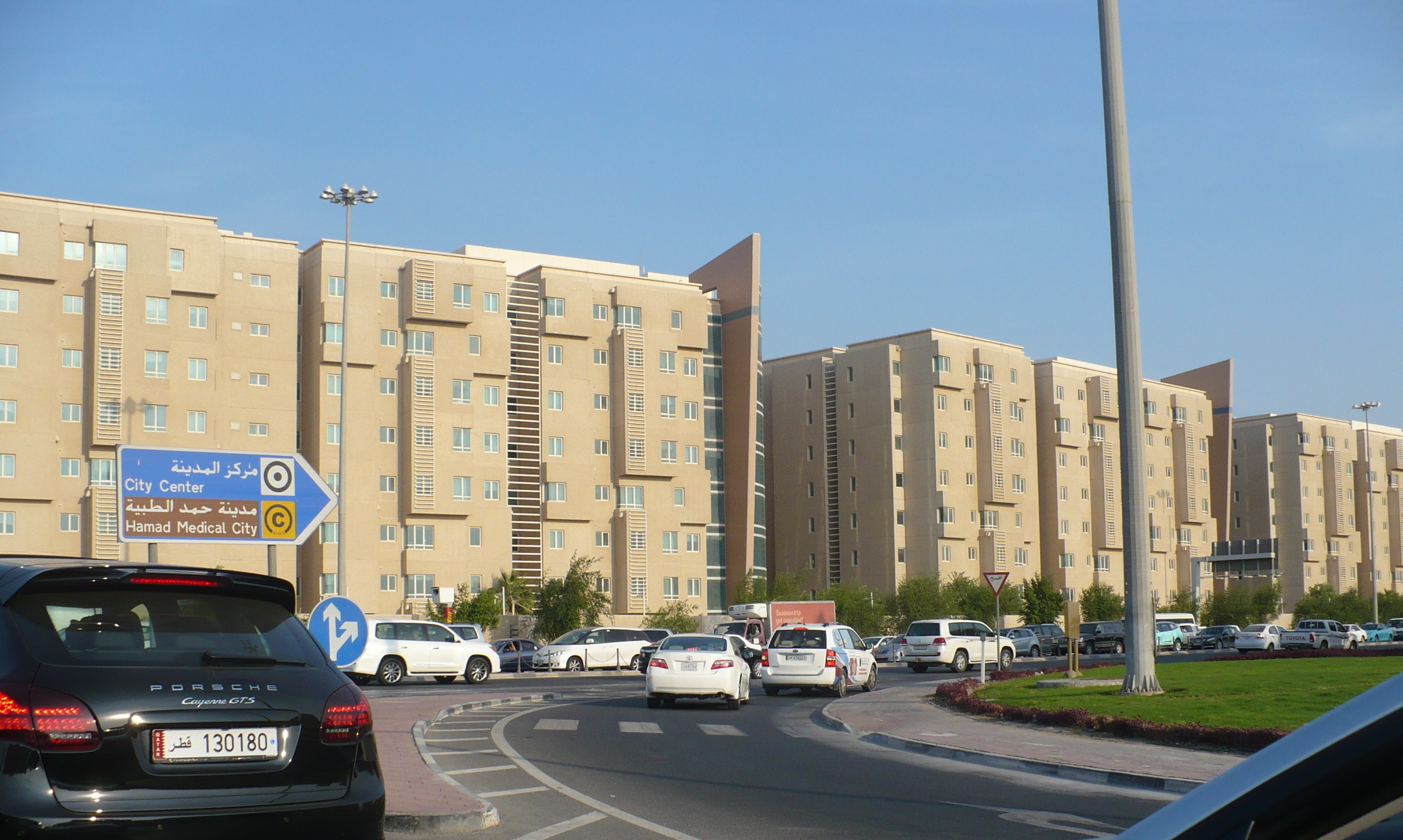
Office buildings in Hamad Medical City
