= Fereej Bin Omran =

Fereej Bin Omran فريج بن عمران
- District
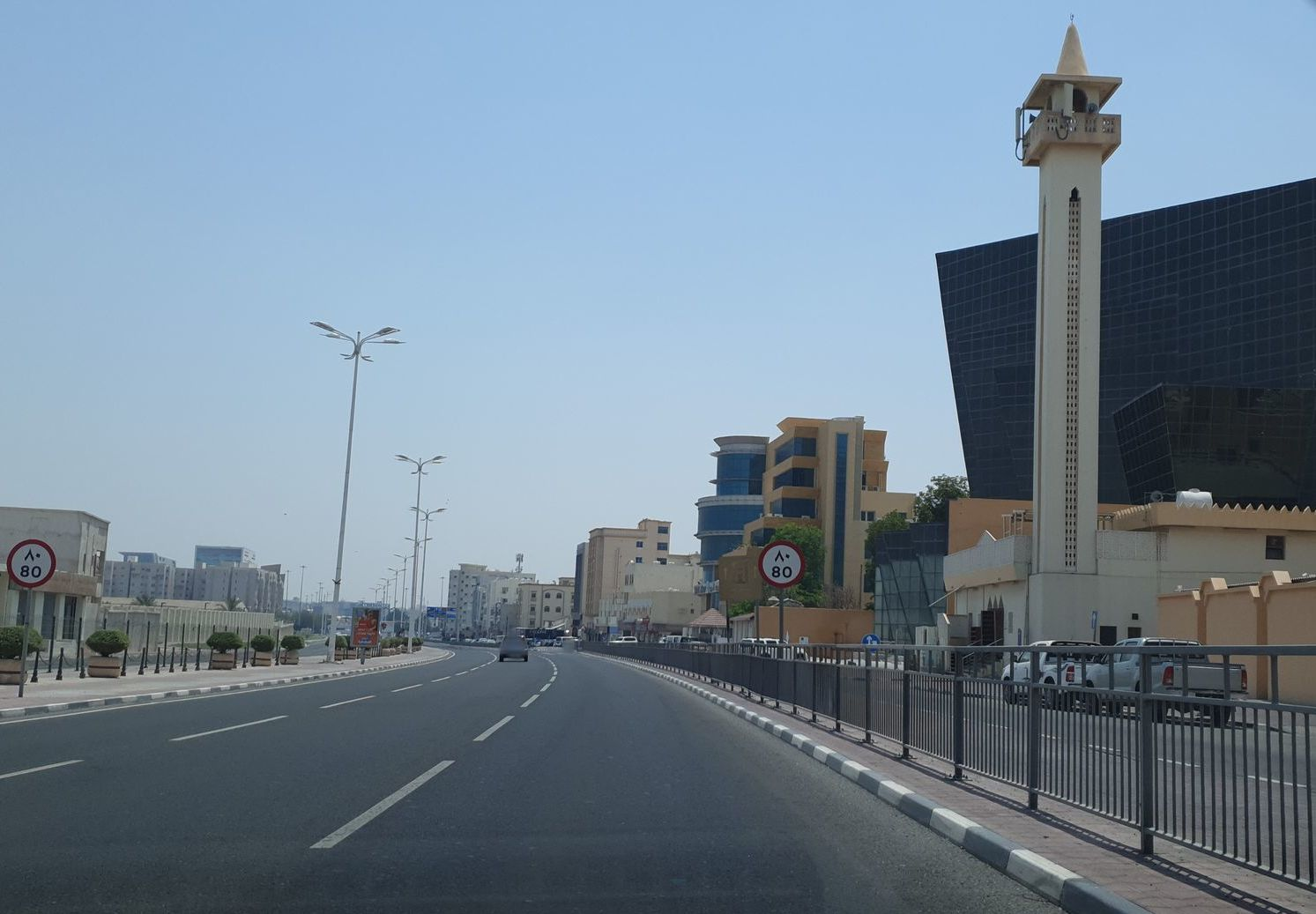
- Ahmed Bin Ali Street in Fereej Bin Omran.

- Location within Doha Location within Qatar
- Coordinates: 25°18′16″N 51°29′43″E
- Country: Qatar
- Municipality: Doha
- Zone: Zone 37
- District no.: 35

Area
  - Total: 1.0 km^{2} (0.39 sq mi)

Fereej Bin Omran (Arabic: فريج بن عمران, romanized: Farīj Bin 'Umrān) is a district in Qatar, located in the municipality of Doha. Together with New Al Hitmi and Hamad Medical City, it makes up Qatar's Zone 37, with a total population of 26,121.

== Landmarks ==
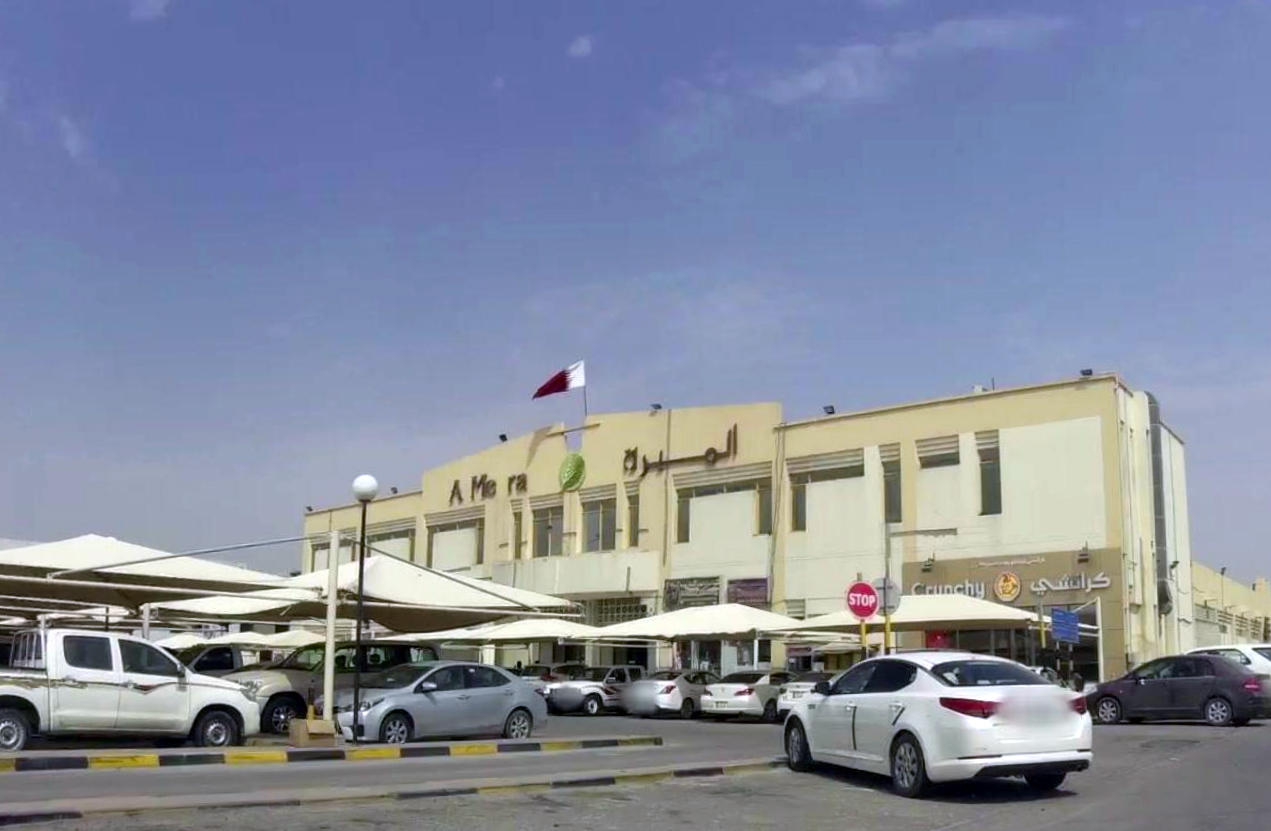
View from Al Abdali Street of Al Meera Supercenter in Fereej Bin Omran.

- Elite Medical Center on Al Jazira Al Arabiya Street.
- Al Rawnaq Trading Complex on Ahmed Bin Ali Street.
- The TADDAC (Training and Development of Differently Abled Children) Centre is located in the district.

== Transport ==
Mowasalat is the official transport company of Qatar and serves the community through its operation of public bus routes. Fereej Bin Omran is served by one bus line which departs from Al Ghanim Bus Station. Route 55 has stops at Fereej Bin Omran and Madinat Khalifa South and a terminus at Madinat Khalifa Bus Stop near the Immigration Department, running at a frequency of every 30 minutes on all days of the week.
