= New Al Hitmi =

New Al Hitmi الهتمي الجديد
- District
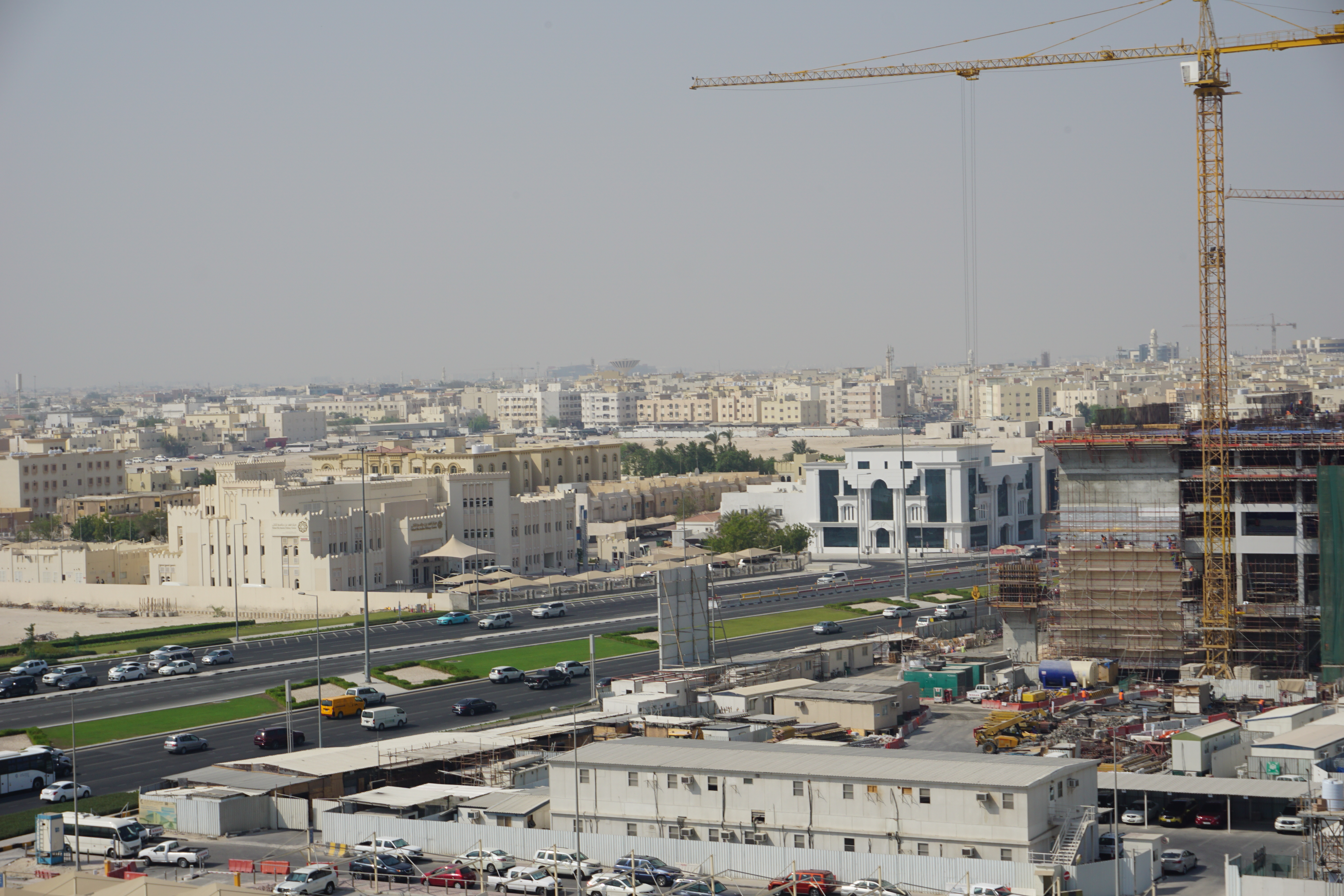
- Mohammed Bin Thani Street (center) in New Al Hitmi

- Location within Doha Location within Qatar
- Coordinates: 25.2980°N 51.4927°E
- Country: Qatar
- Municipality: Doha
- Zone: Zone 37
- District no.: 36

Area
  - Total: 0.35 sq mi (0.9 km^{2})

New Al Hitmi (Arabic: الهتمي الجديد; also known as Al-Hitmi Al-Jadeed) is a Qatari district located in the municipality of Doha. The name is derived from the Al-Hitmi family, which is a branch of the main Al Bin Ali tribe. Together with Fereej Bin Omran and Hamad Medical City, it forms Zone 37, which has a population of 26,121.

== Geography ==
New Al Hitmi borders the following districts:

- Hamad Medical City to the east, separated by Mohammed Bin Thani Street.
- Al Sadd to the south, separated by Al Rayyan Road.
- Al Messila to the west, separated by Jassim Bin Hamad Street.
- Fereej Bin Omran to the north, separated by Al Yarmouk Street.

== Landmarks ==
- Al Hitmi Park on Athba Street.
- Fahad Bin Jassim Kidney Centre on Al Rasheed Street.
- American Education Centre on Jassim bin Hamad Street.
- National Council For Culture, Arts and Heritage on Al Yamama Street.
- Nasser Gardens on Mohammed bin Thani Street.
- Friends of the Environment Centre on Al Rasheed Street.
- Doha Youth Centre on Sahat Al Ikhlas Street.

== See also ==
- Old Al Hitmi
