= Zone 37, Qatar =

Zone 37
- Zone
- Interactive map of Zone 37
- Coordinates: 25.299405°N 51.495734°E
- Country: Qatar
- Municipality: Doha
- Blocks: 77

Area
  - Total: 2.5 km^{2} (0.97 sq mi)

Population
  - Total: 26,121 (2,015)
- Time zone: UTC+03 (Arabia Standard Time)
- ISO 3166 code: QA-DA

Zone 37 is a zone of the municipality of Doha in the state of Qatar. The main districts recorded in the 2015 population census were Fereej Bin Omran, New Al Hitmi, and Hamad Medical City.

== Demographics ==
Year	Population
1986	11,873
1997	12,502
2004	13,189
2010	21,066
2015	26,121

== Land use ==
The Ministry of Municipality and Environment (MME) breaks down land use in the zone as follows.

Area (km^{2})	Developed land (km^{2})	Undeveloped land (km^{2})	Residential (km^{2})	Commercial/ Industrial (km^{2})	Education/ Health (km^{2})	Farming/ Green areas (km^{2})	Other uses (km^{2})
2.52	1.79	0.72	1.01	0.04	0.52	0.00	0.22
