= Zone 17, Qatar =

Zone 17
- Zone
- Interactive map of Zone 17
- Coordinates: 25.284633°N 51.545384°E
- Country: Qatar
- Municipality: Doha
- Blocks: 33

Area
  - Total: 0.4 km^{2} (0.15 sq mi)

Population (2015)
  - Total: 6,026
  - Density: 15,000/km^{2} (39,000/sq mi)
- Time zone: UTC+03 (Arabia Standard Time)
- ISO 3166 code: QA-DA

Zone 17 is a zone of the municipality of Doha in the state of Qatar. The main districts recorded in the 2015 population census were Al Rufaa and Old Al Hitmi.

== Demographics ==
Year	Population
1986	4,200
1997	4,304
2004	6,130
2010	7,124
2015	6,026

== Land use ==
The breakdown of the Ministry of Municipality and Environment's land use in the zone is as follows.

Area (km^{2})	Developed land (km^{2})	Undeveloped land (km^{2})	Residential (km^{2})	Commercial/ Industrial (km^{2})	Education/ Health (km^{2})	Farming/ Green areas (km^{2})	Other uses (km^{2})
0.40	0.24	0.16	0.09	0.02	0.04	0.00	0.09
