= Zone 18, Qatar =

Zone 18
- Zone
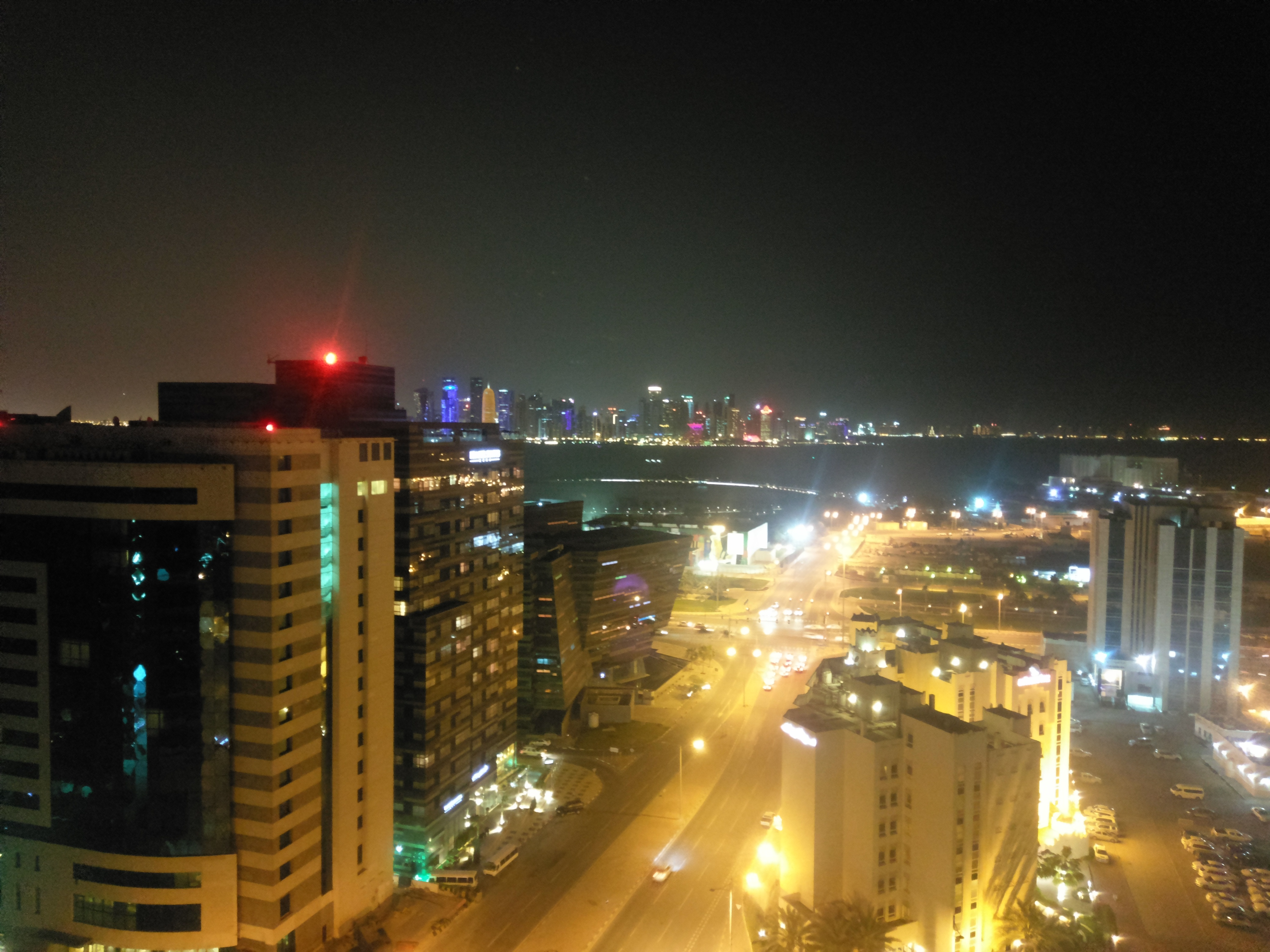
- Al Mirqab (left) and As Salata (right), separated by Ali Bin Amur Al Attiyah
- Interactive map of Zone 18
- Coordinates: 25.289334°N 51.544812°E
- Country: Qatar
- Municipality: Doha
- Blocks: 27

Area
  - Total: 0.63 km^{2} (0.24 sq mi)

Population (2015)
  - Total: 692
  - Density: 1,100/km^{2} (2,800/sq mi)
- Time zone: UTC+03 (Arabia Standard Time)
- ISO 3166 code: QA-DA

Zone 18 is a zone of the municipality of Doha in Qatar. The main districts recorded in the 2015 population census were As Salatah and Al Mirqab.

== Demographics ==
Year	Population
1986	1,129
1997	658
2004	777
2010	742
2015	692

== Land use ==
The Ministry of Municipality and Environment (MME) breaks down land use in the zone as follows.

Area (km^{2})	Developed land (km^{2})	Undeveloped land (km^{2})	Residential (km^{2})	Commercial/ Industrial (km^{2})	Education/ Health (km^{2})	Farming/ Green areas (km^{2})	Other uses (km^{2})
0.63	0.36	0.27	0.03	0.04	0.00	0.00	0.29
