= Madinat Khalifa South =

Madinat Khalifa South مدينه خليفه الجنوبيه
- District
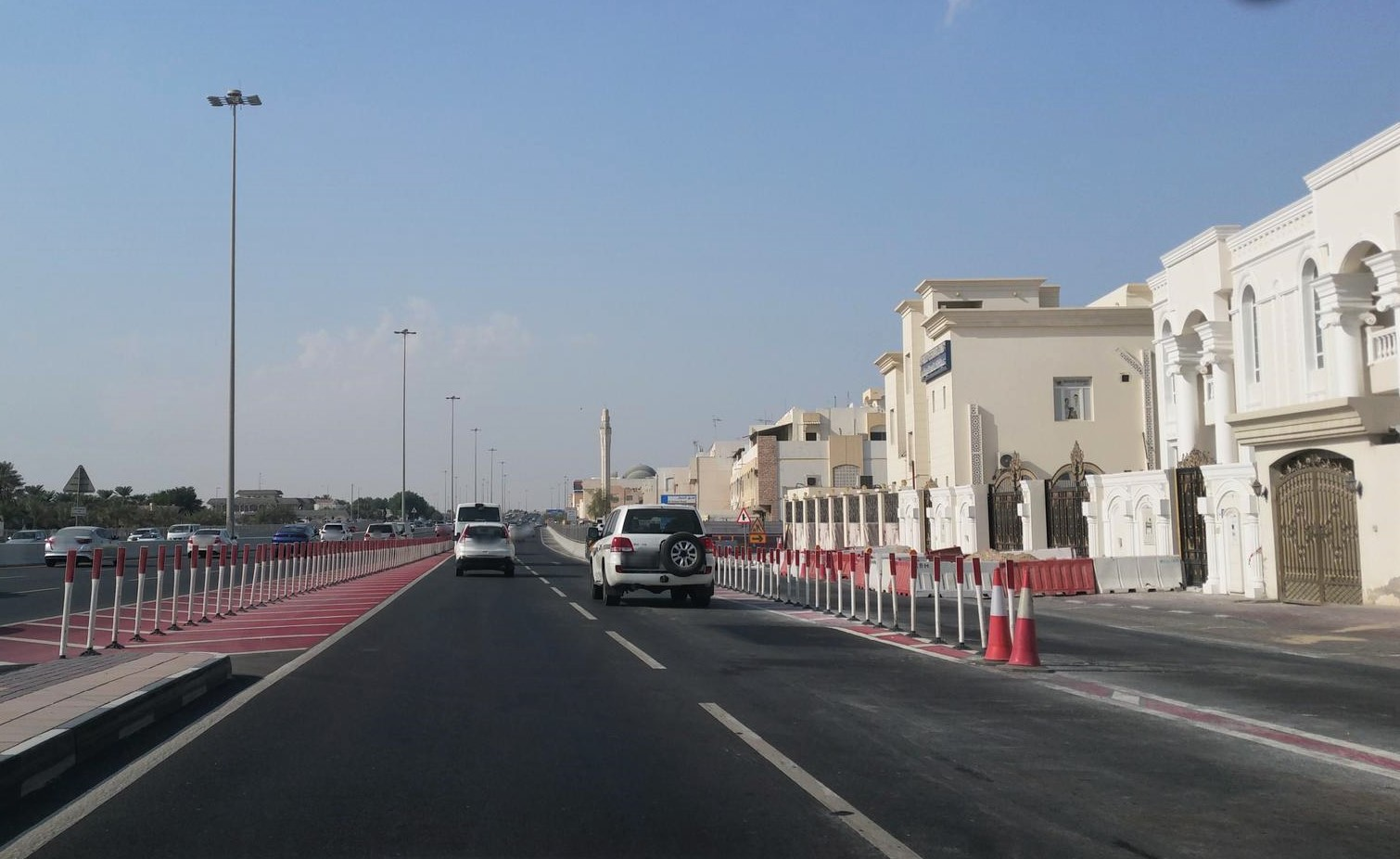
- Al Rayyan Road in Madinat Khalifa South

- Location within Doha Location within Qatar
- Coordinates: 25.3156°N 51.4808°E
- Country: Qatar
- Municipality: Doha
- Zone: Zone 34
- District no.: 32

Area
  - Total: 2.6 km^{2} (1.0 sq mi)

Population (2004)
  - Total: 19,821
  - Density: 7,600/km^{2} (20,000/sq mi)

Madinat Khalifa South (Arabic: مدينه خليفه الجنوبيه, romanized: Madīnat Khalīfah al Janūbīyah) is a north-western district of Qatari capital Doha. It is one of the two sections of Madinat Khalifa, the other being Madinat Khalifa North. The district was constructed in the 1970s by the Emir of Qatar at the time, Sheikh Khalifa bin Hamad Al Thani, primarily to serve as a residential district for Qatari families. Shortages of affordable housing in the district have fueled illegal construction practices such as constructing additional floors.

== Etymology ==
In Arabic, madinat means "city". The second part of the name was received from Khalifa bin Hamad Al Thani, who was emir of Qatar from 1972 to 1995 and who oversaw the district's development. Finally, the "south" component was added to the name to differentiate it from the Madinat Khalifa North district. The Qatari government sometimes refers to the district as Madinat Khalifa Al Janoubiya, preferring the Arabic term for "south".

== Areas ==
=== Gaza ===
The Gaza area of Madinat Khalifa South was named in honor of the Gaza Strip in Palestine. Presently, the area is used primarily for housing laborers. It contains a wealth of historic architecture. Like most other historic areas in Doha's districts, its streets are narrow and its houses are densely packed together.

== Landmarks ==
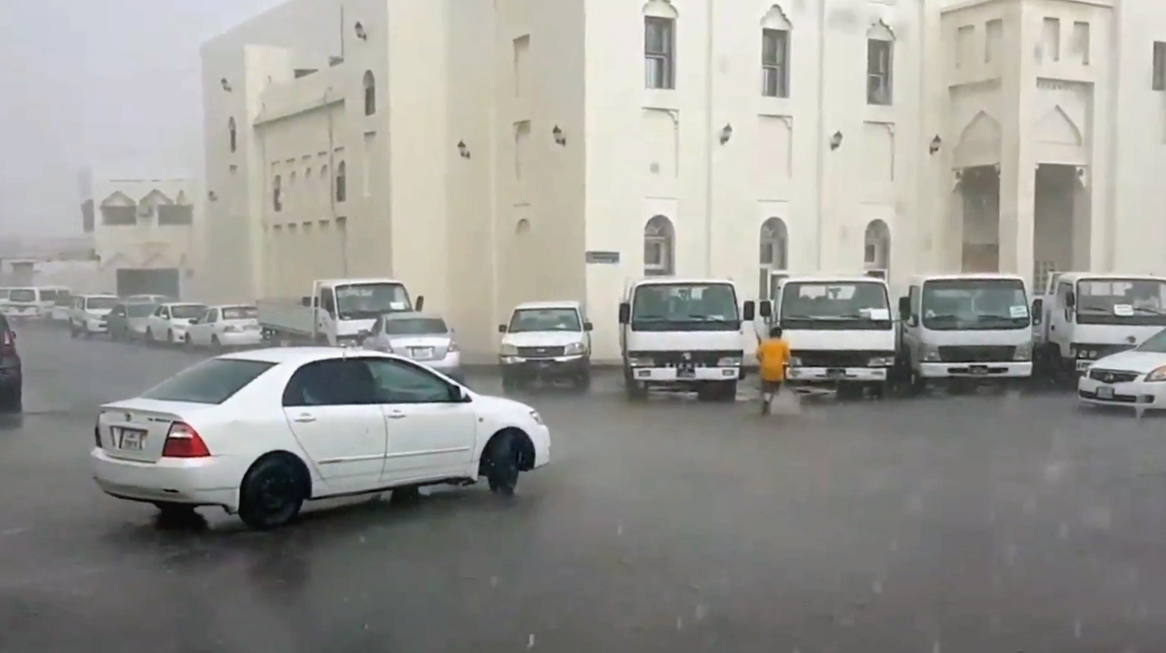
Al Fidaa Street in Madinat Khalifa South

The Traffic Department is headquartered in between Madinat Khalifa South and Madinat Khalifa North. Geographically, it is in Madinat Khalifa South, although the Ministry of Municipality and Environment lists its address as Madinat Khalifa North. In May 2013, a new headquarters for the Traffic Department, equipped with 106 counters, was established across the street from the old building.

Four parks are located here:

- Madinat Khalifa Park on Al Makhzoumi Street.
- Al Marroona Park was inaugurated in 1982 and is located on Ibn Sireen Street. Spanning an area of 11,173 m^{2}, the park has limited facilities and only hosts seven tree species.
- Al Huwaila Park, located on Khalifa School Street, was established in 2005 over an area 11,172 m^{2}. Primarily catering to families, the park contains a playground, basketball court and shaded seating. Over 25 species of trees can be observed in the park.
- Al Yousufiya Park on Sahat Al Ghafat Street.

== Health ==
Indian company Parco Healthcare opened a health center in the district in March 2016. Kayyali Group Clinic on Jassim bin Hamad Street is the district's second clinic. Al Arabi X-Ray and Medical Lab Center is the district's only medical laboratory. The two dental clinics in the area are the Lebanese Qatar Dental Speciality Complex on Al Jazira Al Arabiya Street and The Queen Dental Center on Al Idreesi Street.

== Religion ==
There are 17 public mosques in the district. Religious instruction is provided through the Islamic Da'wa and Guidance Center on Al Jazira Al Arabiya Street.

== Education ==
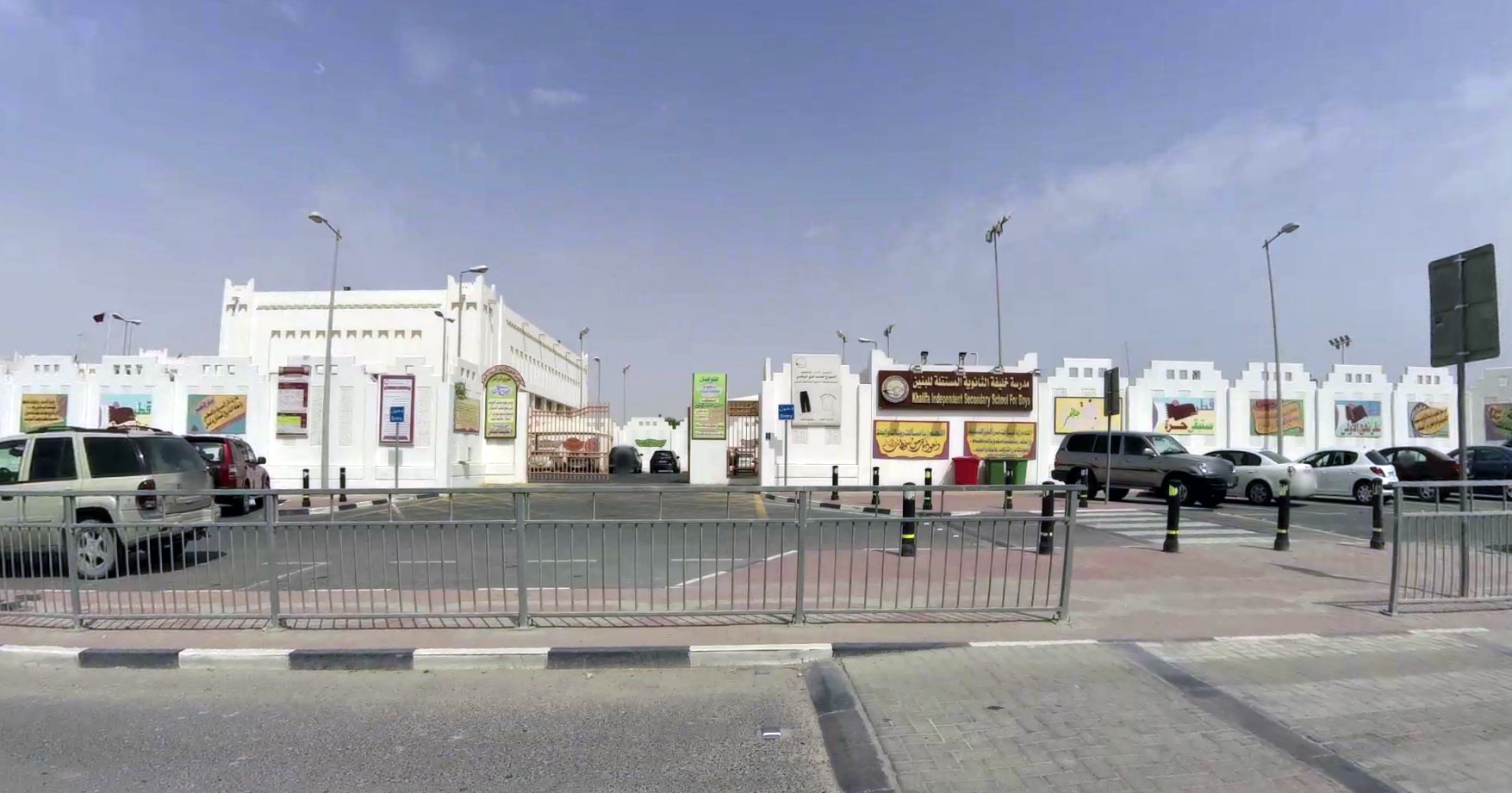
Khalifa Independent Secondary School for Boys in Madinat Khalifa South

The following schools are located in Madinat Khalifa South:

Name of School	Curriculum	Grade	Genders	Official Website	Ref
Khalifa Independent Secondary School for Boys	Independent	Secondary	Male-only	N/A	
Qatar Primary Independent School for Girls	Independent	Kindergarten – Primary	Female-only	N/A	

== Transport ==
Mowasalat is the official transport company in Qatar and serves the community through its operation of public bus routes. Madinat Khalifa South is served by three bus lines, all of which depart from Al Ghanim Bus Station. Route 55 has stops at Fereej Bin Omran and Madinat Khalifa South and a terminus at Madinat Khalifa Bus Stop near the Immigration Department, running at a frequency of every 30 minutes on all days of the week. Route 56 has stops at Rumeilah Hospital and Madinat Khalifa South and a terminus at New Al Gharrafa, also running at frequency of every 30 minutes on all days of the week. Route 156 also has stops at Rumeilah Hospital and Madinat Khalifa South but has a terminus at Al Kharaitiyat Bus Station, and likewise runs at a frequency of every 30 minutes on all days of the week.

Major roads that run through the district are Al Jazira Al Arabiya Street, Jassim Bin Hamad Street, 22 February Street, and Khalifa Street.
