= Madinat Khalifa North =

Madinat Khalifa North مدينه خليفه الشماليه
- District
- Location within Doha Location within Qatar
- Coordinates: 25.329167°N 51.476944°E
- Country: Qatar
- Municipality: Doha
- Zone: Zone 32
- District no.: 29

Area
  - Total: 2.4 km^{2} (0.93 sq mi)

Population (2004)
  - Total: 8,246
  - Density: 3,400/km^{2} (8,900/sq mi)

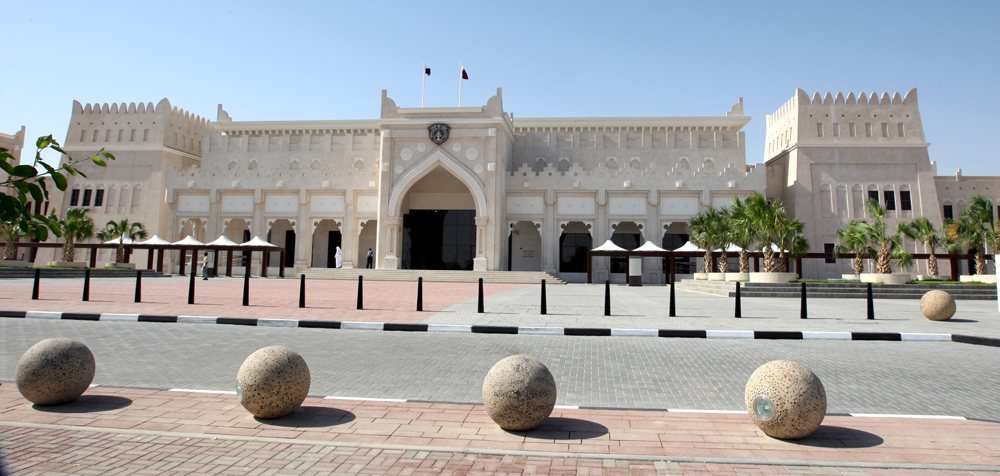
The Traffic Department on Khalifa Street.

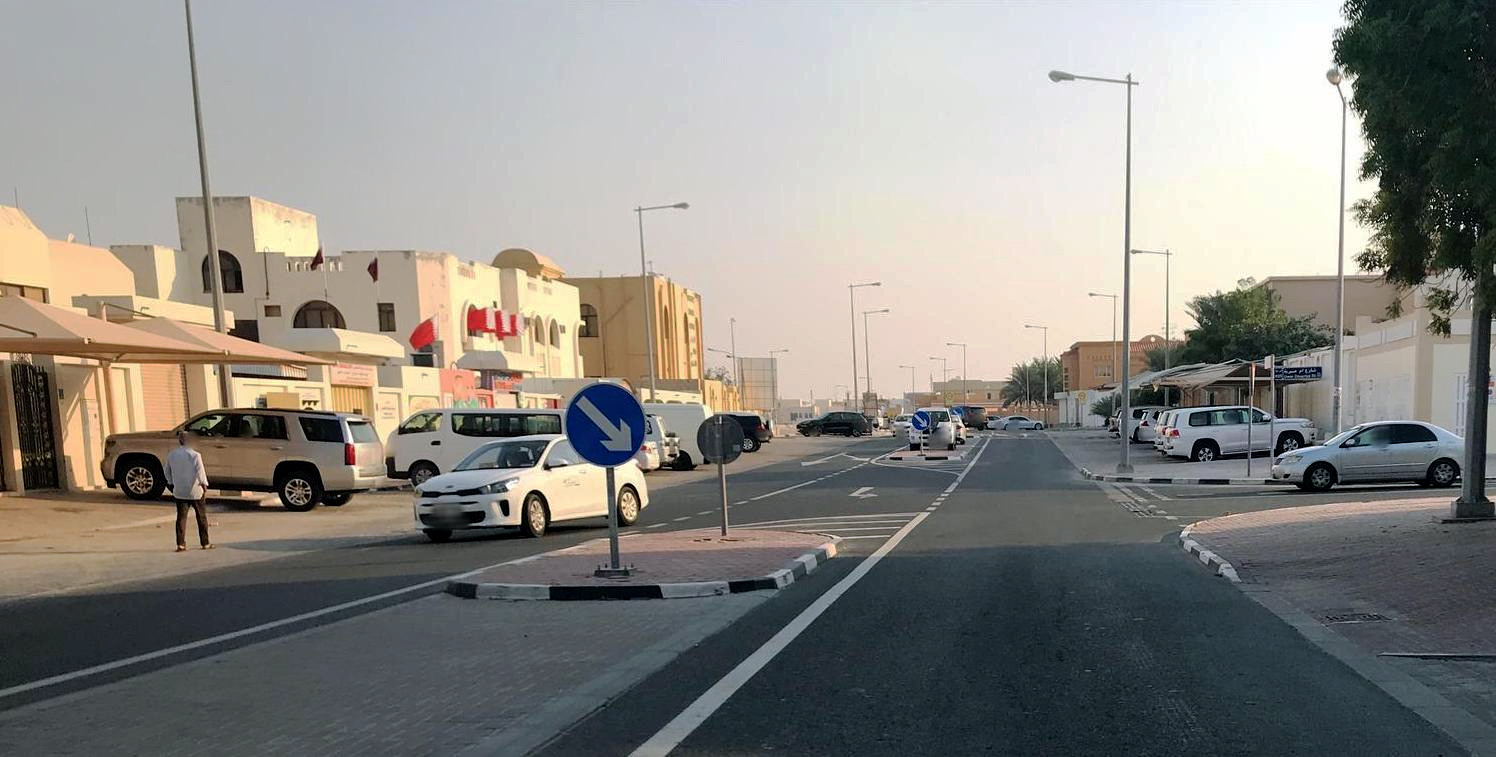
Al Taif Street in Madinat Khalifa North.

Madinat Khalifa North (Arabic: مدينه خليفه الشماليه, romanized: Madīnat Khalīfah ash Shamālīyah) is a north-western district of Doha, Qatar. It is one of the two sections of Madinat Khalifa, the other being Madinat Khalifa South. The district was developed in the 1970s by the Emir of Qatar at the time, Sheikh Khalifa bin Hamad Al Thani, primarily to serve as a residential district for Qatari families.

The district is situated between the city of Al Rayyan and downtown Doha.

== Etymology ==
In Arabic, madinat means "city". The second part of the name was received from Khalifa bin Hamad Al Thani, who was emir of Qatar from 1972 to 1995 and who oversaw the district's development. Finally, the "north" component was added to the name to differentiate it from the Madinat Khalifa South district.

== Landmarks ==
- Madinat Khalifa Health Center on Al Najda Street.
- Qatar College of Technology (Men's Section) on Al Karaana Street.
- Al Meera Supercenter on Al Deebel Street.
- Q-Post branch on Al Deebel Street.
- Al Ghariya Park on Omar bin Maabad Street.
- North Khalifa City Park on Al Rajaa Street.
- Fereej Madinat Khalifa North Stadium (managed by the Qatar Olympic Committee) on Al Nashamiya Street.
- International Centre for Sport Security on Al Markhiya Street.
- The Traffic Department on Khalifa Street. Geographically, it is in Madinat Khalifa South, although the Ministry of Municipality and Environment lists its address as Madinat Khalifa North.

== Transport ==
Currently, the underground Madinat Khalifa North Metro Station is under construction, having been launched during Phase 2A. Once completed, it will be part of Doha Metro's Green Line. It is to the west of the Madinat Khalifa Metro Station.

== Education ==
The following schools are located in Madinat Khalifa North:

Name of School	Curriculum	Grade	Genders	Official Website	Ref
Al Naman Kindergarten	Independent	Kindergarten	Both	N/A	
Compass International School - Madinat Khalifa North branch	International	Primary – Secondary	Both	Official website	
