= As Salatah =

As Salatah السلطة
- District
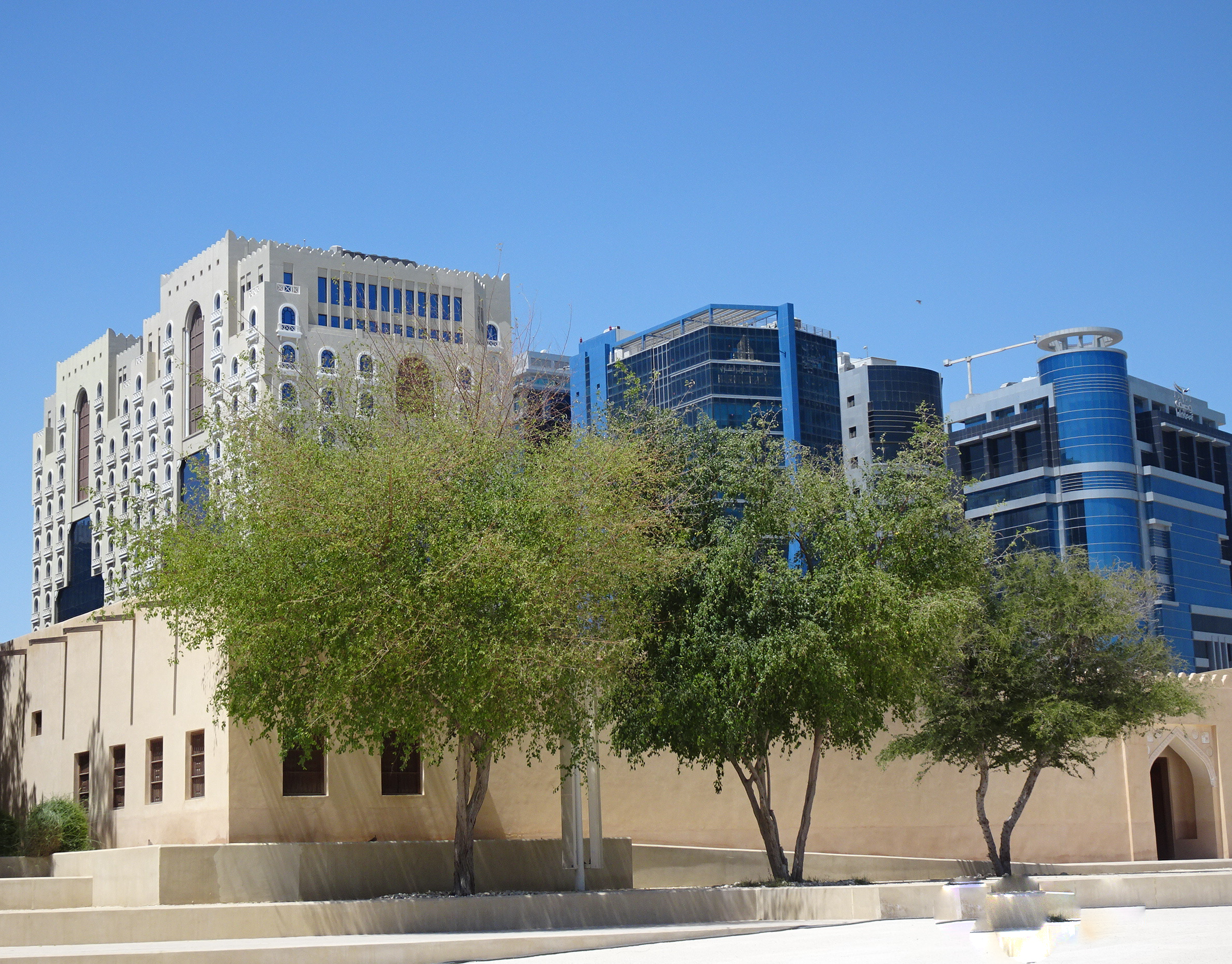
- Part of the National Museum of Qatar with the skyline of Old Salata in the background

- Location within Doha Location within Qatar
- Coordinates: 25.2846°N 51.5463°E
- Country: Qatar
- Municipality: Doha
- Zone: Zone 18
- District no.: 16

Area
  - Total: 0.4 km^{2} (0.15 sq mi)

As Salatah (Arabic: السلطة; also known as Old Al Salata) is a district in Qatar, located in the municipality of Doha. It is primarily a commercial district located near Hamad International Airport. In the 1970s, as part of a master plan for Doha prepared by Llewelyn Davies, the whole district was redeveloped in a push to modernize the cityscape. The Civil Aviation Authority and the National Museum of Qatar are located in the district.

== Etymology ==
The district was named after the Sulaiti tribe, who owned large plots of land in the area.

== History ==
The former ruler of Qatar, sheikh Jassim bin Mohammed Al Thani, selected the area as the seat of government in the early 1900s due to its close proximity to the sea and ease of access for vessels. The seat was later transferred to central Doha in 1923.

== Historic landmarks ==
=== Al Sulaiti House ===
Constructed around the mid-20th century, it was one of the most sizable buildings in the district at the time it was inaugurated. It was later renovated in order to house the Qatar Folkloric Troupe. The building is rectangular in shape and encloses a large courtyard. After its renovation, the traditional roof was replaced with a concrete one.

== See also ==
- As Salatah al Jadidah (New Al Salata)

== Gallery ==
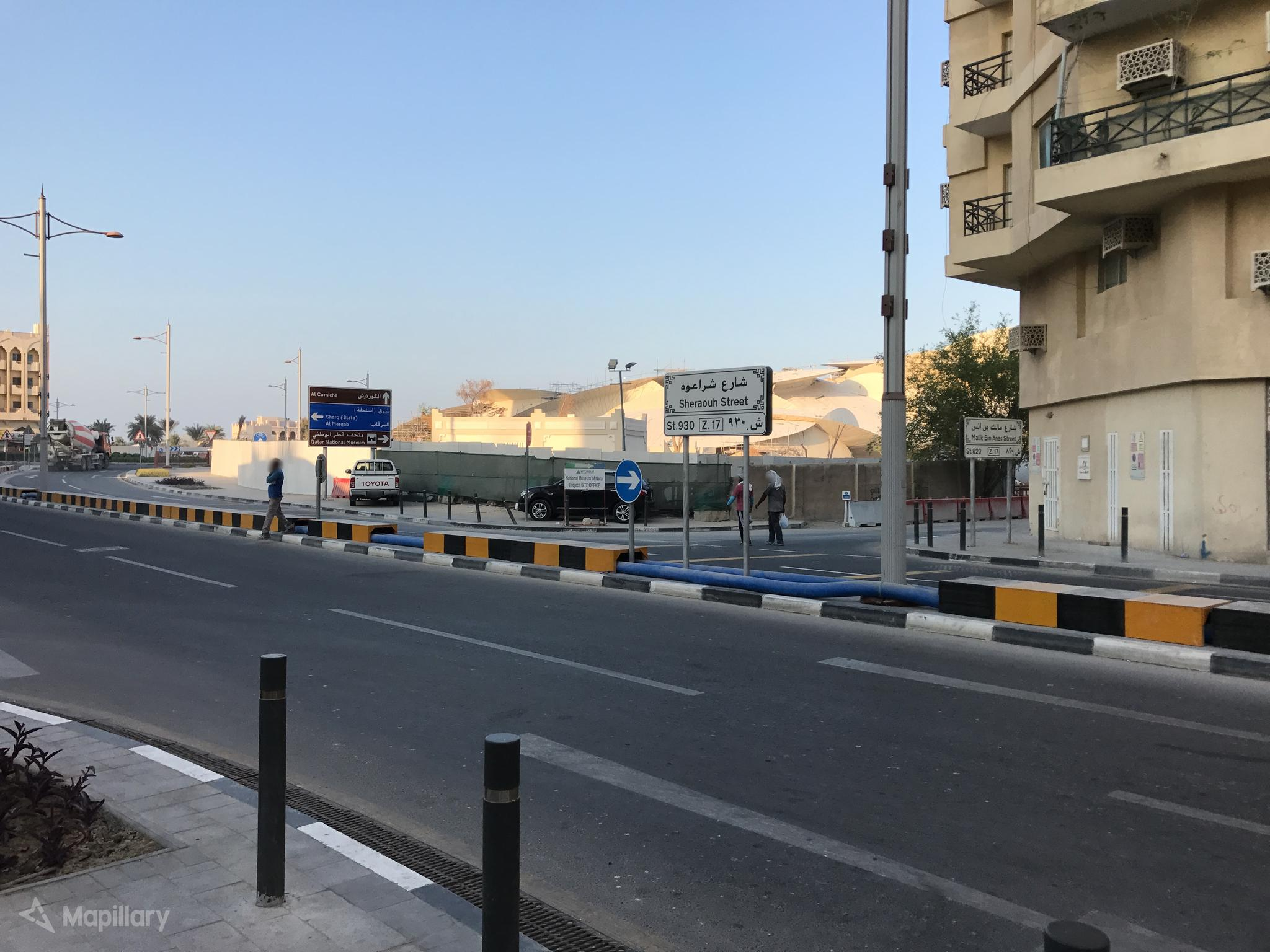
National Museum of Qatar and Sheraouh Street in Old Salata. The district's borders start at the National Museum.

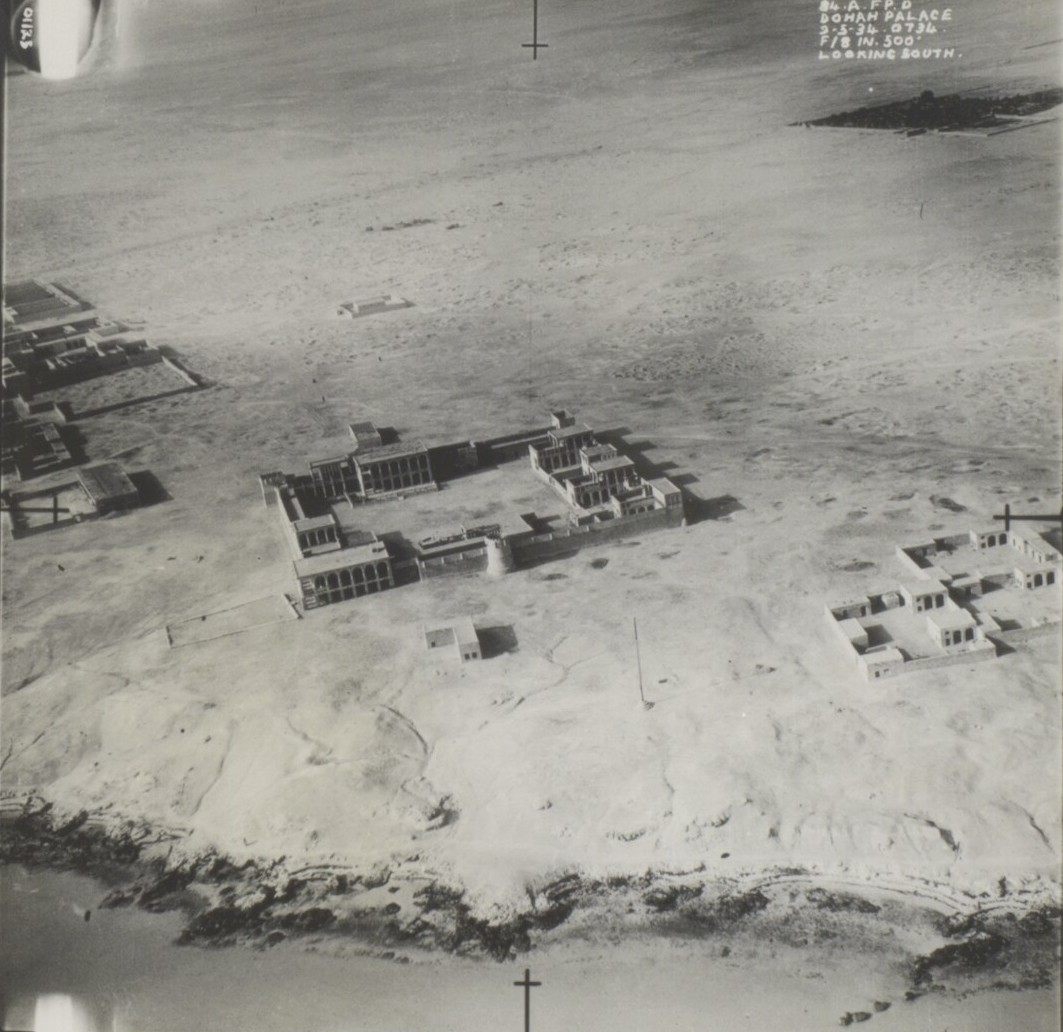
"Dohah Palace looking south", photographed by the Royal Air Force during a reconnaissance of the Qatar Peninsula in 1934
