= Ad Dawhah al Jadidah =

Ad Dawhah al Jadidah الدوحة الجديدة
- District
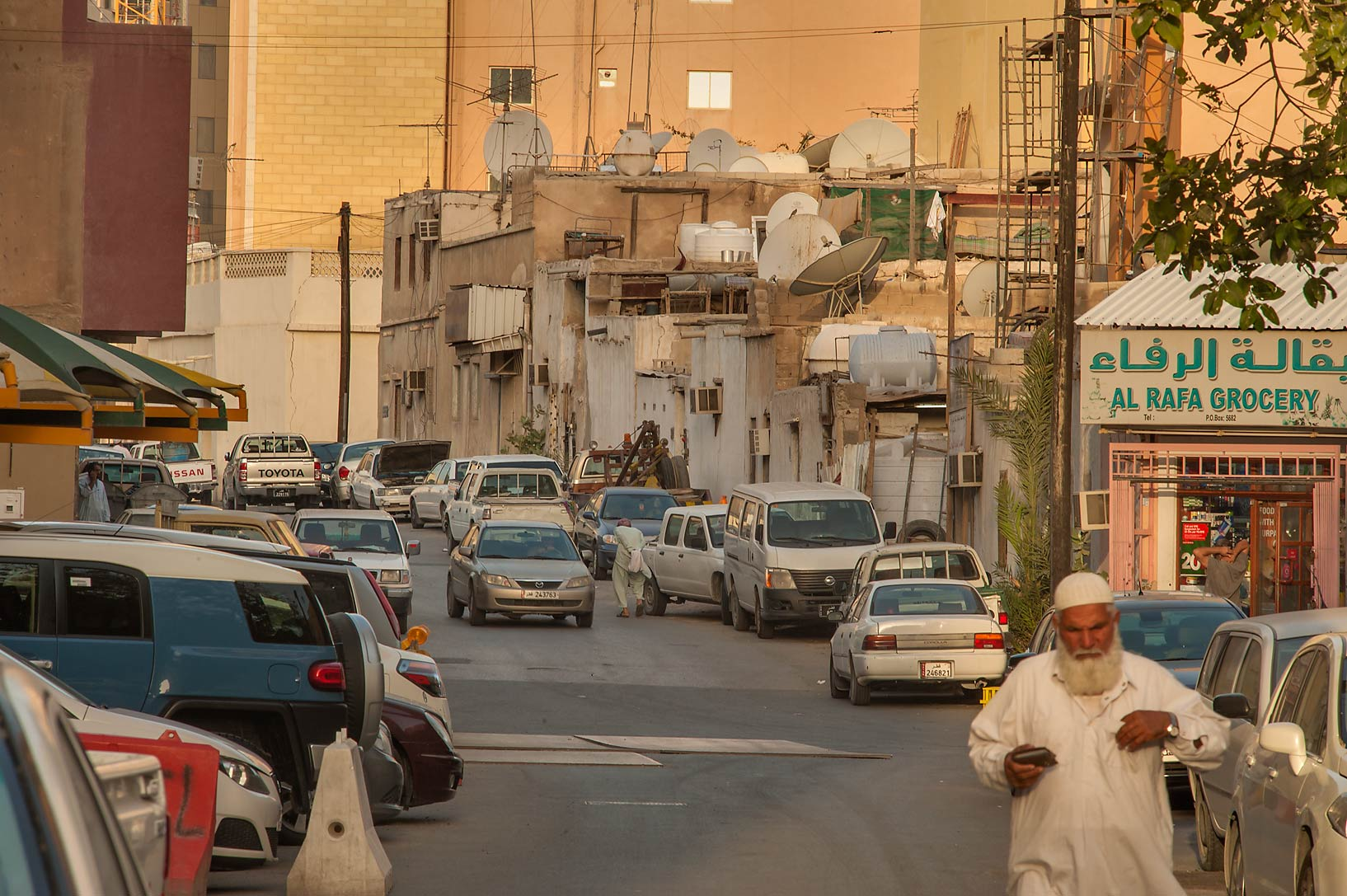
- Muaath Bin Jabal Street in Ad Dawhah al Jadidah

- Location in Qatar Ad Dawhah al Jadidah (Qatar)
- Coordinates: 25°16′33″N 51°32′1″E
- Country: Qatar
- Municipality: Doha
- Zone: Zone 15
- District no.: 13

Area
  - Total: 0.19 sq mi (0.5 km^{2})

Population (2010)
  - Total: 13,059

Ad Dawhah al Jadidah (Arabic: الدوحة الجديدة) is a district in Qatar, located in the municipality of Doha. It is bordered to the north by Mushayrib, Fereej Al Asmakh and Barahat Al Jufairi, to the east by Old Al Ghanim, to the south by Najma and Fereej Bin Durham, and to the west by Fereej Abdel Aziz.

It is primarily a residential district with several compounds and apartment blocks such as Adam Residence, Jaidah Housing, Al Madinah Suites, Al Sultan Tower, Jumeirah Furnished Apartments, and New Doha Residential Complex.

== Geography ==
Ad Dawhah al Jadidah borders the following districts:

- Fereej Bin Durham & Najma to the south, separated by B Ring Road.
- Rawdat Al Khail to the southwest, separated by the B Ring Road-Rawdat Al Khail Street Intersection.
- Fereej Abdel Aziz to the west, separated by Rawdat Al Khail Street.
- Mushayrib and Al Asmakh to the north, separated by Ahmed Bin Mohammed Bin Thani Street.
- Old Al Ghanim to the east, separated by Airport Street.

== Landmarks ==
- Al Hilal Building on Al Dhahran Street.
- Al Mansour Plaza Hotel on B Ring Road.
- Olympic Sports on Al Matar Street.

== Transport ==
Major roads that run through the district are Ahmed Bin Mohammed Bin Thani Street, Airport Street, Rawdat Al Khail Street and B Ring Road.

=== Doha Metro ===
Entrance to Al Doha Al Jadeeda station.

The underground Al Doha Al Jadeda station currently serves the Red Line of the Doha Metro. As part of the metro's Phase 1, the station was inaugurated on 8 May, 2019, along with all other Red Line stations. It is located at the intersection of B Ring Road and Airport Street.

Among the station's facilities are a Commercial Bank ATM, a prayer room and restrooms. Nearby landmarks within walking distance include the Crowne Plaza, Holiday Inn and Concorde Hotel. There are a total of four metrolinks, which is the Doha Metro's feeder bus network, servicing the station:

- M112, which serves Ad Dawhah al Jadidah.
- M113, which serves Old Al Ghanim.
- M114, which serves Umm Ghuwailina.
- M115, which serves Najma and Fereej Bin Durham.

== Demographics ==
As of the 2010 census, the settlement comprised 4,115 housing units and 334 establishments. There were 13,059 people living in the settlement, of which 83% were male and 17% were female. Out of the 13,059 inhabitants, 88% were 20 years of age or older and 12% were under the age of 20. The literacy rate stood at 93.5%.

Employed persons made up 80% of the total population. Females accounted for 6% of the working population, while males accounted for 94% of the working population.

Year	Population
1986	7,698
1997	8,129
2004	8,038
2010	13,059
