= Al Doha Al Jadeda station =

Metro station in Doha, Qatar

Al Doha Al Jadeda Metro Station
- Station

General information
- Location: Ad Dawhah Al Jadidah; Qatar
- Coordinates: 25.275218°N 51.539802°E
- Owner: Qatar Rail
- Operator: Doha Metro
- Platforms: 1
- Connections: MetroLink Bus

Construction
- Structure type: Underground
- Accessible: Yes

Other information
- Website: http://www.qr.com.qa/

History
- Opened: 8 May 2019

Services
Preceding station	Doha Metro	Following station
Msheireb towards Lusail	Red Line	Umm Ghuwailina towards Al Wakra
Location

Al Doha Al Jadeda station of the Doha Metro's Red Line is in the Qatari capital Doha. It is Located in the Ad Dawhah al Jadidah District in Doha, Qatar

== History ==
As part of the Doha Metro's phase 1, the station was inaugurated on 8 May 2019, along with most other Red Line stations.

== Station details ==
Among the station's facilities are a Commercial Bank ATM, a prayer room and restrooms. Nearby landmarks within walking distance include the Crowne Plaza, Holiday Inn and Concorde Hotel.

== MetroLink Bus ==
There are a total of four metrolinks, which is the Doha Metro's feeder bus network, servicing the station:

- M112, which serves Ad Dawhah al Jadidah.
- M113, which serves Old Al Ghanim.
- M114, which serves Umm Ghuwailina.
- M115, which serves Najma and Fereej Bin Durham.
