= Fereej Al Asmakh =

Fereej Al Asmakh فريج عبد العزيز
- District
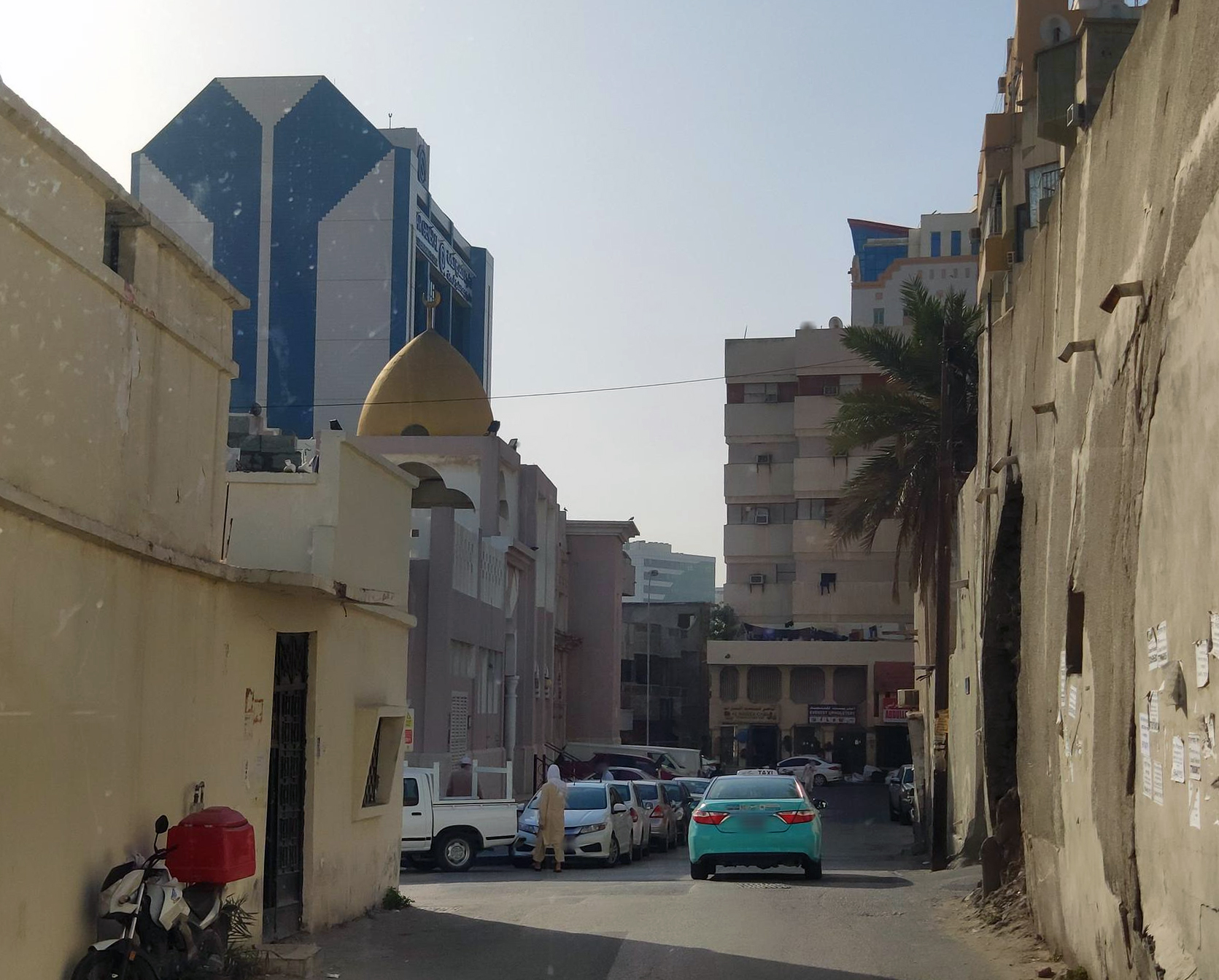
- Al Maamoun Street in Fereej Al Asmakh

- Location within Doha Location within Qatar
- Coordinates: 25.280442°N 51.533298°E
- Country: Qatar
- Municipality: Doha
- Zone: Zone 5
- District no.: 7

Area
  - Total: 0.77 km^{2} (0.30 sq mi)

Fereej Al Asmakh (Arabic: فريج الأصمخ, romanized: Farīj al-'Aṣmakh) is a Qatari district located in the municipality of Doha. Administratively, it is part of Zone 5, along with Al Najada and Barahat Al Jufairi.

It is one of the smaller and older districts of Doha. As such, the district is considered a good example of Qatar's cultural identity, which has led to several development programs by the government to rehabilitate its dilapidated structures.

== Etymology ==
In Arabic, fereej translates to "neighborhood", while the Al-Asmakh portion of the name refers to one of the area's first major landowners.

== History ==
Fereej Al Asmakh is one of Doha's oldest districts, containing architecture characteristic of Qatari urban life in the first half of the 20th century. As part of the Doha Central District development project, the Public Works Authority (Ashghal) has undertaken a large-scale restoration program to preserve and rehabilitate the area, beginning in 2024. The initiative, divided into three zones, includes the conservation of historic structures such as Doha Palace, Amna bint Wahab School, Sheikh Fahad's Palace, the Cultural Gallery, and several traditional residences and mosques.

The project incorporates traditional construction techniques, such as wooden beams and palm fronds for roofing, alongside modern reinforcements to ensure durability. Streets and alleys have been repaved with granite, and open squares have been enhanced with new lighting and landscaping. Located adjacent to tourist attractions such as Souq Waqif, Al Najada, and Msheireb Downtown Doha, the district is intended to serve as a similarly-themed tourist destination.
