= Al Najada =

Al Najada النجادة
- District
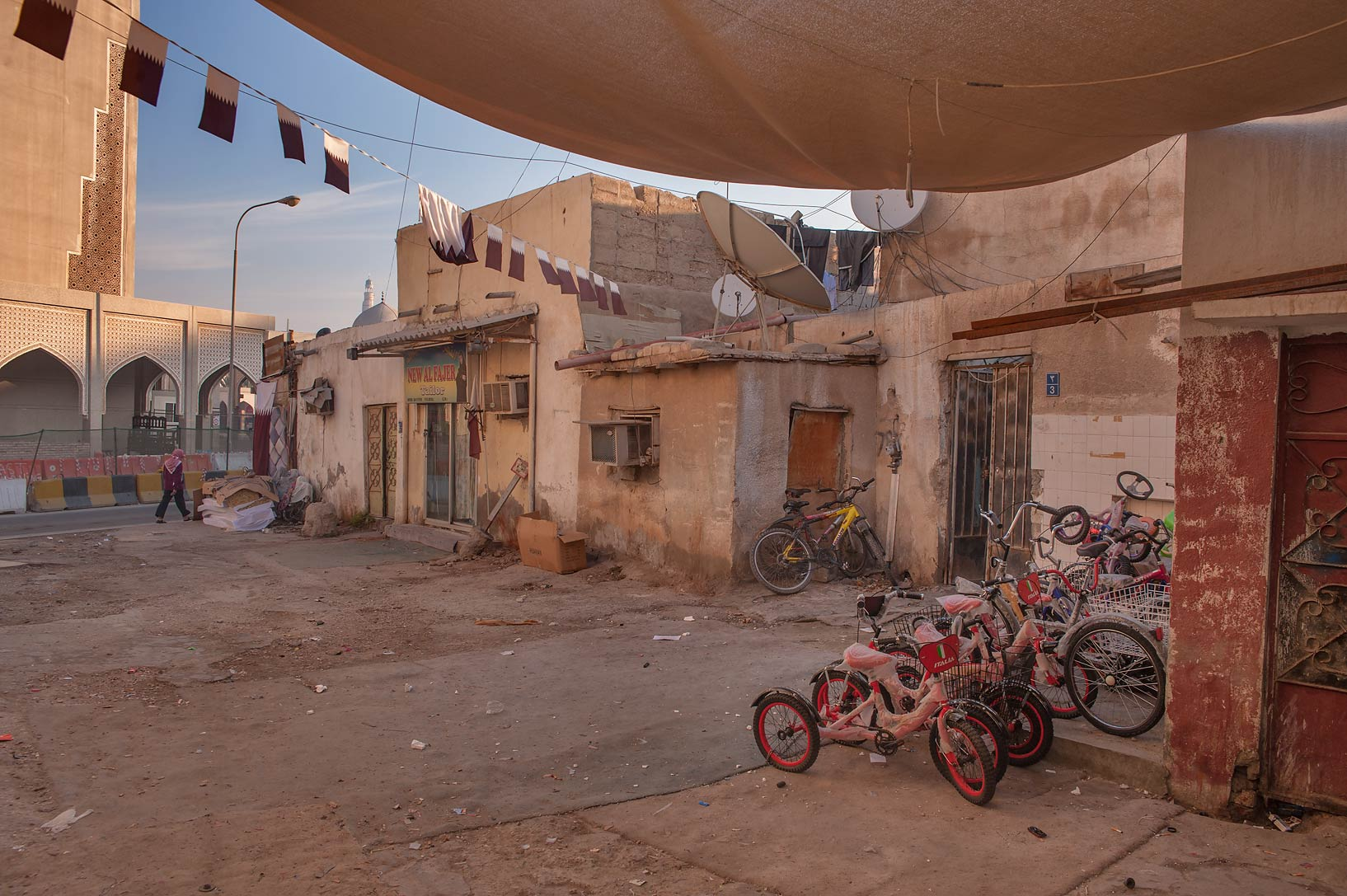
- Sikkat Al Ihsan Street in Al Najada

- Location within Doha Location within Qatar
- Coordinates: 25°17′N 51°31.8′E
- Country: Qatar
- Municipality: Doha
- Zone: Zone 5
- District no.: 5

Area
  - Total: 0.05 km^{2} (0.019 sq mi)

Al Najada (Arabic: النجادة, romanized: An-Najādah) is a Qatari district in the municipality of Doha. It is one of the oldest districts of Doha. Doha's rapid urbanization during the 1970s after it gained independence resulted in the gradual decline of Al Najada. Several of its historical buildings have been demolished.

The Qatar Museums Authority has taken steps to preserve the cultural and architectural heritage of the district with its 'Al Turath al Hai' ('living heritage') initiative. Most significant structures dating back to the early 20th century that still exist have been documented by the Origins of Doha Project. Some of the contemporary buildings dating to the late 20th century were intentionally designed with traditional elements of Qatari architecture in the interests of preserving the district's identity.

== Etymology ==
The name Al Najada is thought to be derived from the term describing the people of the Najd, the place of origin of its original residents.

== Geography ==
Al Najada borders the following districts:

- Barahat Al Jufairi to the south, separated by Barahat Al Jufairi Street.
- Old Al Ghanim to the east, separated by Grand Hamad Street.
- Al Jasrah to the north, separated by Ali Bin Abdullah Street.
- Mushayrib to the west.

== Landmarks ==
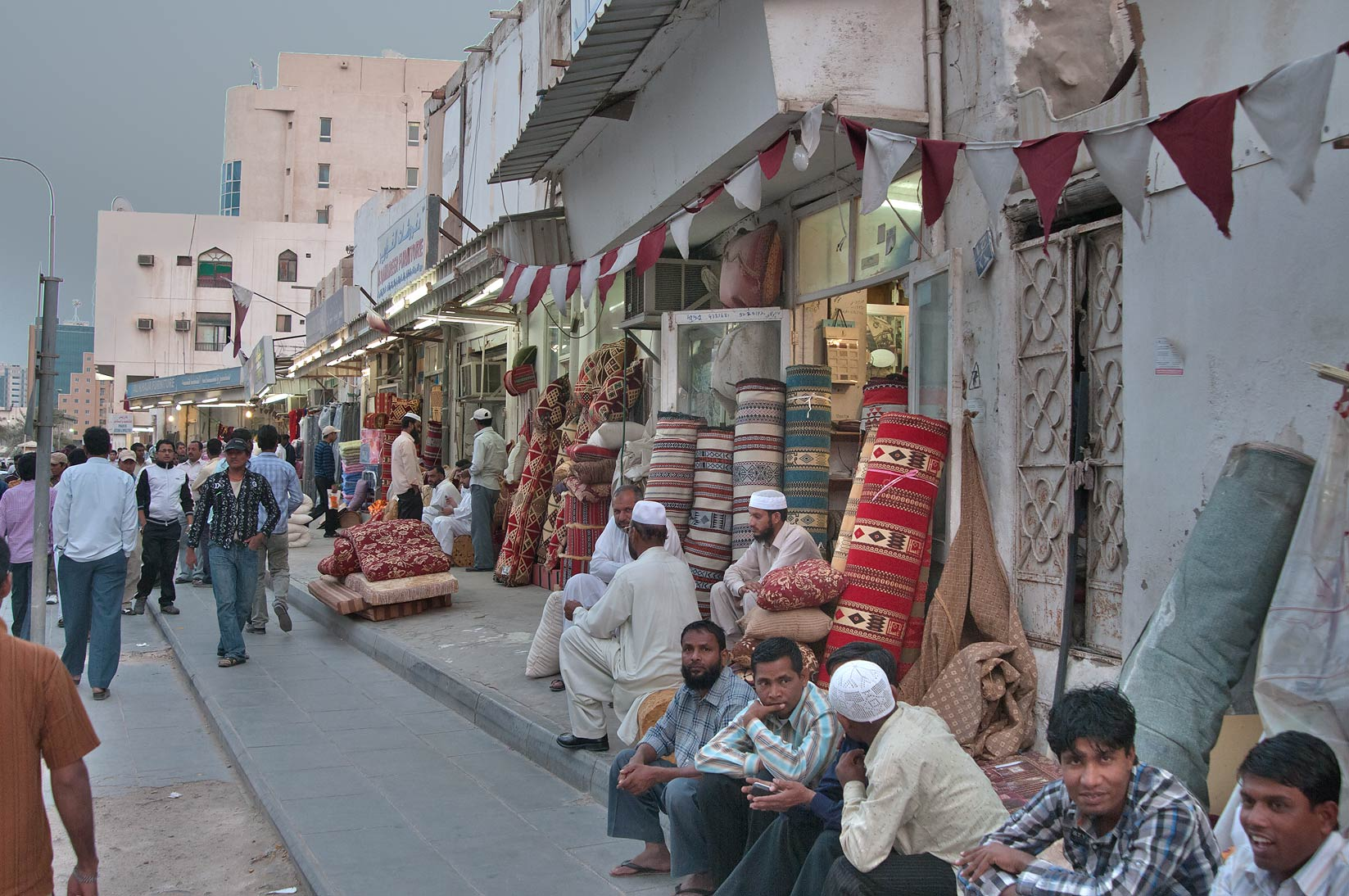
Shops at Souq Najada

=== Najada Souq ===
Najada Souq, also known as the Mobile Phone Souq, was closed in 2012. It was announced in 2017 that the souq would re-open. A gold market containing 50 shops was inaugurated in the refurbished Najada Souq in July 2018. The new souq has an underground parking lot with 250 spaces.

=== Sikkat Al Ihsan ===
Sikkat Al Ihsan is a tapered street that connects Al Maymoun Street and Barahat Al Jufairi Street. Most of the residential units on this street are old, likely dating to the early 20th century, and provide good examples of vernacular architecture in Doha. Because of its long and mostly-undisturbed history, Sikkat Al Ihsan is considered a significant historic site of interest.

=== Windtower house ===
Windtowers are structures built to direct airflow in buildings. In the past, they were a common occurrence in Qatar, however, the rapid modernization of Doha has seen all other windtowers in the city demolished, leaving Al Najada's windtower as the last surviving one in Qatar's capital. Situated inside the Najada Souq complex, the house once served as an ethnographic museum but has since been closed to the public.
