= Al Mansoura (Doha) =

Al Mansoura المنصورة
- District
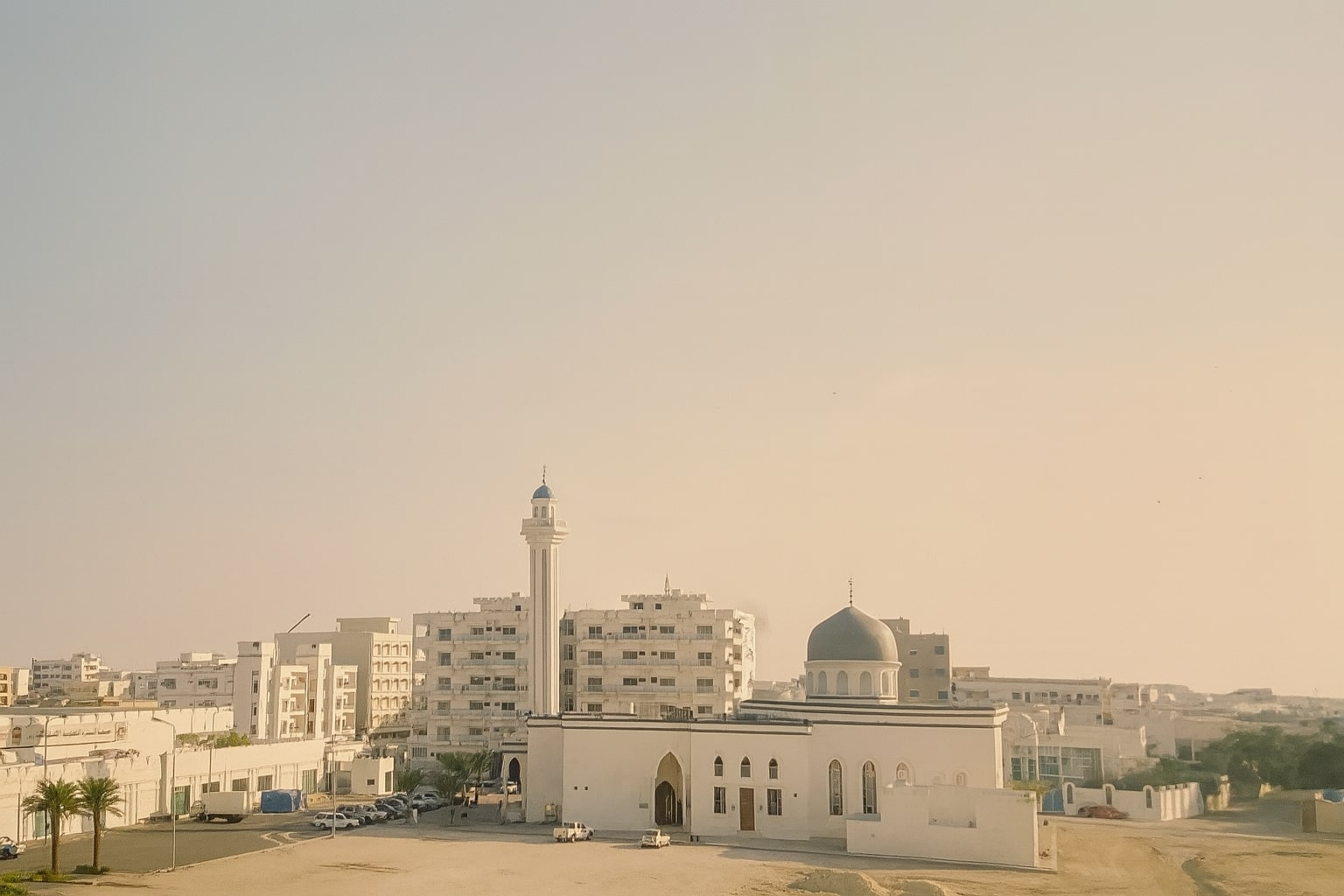
- Ghanem Ali Abdullah Qassem Al Thani Mosque in 2001

- Location within Doha Location within Qatar
- Coordinates: 25.2693°N 51.5295°E
- Country: Qatar
- Municipality: Doha
- Zone: Zone 25
- District no.: 21

Area
  - Total: 0.8 km^{2} (0.31 sq mi)

Al Mansoura (Arabic: المنصورة, romanized: Al-Manṣūrah) is a Qatari district in the municipality of Doha. Together with Fereej Bin Durham, it makes up Zone 25 which has a population of 37,082.

Since the 2010s, the district has seen a significant increase in expatriate workers residing here. Furthermore, it has gained a reputation as an affordable commercial and activity hub.

== Geography ==
Al Mansoura borders the following districts:

- Nuaija to the south, separated by C Ring Road.
- Rawdat Al Khail to the west, separated by Rawdat Al Khail Street.
- Fereej Bin Durham to the north, separated by Al Mansoura Street.
- Najma to the east, separated by Najma Street.

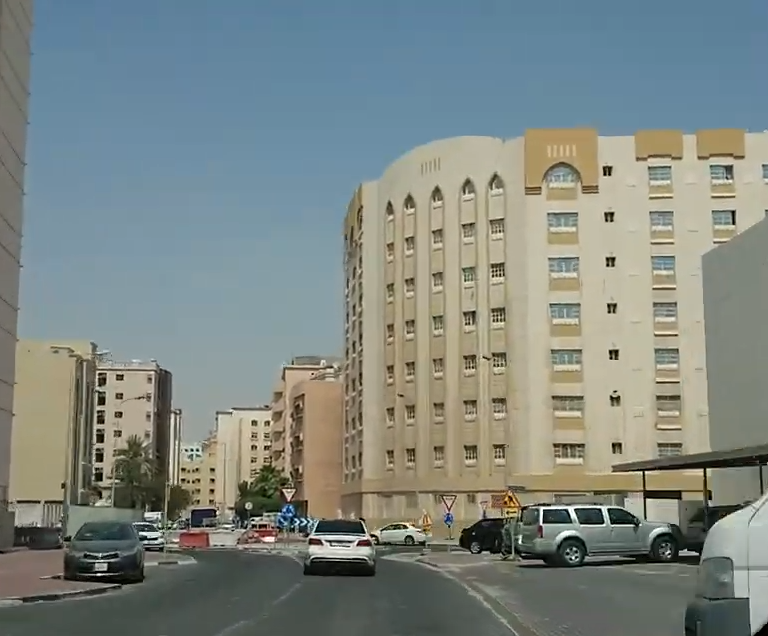
View of apartment buildings and a roundabout in Al Mansoura

== Transport ==
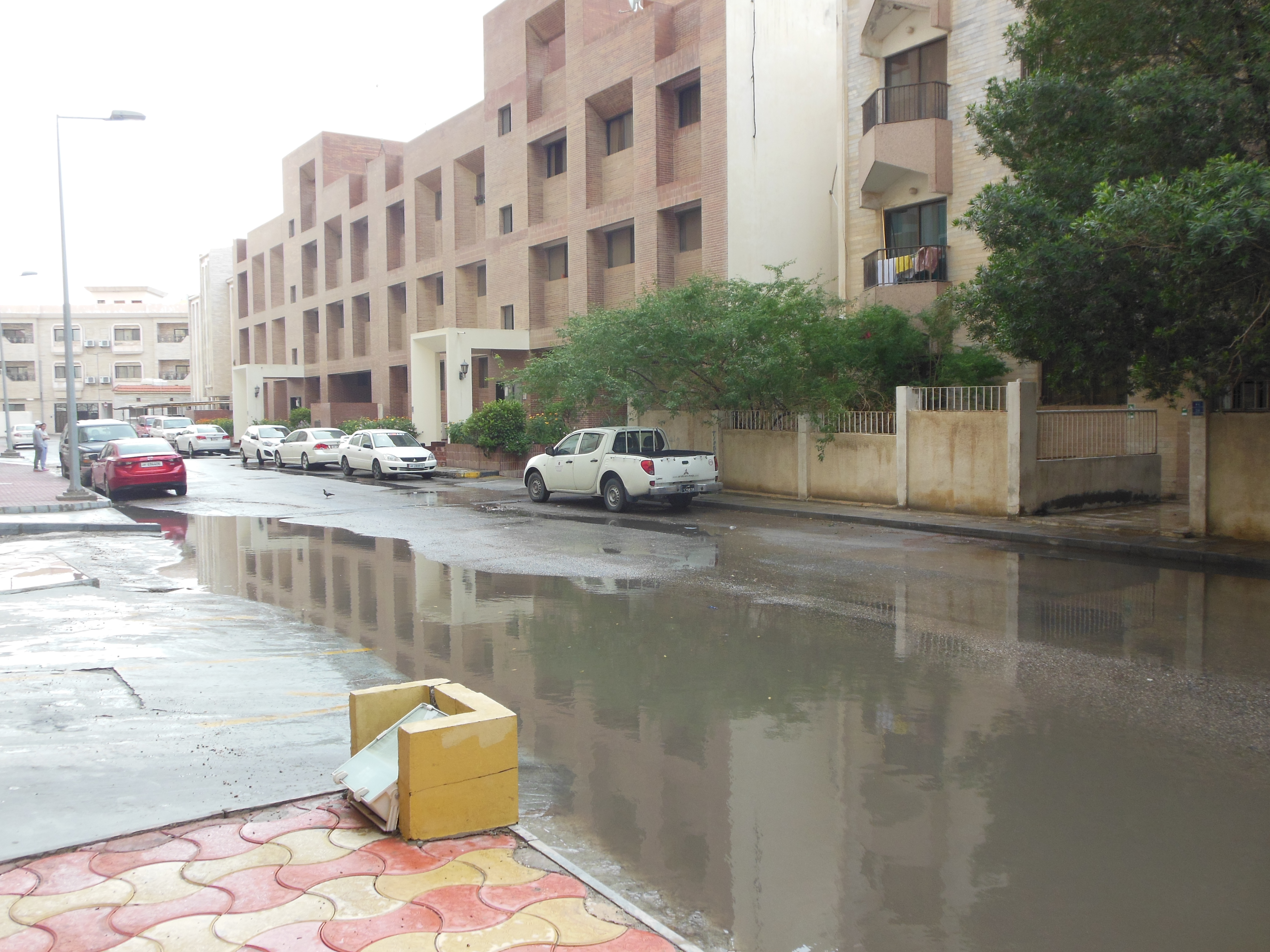
Apartment blocks in Al Mansoura

=== Road ===
Mowasalat is the official transport company in Qatar and serves the community through its operation of public bus routes. Al Mansoura is served by four bus lines, two of which depart from Al Ghanim Bus Station and two of which depart at the Asian Town Bus Station.

Route 10 has stops at Najma and Al Mansoura and a terminus at Al Thumama at Bus Stop 5, running at a frequency of every 30 minutes on all days of the week. Route 12 has stops at Al Mansoura, the Medical Commission and the Religious Complex and a terminus at the New Workers Clinic in Barwa City, also running at frequency of every 30 minutes on all days of the week. Route 301C has stops at the Religious Complex, Al Mansoura and Villaggio Mall and a terminus at Karwa Bus Station, also running at frequency of every 30 minutes on all days of the week. Finally, route 304C is identical to route 301C except for having its stops in a reverse order.

Rail Al mansoura has a metro station on the green line of the metro.

== Education ==
The following school is located in Al Mansoura:

Name of School	Curriculum	Grade	Genders	Official Website	Ref
Independence School for Boys	Independent	Primary – Secondary	Male-only	N/A	
Pearling Season International School	British	Primary - Secondary	Male & Female	https://www.psisd.sch.qa/	
