= Zone 25, Qatar =

Zone 25
- Zone
- Interactive map of Zone 25
- Coordinates: 25.269257°N 51.531184°E
- Country: Qatar
- Municipality: Doha
- Blocks: 115

Area
  - Total: 1.5 km^{2} (0.58 sq mi)

Population
  - Total: 37,082 (2,015)
- Time zone: UTC+03 (Arabia Standard Time)
- ISO 3166 code: QA-DA

Zone 25 is a zone of the municipality of Doha in Qatar. The main districts recorded in the 2015 population census were Fereej Bin Durham and Al Mansoura.

Since the 2010s, the zone has seen a significant increase in expatriate workers residing here. Furthermore, it has gained a reputation as an affordable commercial and activity hub.

== Demographics ==
Year	Population
1986	10,658
1997	14,074
2004	19,024
2010	31,573
2015	37,082

== Land use ==
The Ministry of Municipality and Environment (MME) breaks down land use in the zone as follows.

Area (km^{2})	Developed land (km^{2})	Undeveloped land (km^{2})	Residential (km^{2})	Commercial/ Industrial (km^{2})	Education/ Health (km^{2})	Farming/ Green areas (km^{2})	Other uses (km^{2})
1.49	1.01	0.48	0.66	0.08	0.04	0.00	0.23
