= Zone 5, Qatar =

Zone 5
- Zone
- Interactive map of Zone 5
- Coordinates: 25.283005°N 51.533734°E
- Country: Qatar
- Municipality: Doha
- Blocks: 26

Area
  - Total: 0.22 km^{2} (0.085 sq mi)

Population (2015)
  - Total: 2,086
  - Density: 9,500/km^{2} (25,000/sq mi)
- Time zone: UTC+03 (Arabia Standard Time)
- ISO 3166 code: QA-DA

Zone 5 is a zone of the municipality of Doha in the state of Qatar. The main districts recorded in the 2015 population census were Al Najada, Barahat Al Jufairi, and Fereej Al Asmakh.

== Demographics ==
Year	Population
1986	3,030
1997	3,546
2004	3,175
2010	4,138
2015	2,086

== Land use ==
The Ministry of Municipality and Environment (MME) breaks down land use in the zone as follows.

Area (km^{2})	Developed land (km^{2})	Undeveloped land (km^{2})	Residential (km^{2})	Commercial/ Industrial (km^{2})	Education/ Health (km^{2})	Farming/ Green areas (km^{2})	Other uses (km^{2})
0.22	0.13	0.09	0.03	0.02	0.00	0.00	0.08
