= Fereej Abdel Aziz =

Fereej Abdel Aziz فريج عبد العزيز
- District
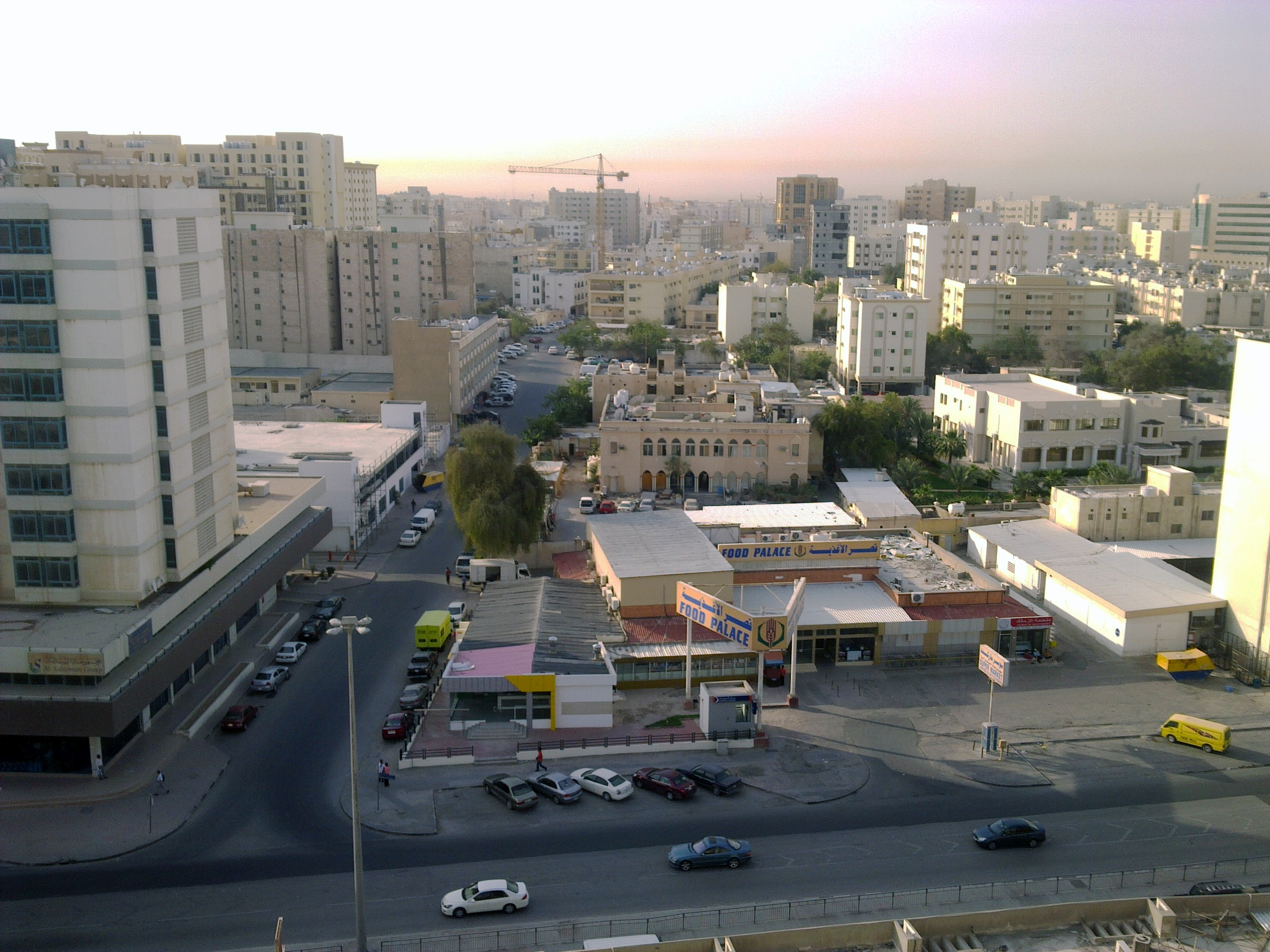

- Location within Doha Location within Qatar
- Coordinates: 25°16′41″N 51°31′27″E
- Country: Qatar
- Municipality: Doha
- Zone: Zone 14
- District no.: 12

Area
  - Total: 0.5 km^{2} (0.19 sq mi)

Population (2010)
  - Total: 10,808
  - Density: 22,000/km^{2} (56,000/sq mi)

Fereej Abdel Aziz (Arabic: فريج عبد العزيز, romanized: Farīq ‘Abd al ‘Azīz) is a Qatari district located in the municipality of Doha.

== Etymology ==
Fereej, the first constituent of the district's name, translates to "neighborhood" in English. The second part of the name, Abdel Aziz, was given after its namesake who was a sheikh that resided in and governed the area.

== Transport ==
Major roads that run through the district include Wadi Mushaireb Street, Mohammed Bin Thani Street, Rawdat Al Khail Street and B Ring Road.

== Demographics ==
As of the 2010 census, the district comprised 2,401 housing units and 309 establishments. There were 10,808 people living in the district, of which 78% were male and 22% were female. Out of the 10,808 inhabitants, 87% were 20 years of age or older and 13% were under the age of 20. The literacy rate stood at 93.4%.

Employed persons made up 78% of the total population. Females accounted for 9% of the working population, while males accounted for 91% of the working population.
