= Umm Ghuwailina =

Umm Ghuwailina أم غويلينة
- District
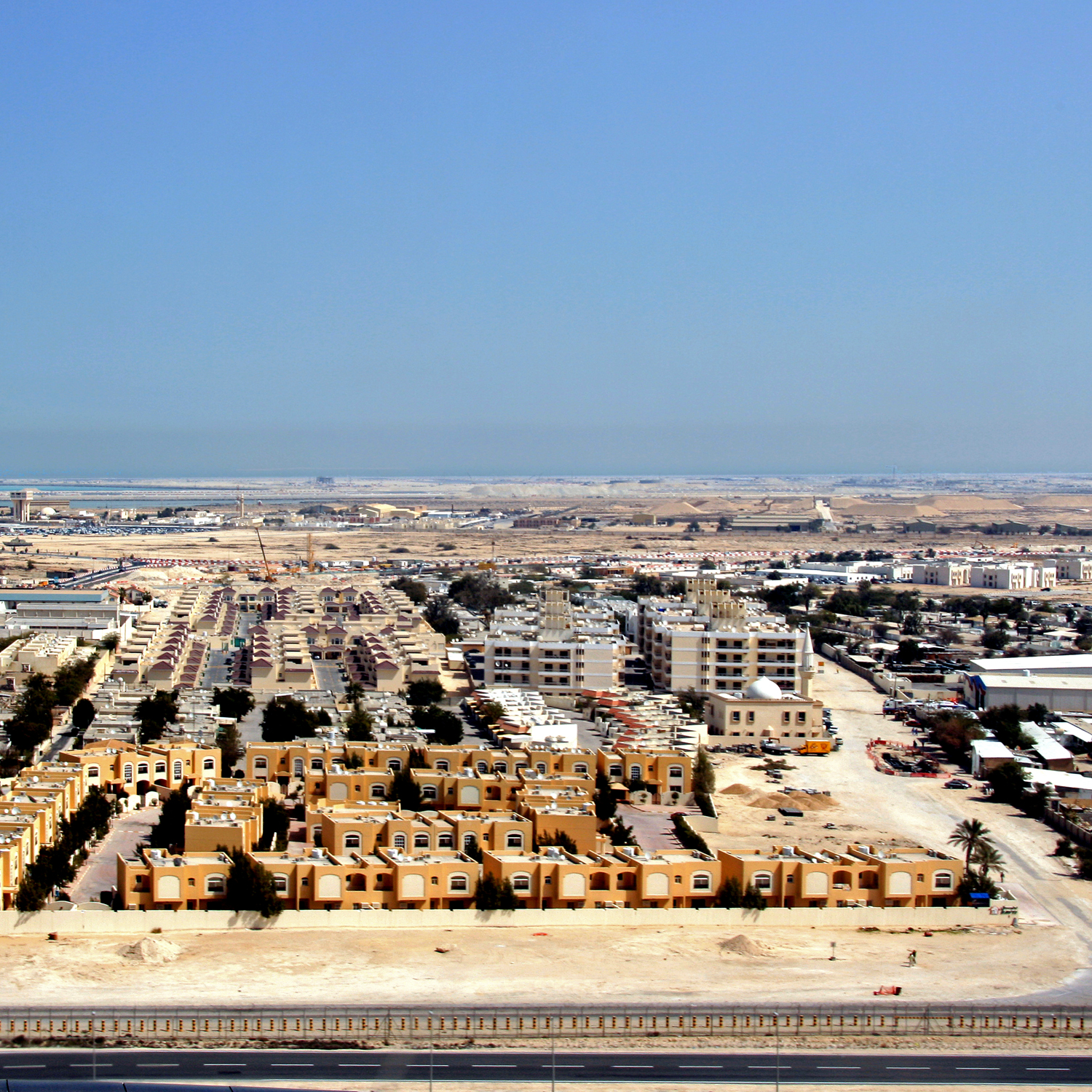
- Umm Ghuwailina in 2008

- Location within Doha Location within Qatar
- Coordinates: 25.275825°N 51.545898°E
- Country: Qatar
- Municipality: Doha
- Zone: Zone 27
- District no.: 24

Area
  - Total: 1.4 km^{2} (0.54 sq mi)
- Elevation: 13 m (43 ft)

Population
  - Total: 26,069
  - Density: 19,000/km^{2} (48,000/sq mi)

Umm Ghuwailina (Arabic: أم غويلينة, romanized: Umm Ghuwaylīnah) is a district in Qatar, located in the municipality of Doha.

== Etymology ==
The first word of Umm Ghuwailina is Arabic for "mother" and is used as a prefix to denote a geographic feature, while ghuwailina is a derivative of the name of a tree known locally as "ghulan". Hence, the area's name translates literally to "the mother of ghulan". The tree held local significance for its use as camel fodder.

According to Qatar's Geographic Information System, there are seven other geographic features with the name Umm Ghuwailina, including the village of Umm Ghuwailina in Al-Shahaniya Municipality.

== Landmarks ==
- Umm Ghuwailina Health Centre on Simaisma Street.
- Al Arab Newspaper on C Ring Road.
- Qatar Airways office on C Ring Road.
- Sheikh Ali Bin Abdulla Al Thani Library on B Ring Road.
- Research and Study Center of the Ministry of Awqaf and Islamic Affairs on B Ring Road.
- Capital Security Department of the Ministry of Interior on B Ring Road.
- Umm Ghuwailina Environmental Health Office on Umm Ghuwailina Street.
- Doha Toy Town Amusement Park, the first indoor amusement park in the country, is on Ras Abu Aboud Street.

== Qatar National Master Plan ==
The Qatar National Master Plan (QNMP) is described as a "spatial representation of the Qatar National Vision 2030". As part of the QNMP's Urban Centre plan, which aims to implement development strategies in 28 central hubs that will serve their surrounding communities, Umm Ghuwailina has been designated a District Centre, which is the lowest designation.

Umm Ghuwailina District Centre plan focuses on developing the intersection of C Ring Road and Al Matar as a large mixed-use hub. As this is where the Umm Ghuwailina Metro Station is located, pedestrian crossings will also be built along both roads. High-density highrises are also planned for both roads.

== Transport ==
Major roads that run through the district include Airport Street, Ras Abu Aboud Street, B Ring Road and C Ring Road.

=== Doha Metro ===
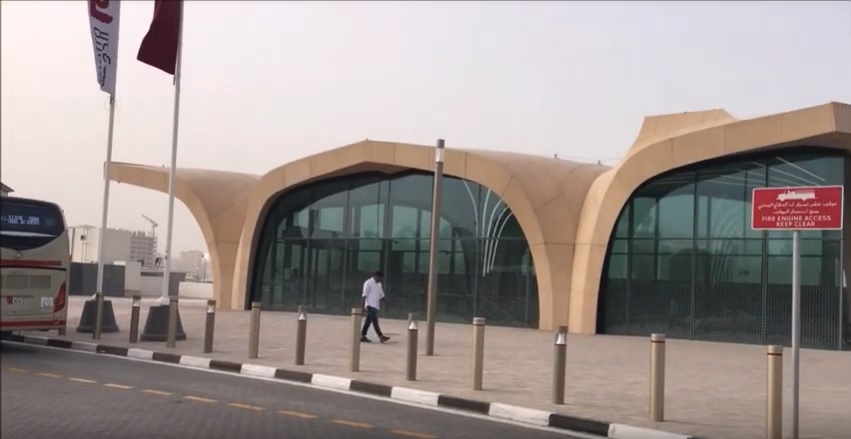
Umm Ghuwailina Metro Station in May 2019.

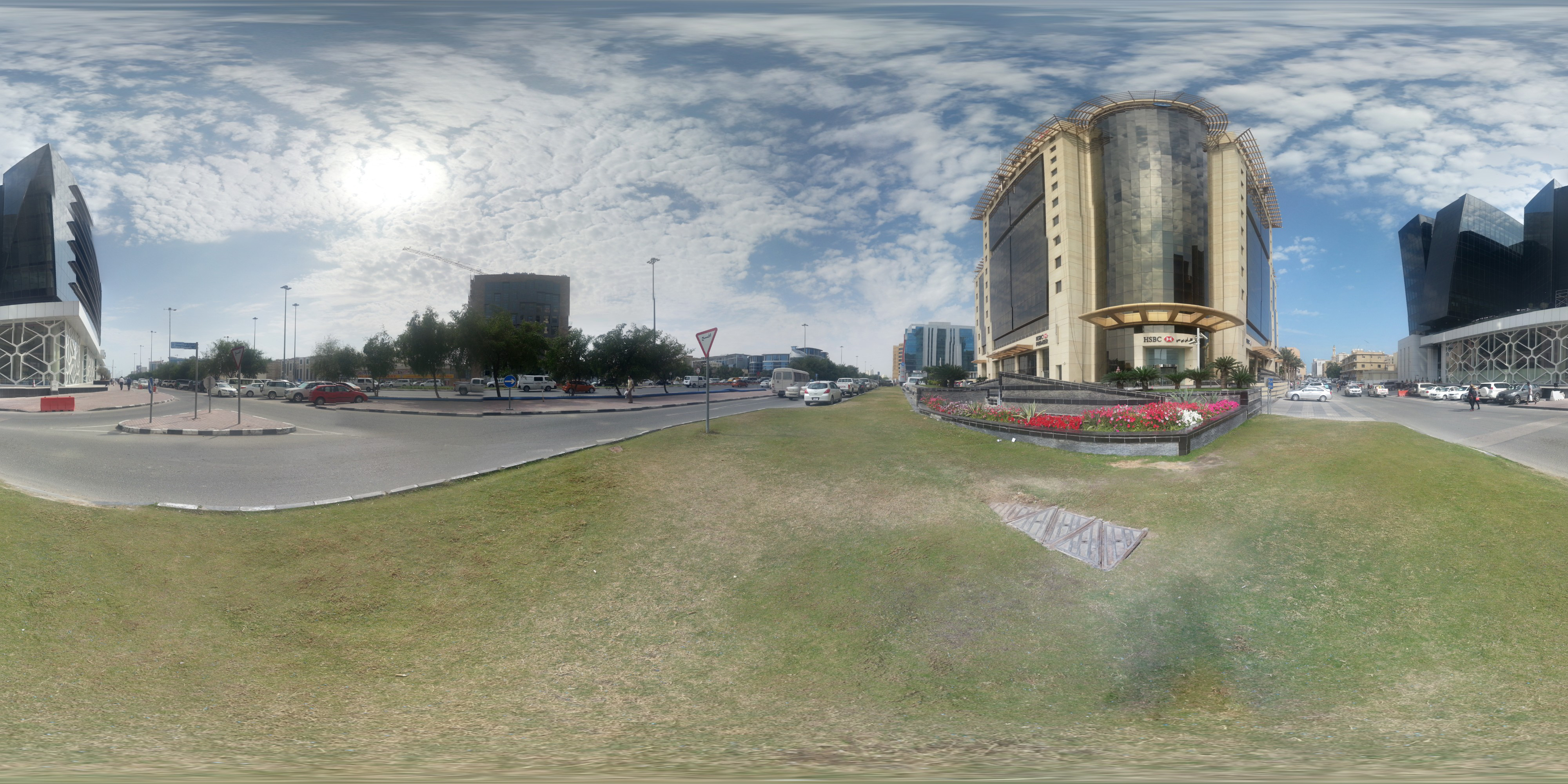
Panoramic view of Airport Street and Umm Ghuwailina Street.

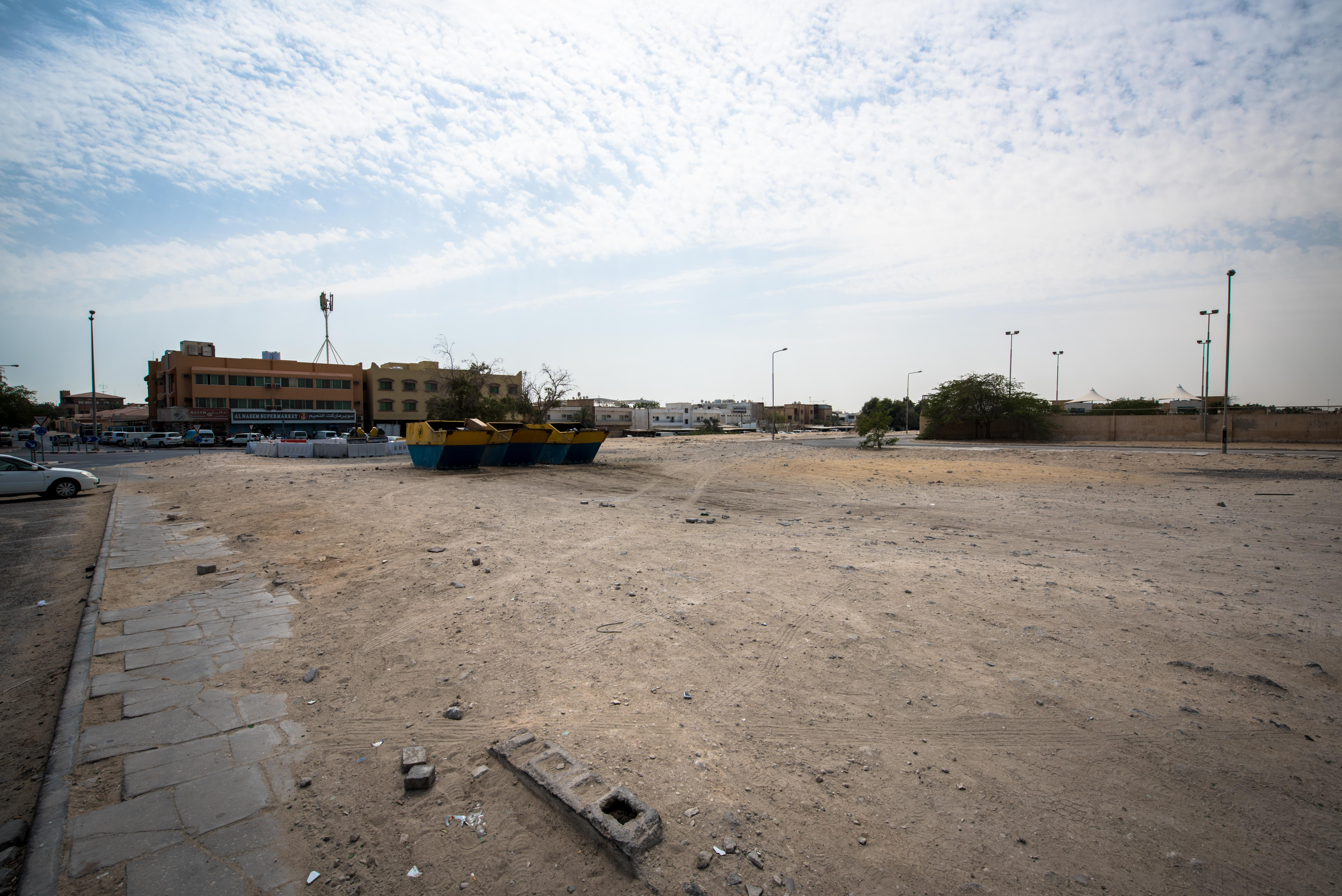
An undeveloped plot in Umm Ghuwailina.

The underground Umm Ghuwailina station currently serves the Red Line of the Doha Metro. As part of the metro's Phase 1, the station was inaugurated on 8 May 2019, along with all other Red Line stations. It is located at the intersection of C Ring Road and Airport Street.

Among the station's facilities are a Commercial Bank ATM, a prayer room and restrooms. There are a total of four metrolinks, which is the Doha Metro's feeder bus network, servicing the station:

- M116, which serves Umm Ghuwailina. The VIP Hotel is a popular destination on this route.
- M117, which serves Al Mansoura and Najma. Al Meera Supermarket is a popular destination on this route.
- M118, which serves Al Mansoura and Najma. Holiday Villa and Residence Doha are popular destinations on this route.
- M139, which serves Al Hilal and Nuaija. Al Emadi Financial Square is a popular destination on this route.

== Demographics ==
As of the 2010 census, the district comprised 6,340 housing units and 607 establishments. There were 26,069 people living in the district, of which 75% were male and 25% were female. Out of the 679 inhabitants, 82% were 20 years of age or older and 18% were under the age of 20. The literacy rate stood at 96.4%.

Employed persons made up 71% of the total population. Females accounted for 10% of the working population, while males accounted for 90% of the working population.

Year	Population
1986	13,226
1997	14,022
2004	19,345
2010	26,069

== Education ==
The following school is based in Umm Ghuwailina:

Name of School	Curriculum	Grade	Genders	Official Website	Ref
Al Qudus Model Boys School	Independent	Primary	Male-only	N/A	

In June 2019, in a collaboration between several government ministries, the first-ever English-speaking public school was opened as The First Ihsan School. This was done to provide financially insecure families with free education options otherwise unavailable to non-Arabic speakers. The school follows the CIE curriculum.
