= Najma (Doha) =

Najma نجمة
- District
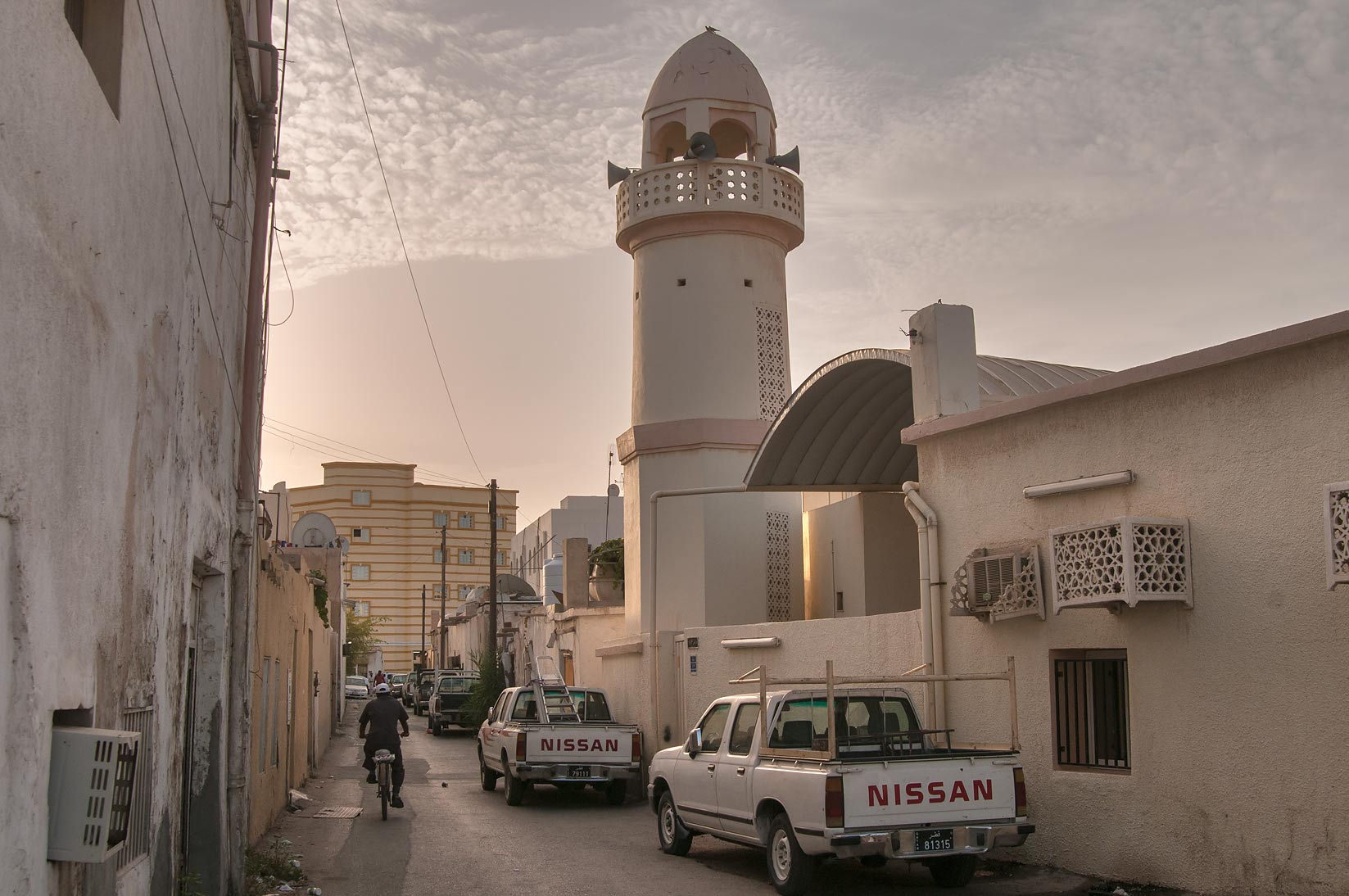
- Sikkat Al Thurayya Street in Al Najma

- Location within Doha Location within Qatar
- Coordinates: 25.269°N 51.541°E
- Country: Qatar
- Municipality: Doha
- Zone: Zone 26
- District no.: 23

Area
  - Total: 1.1 km^{2} (0.42 sq mi)

Population
  - Total: 24,763
  - Density: 23,000/km^{2} (58,000/sq mi)

Najma (Arabic: نجمة) is a Qatari district located in the municipality of Doha. Considered to be one of Doha's older districts, the bulk of Najma's commercial and office spaces are located along the arterial roads of Airport Street, C Ring Road and B Ring Road. The district is characterized by its high population density and its historic architecture, particularly the traditional courtyard houses, some of which date back to the 1960s.

Land adjacent to the Al Mansoura station, the highest-density area, is predominantly privately owned, featuring a variety of residential structures, including villas, apartments, and worker accommodations. Retail establishments also line most streets, with the commercial offerings encompassing car dealerships, lodging facilities, markets, and cinemas. A notable landmark is Souq Al Haraj, situated in the central area of the neighborhood, which serves as a focal point for local commerce. The district predominantly consists of South Asian expatriate workers and is considered a popular and affordable commercial hub.

== Landmarks ==
- Al Meera Supercenter on Airport Street.
- Al Khazem Souq on Al Mansoura Street.
- Souq Al Haraj on Al Mansoura Street.
- Labour Inspection Department of the Ministry of Labour on C Ring Road.
- QatarEnergy office on C Ring Road.
- Cinema Complex with Gulf Cinema and Doha Cinema on C Ring Road.
- Gulf Snooker Center on Al Khalidiya Street.

== Architecture ==
Architecturally, Najma is characterized by low-rise residential buildings, typically featuring commercial frontages along the main streets. The skyline is punctuated by the Toyota Tower, standing at approximately 30 metres (98 ft) tall in the southeast part of the neighborhood, marking the highest point in Najma. The overall built environment adheres to local zoning regulations set by the Ministry of Municipality and Environment, which limits commercial buildings to ground + mezzanine + 7 floors, and residential buildings to ground + 7 floors.

While buildings along the main thoroughfares are generally well-maintained, those within the local streets often show signs of deterioration. This disparity in building conditions presents challenges related to privacy and safety, particularly where main entrances are damaged or left open.

== Transport ==
Mowasalat is the official transport company in Qatar and serves the community through its operation of public bus routes. Najma is served by three bus lines, all of which depart from Al Ghanim Bus Station. Route 10 has stops at Najma and Al Mansoura and a terminus at Al Thumama at Bus Stop 5, running every 30 minutes on all days of the week. Route 11 has stops at Al Najma, Lulu Hyper Market, and Old Airport and a terminus at Al Thumama near the Supreme Education Council, running at frequency of every 20 minutes on all days of the week. Finally, route 49 is a circular route with stops at Hamad Hospital, C-Ring Road, Al Najma and D-Ring Road and a terminus at Al Ghanim Bus Station, running at a frequency of every 30 minutes on all days of the week.

Major roads that run through the district are Airport Street, Najma Street, B Ring Road, C Ring Road, and Al Mansoura Street.

== Qatar National Master Plan ==
The Qatar National Master Plan (QNMP) is described as a "spatial representation of the Qatar National Vision 2030". As part of the QNMP's Urban Centre plan, which aims to implement development strategies in 28 central hubs that will serve their surrounding communities, Najma has been designated a District Centre, which is the lowest designation.

Najma District Centre includes sections of four different zones located at the crossing of B Ring Road and Airport Street: Zone 15 (Ad Dawhah al Jadidah), Zone 16 (Old Al Ghanim), Zone 26 (Najma) and Zone 27 (Umm Ghuwailina). Somewhere from 10,000 to 15,000 residents will be situated in the District Centre, thus the plan emphasizes the construction of more high density apartment buildings. The Centre will be served by the Old Airport Metro Station on Airport Street, which is part of the Doha Metro's Red Line, and plans are in place to develop the pedestrian infrastructure around the metro station. Other objectives of the plan are to increase public services in the Najma area and to preserve the historic architecture of the area.

== Demographics ==
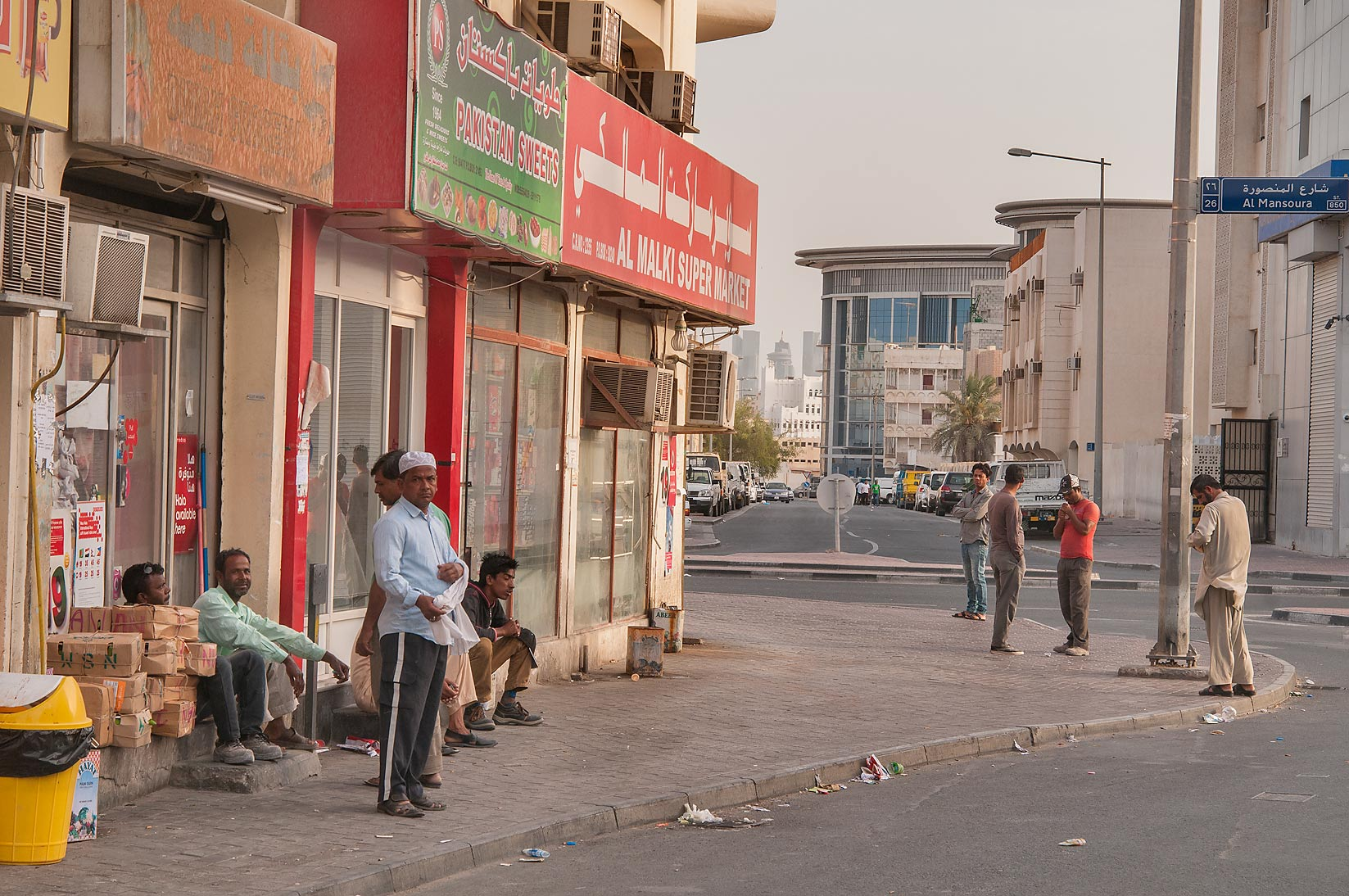
Al Mansoura Street in Najma.

As of the 2010 census, the district comprised 5,936 housing units and 1,012 establishments. There were 24,763 people living in the district, of which 73% were male and 27% were female. Out of the 24,763 inhabitants, 83% were 20 years of age or older and 17% were under the age of 20. The literacy rate stood at 96.5%.

Employed persons made up 74% of the total population. Females accounted for 14% of the working population, while males accounted for 86% of the working population.

Compared to other neighborhoods of similar geographical size in Doha, Najma exhibits a significantly higher population density. This density is reflected in its compact urban form, with a mix of residential, commercial, and community spaces often coexisting within close proximity or even within the same buildings.

Year	Population
1986	9,141
1997	10,826
2004	16,697
2010	24,763

== Education ==
The following school is located in Najma:

Name of School	Curriculum	Grade	Genders	Official Website	Ref
Ahmed Bin Hanbal Independent Secondary School for Boys	Independent	Secondary	Male-only	N/A	
