= Fereej Bin Durham =

Fereej Bin Dirham فريج بن درهم
- District
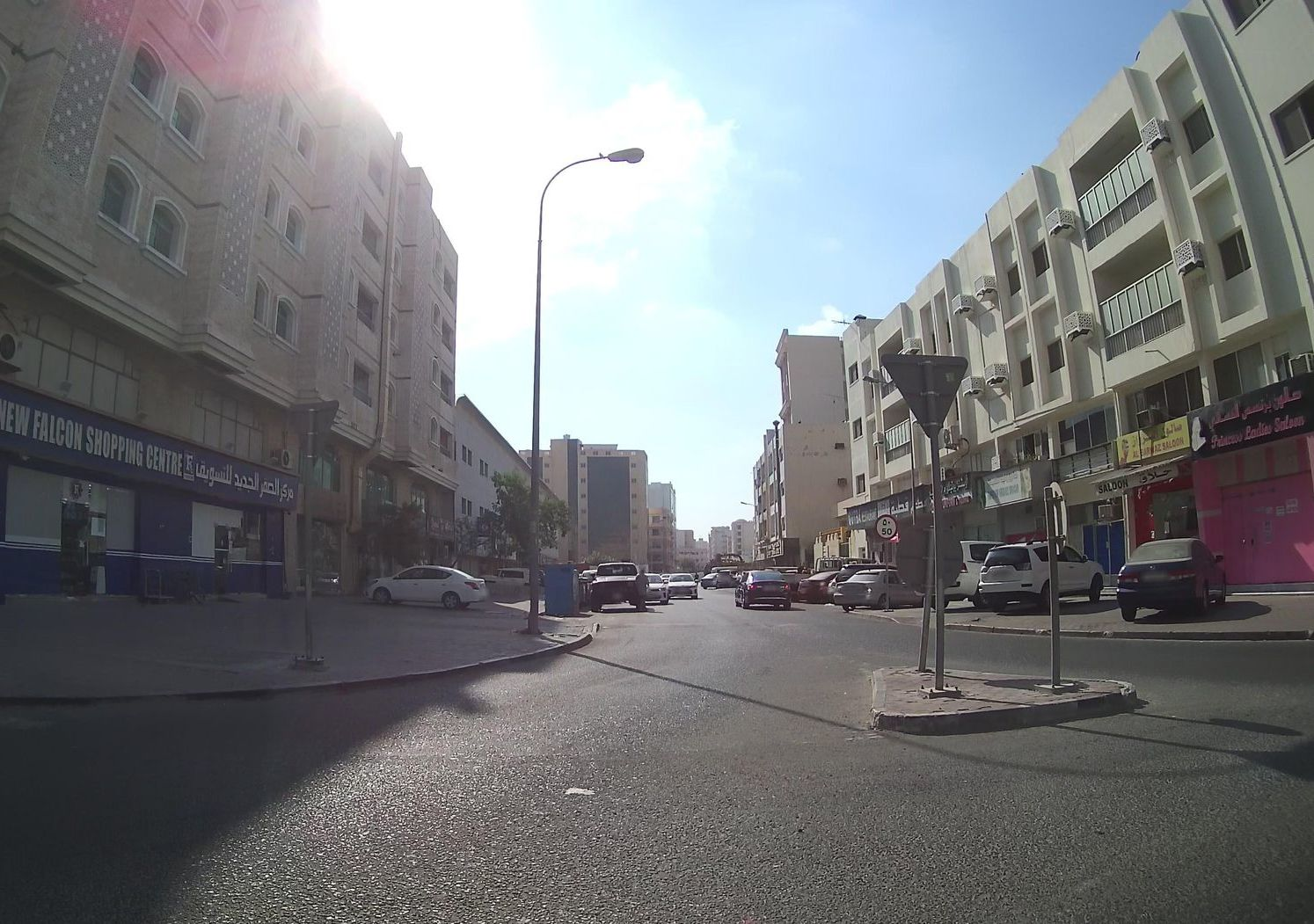
- Shops on Ibn Derham Street in Fereej Bin Durham

- Location within Doha Location within Qatar
- Coordinates: 25.2716590°N 51.5323454°E
- Country: Qatar
- Municipality: Doha
- Zone: Zone 25
- District no.: 22

Area
  - Total: 0.65 km^{2} (0.25 sq mi)

Fereej Bin Durham (Arabic: فريج بن درهم; also spelled as Fereej bin Derhem) is a Qatari district in the municipality of Doha. Together with Al Mansoura, it makes up Qatar's Zone 25, which has a population of 37,082.

The district is in close proximity to Doha's business center and logistics focal points on the east coast, such as Hamad International Airport and Grand Hamad Street, making it a popular choice for commercial operators to set up in. It is also relatively close to some of Doha's major population centers such as Mushayrib. Bin Dirham Plaza, developed by Just Real Estate, is one such major project to capitalize on Fereej Bin Durham's location, having launched as a major 7-storey office project in 2017. Since the 2010s, the district has seen a significant increase in expatriate workers, primarily from South Asia, residing here. Furthermore, along with neighboring Al Mansoura, it has gained a reputation as an affordable commercial and activity hub.

== Landmarks ==
- Ansar Gallery on Al Bukhari Street. Ansar Group established the Ansar Gallery Supercenter in October 2011, over an area of 30,000 square feet.
- Qatar Billiards and Snooker Federation on Rawdat Al Khail Street.
- Al Muntazah Plaza Hotel on Rawdat Al Khail Street.
- QatarEnergy office on B Ring Road.

== Education ==
The following school is located in Fereej Bin Durham:

Name of School	Curriculum	Grade	Genders	Official Website	Ref
Pearling Season International School	British	Kindergarten – Secondary	Both	Official website	
