= Barahat Al Jufairi =

Barahat Al Jufairi براحة الجفيري
- District
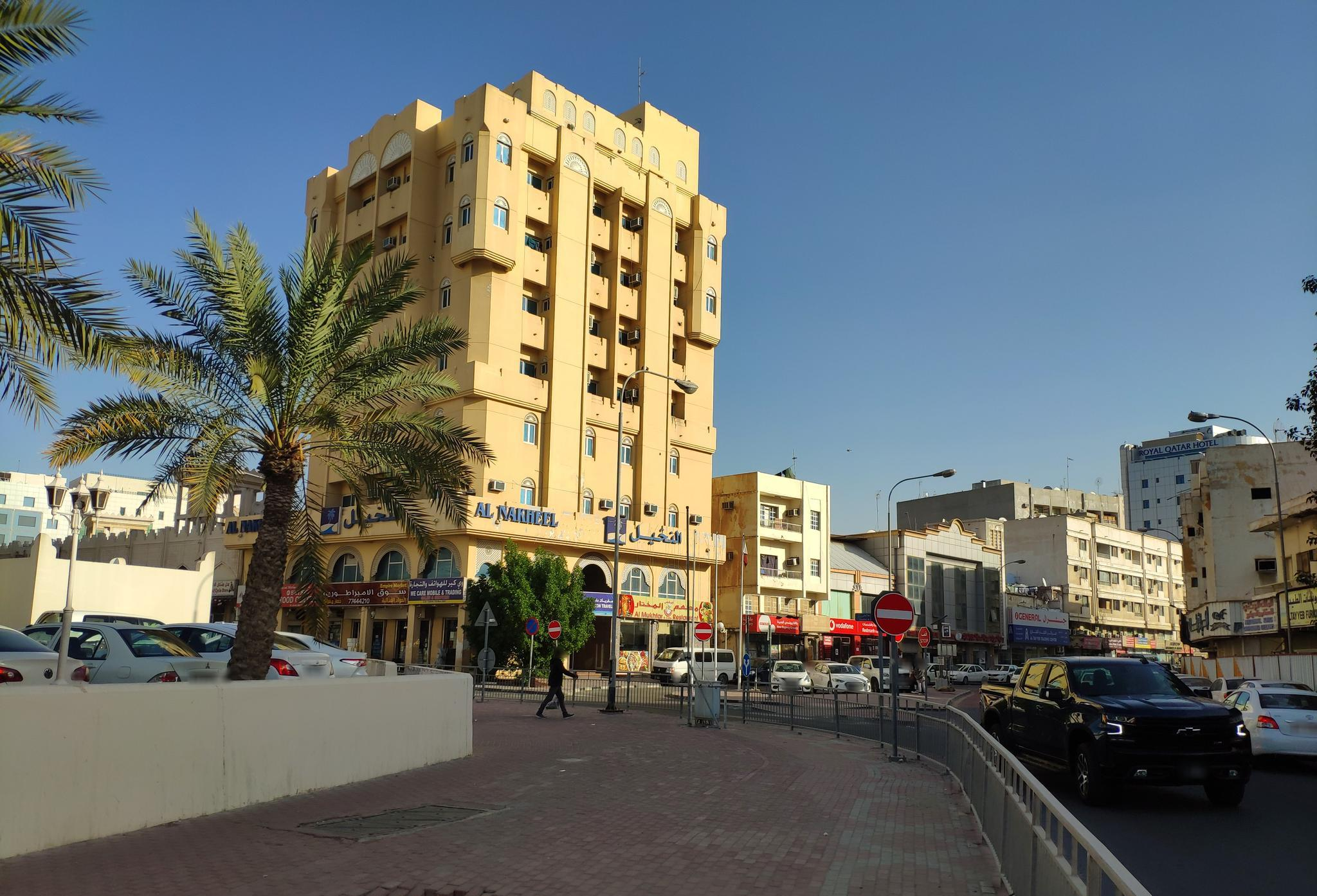
- View of Barahat Al Jufairi skyline from Al Asmakh Street

- Location within Doha Location within Qatar
- Coordinates: 25.282679°N 51.534312°E
- Country: Qatar
- Municipality: Doha
- Zone: Zone 5
- District no.: 6

Area
  - Total: 0.09 km^{2} (0.035 sq mi)

Barahat Al Jufairi (Arabic: براحة الجفيري, romanized: Brāḥat al-Jufaīry) is a district named after the Al Jufairi tribe, a highly prominent family in Qatar. Barahat Al Jufairi is a city located in the municipality of Doha. Historically, it was used as a central marketplace.

Al Ahli SC, Qatar's oldest existing sports club, was headquartered in the district at the time of its founding in 1950.

== Etymology ==
The settlement was named after a member of the Al Jufairi family, the most prevalent tribe in the area at the time of its naming. In Arabic, the term baraha is used to refer to a public space.

== Historic landmarks ==
=== Mohammed Said Nasrallah House ===
The house of Mohammed Said Nasrallah, considered to be a local landmark, is located in the city. Constructed around the late 19th to early 20th century, the house has had a long history of owners. The house is modeled in typical Arabian fashion and measures 21 m by 27 m. There are eleven rooms adjacent to a large courtyard. It contains wind towers, a rarity in Qatar during the period it was constructed. Its opulent ornamental features are also distinctive when compared to those of other local structures. Qatar's Department of Tourism and Antiquities restored the house in 1981.

=== Ismail Mandani House ===
The former residence of Ismail Mandani is one of the most luxurious 20th-century buildings in Doha and is considered a good example of vernacular architecture. Having been constructed in 1925, the building is two-storey and features costly ornamental decorations. The building is composed of two main structures and a trapezoidal courtyard. There are 15 rooms at ground floor and 4 on the first level. Traditional construction materials were used for the building.
