= Old Al Ghanim =

Old Al Ghanim الغانم العتيق
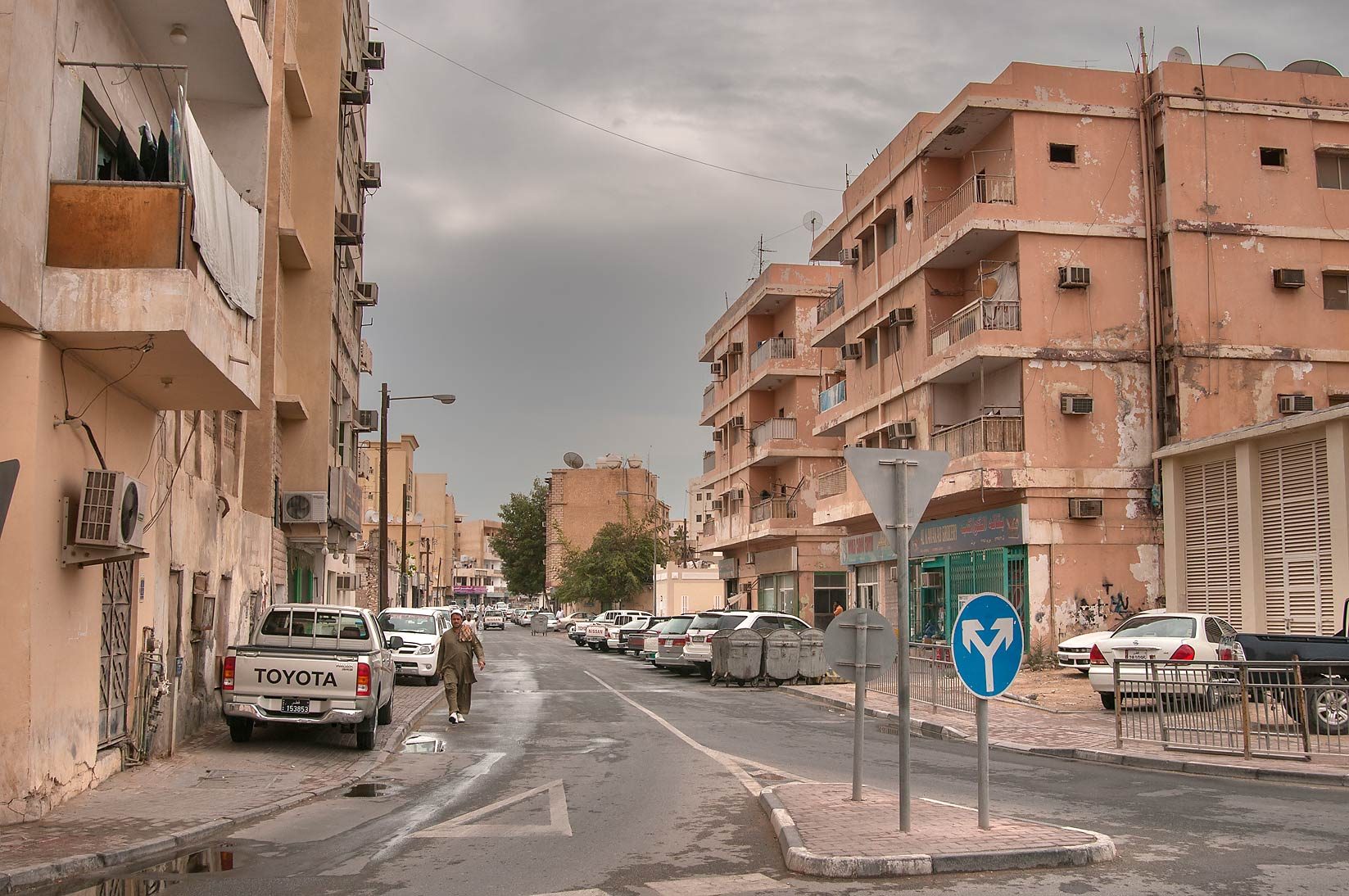
- Al Khaybar Street in Old Al Ghanim

- Location within Doha Location within Qatar
- Coordinates: 25°16′42″N 51°32′29″E
- Country: Qatar
- Municipality: Doha
- Zone: Zone 6, Zone 16
- District no.: 8

Area
  - Total: 0.27 sq mi (0.7 km^{2})

Population (2010)
  - Total: 17,692
  - Density: 65,000/sq mi (25,000/km^{2})

Old Al Ghanim (Arabic: الغانم العتيق, romanized: Al-Ghānim at-'Tīq) is a neighborhood of the Qatari capital Doha, located in the municipality of Doha. It forms a part of Doha's historic downtown. A notable landmark was the New World Centre, a supermarket established in 1987. It has since been relocated. Numerous other local businesses have also been relocated to other parts of Doha by the Ministry of Municipality and Environment so it could carry out massive-scale reconstruction of the neighborhood and clear out portions to make way for the Doha Metro. The Al Ghanim Central Bus station is another important landmark found here.

== Etymology ==
The district derives its name from the Al Ghanim branch of the Al Bin Ali tribe.

== History ==
Old Al Ghanim first emerged as a district of Doha in the early 1950s, when Qatar began exploiting its oil and natural gas resources.

One of the oldest and important surviving structures in the district is Bayt Al Zaman, a family home constructed in the early 1950s by the Al Zaman family. The house is a typical representation of mid-20th-century Qatari domestic architecture, featuring decorated façades. Situated near the then-outskirts of Doha, the residence served as a proxy commercial venue, where neighborhood women would purchase textiles and household goods directly from the family, thereby circumventing the need to visit the central Souq Waqif. In its courtyard, a makeshift movie theater was installed, which became a gathering space for local children and neighbors to view films. Following the departure of the original inhabitants, the building housed a popular Indian restaurant and later became occupied primarily by migrant workers. Today, the structure remains standing, fully detached on all four sides, and overlooks both a public square and Grand Hamad Street.

== Infrastructure ==
Indian healthcare company Aster DM Healthcare opened a clinic in Old Al Ghanim in October 2014.

== Transport ==
Transportation company Mowasalat's main bus station is located in Old Al Ghanim.

Major roads that run through the district are Grand Hamad Street, Ahmed Bin Mohammed Bin Thani Street, Jabr Bin Mohammed Street, B Ring Road, Ras Abu Aboud Street and Airport Street.

== Demographics ==
As of the 2010 census, the district comprised 3,424 housing units and 887 establishments. There were 17,692 people living in the district, of which 87% were male and 13% were female. Out of the 17,692 inhabitants, 91% were 20 years of age or older and 9% were under the age of 20.

Employed persons made up 84% of the population. Females accounted for 3% of the working population, while males accounted for 97% of the working population.

Year	Population
1986	10,399
1997	10,219
2004	11,312
2010	17,692

== Gallery ==
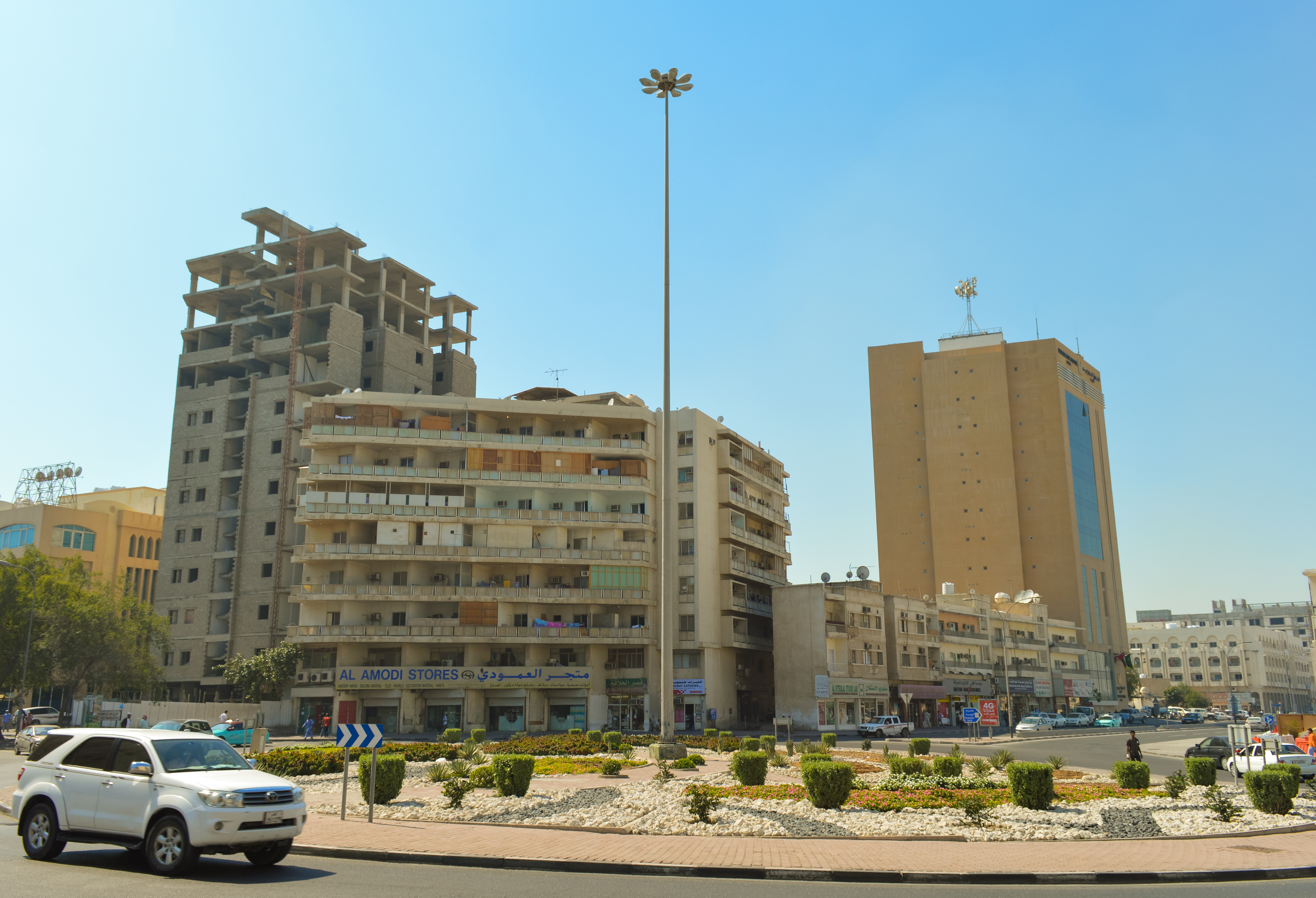
A commercial area in Old Al Ghanim.

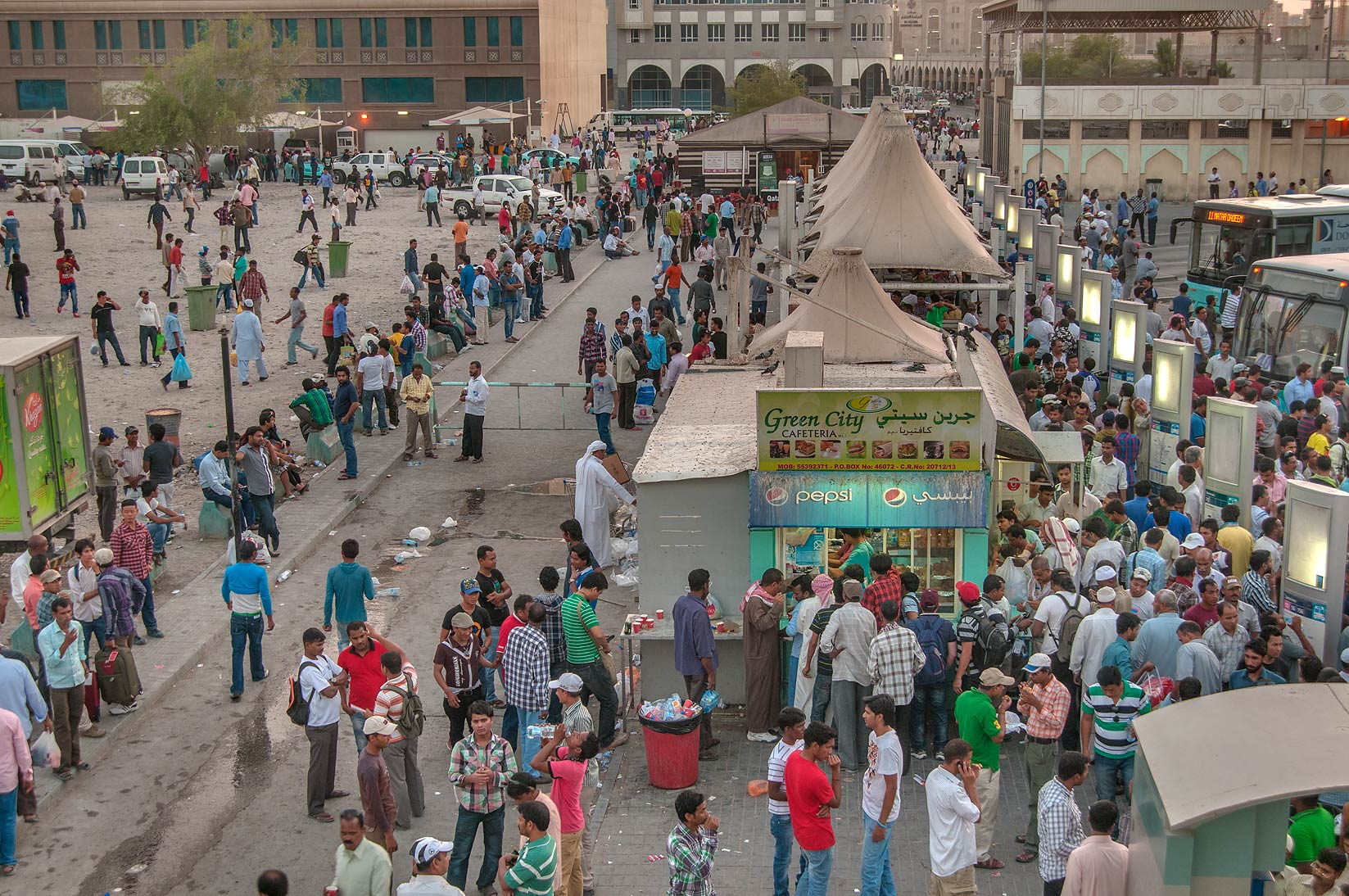
Migrant workers at Al Ghanim Central Bus Station.

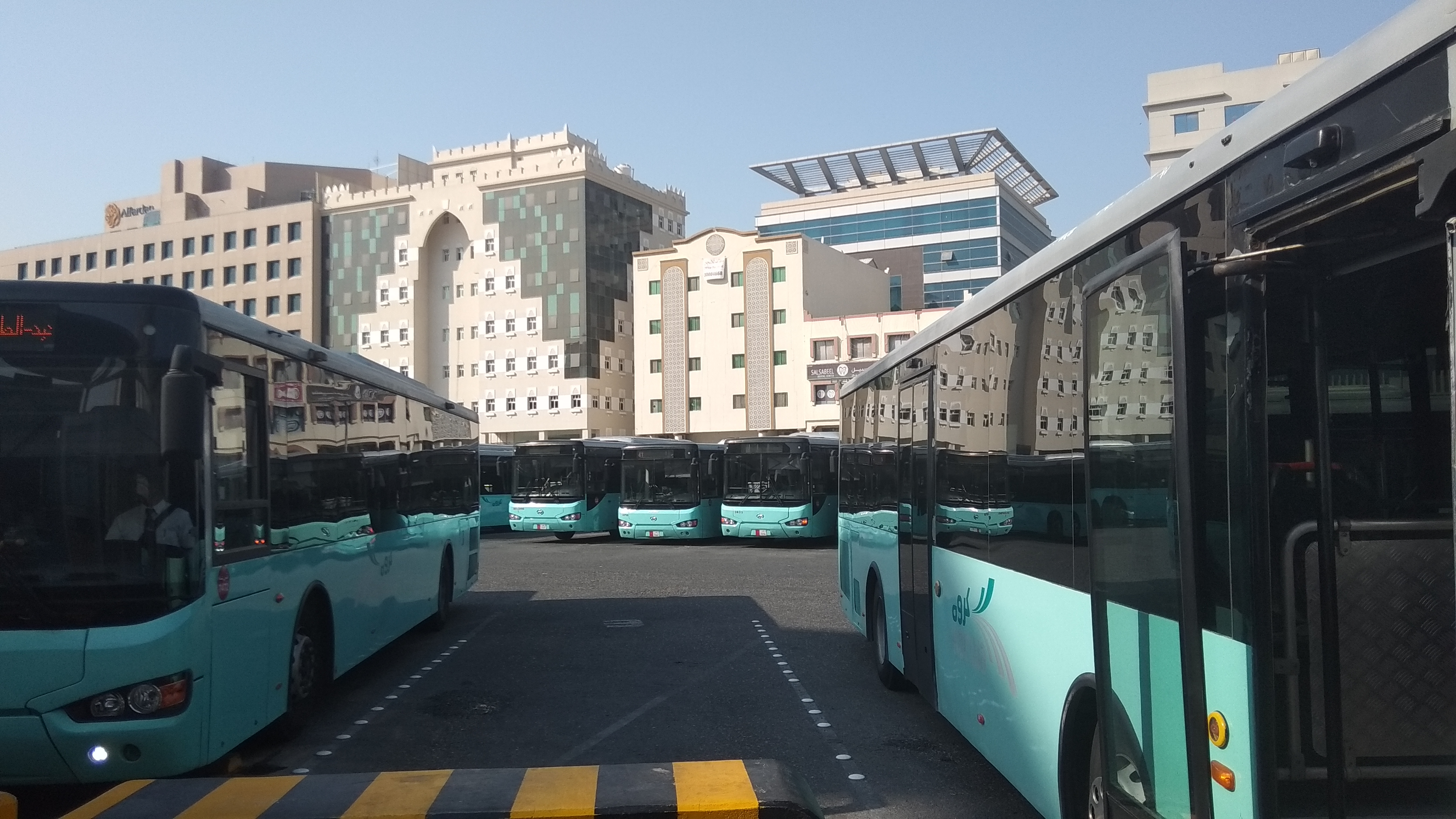
Al Ghanim Mowasalat's main bus station
