= Tenbek =

Tenbek الرحية
- Village
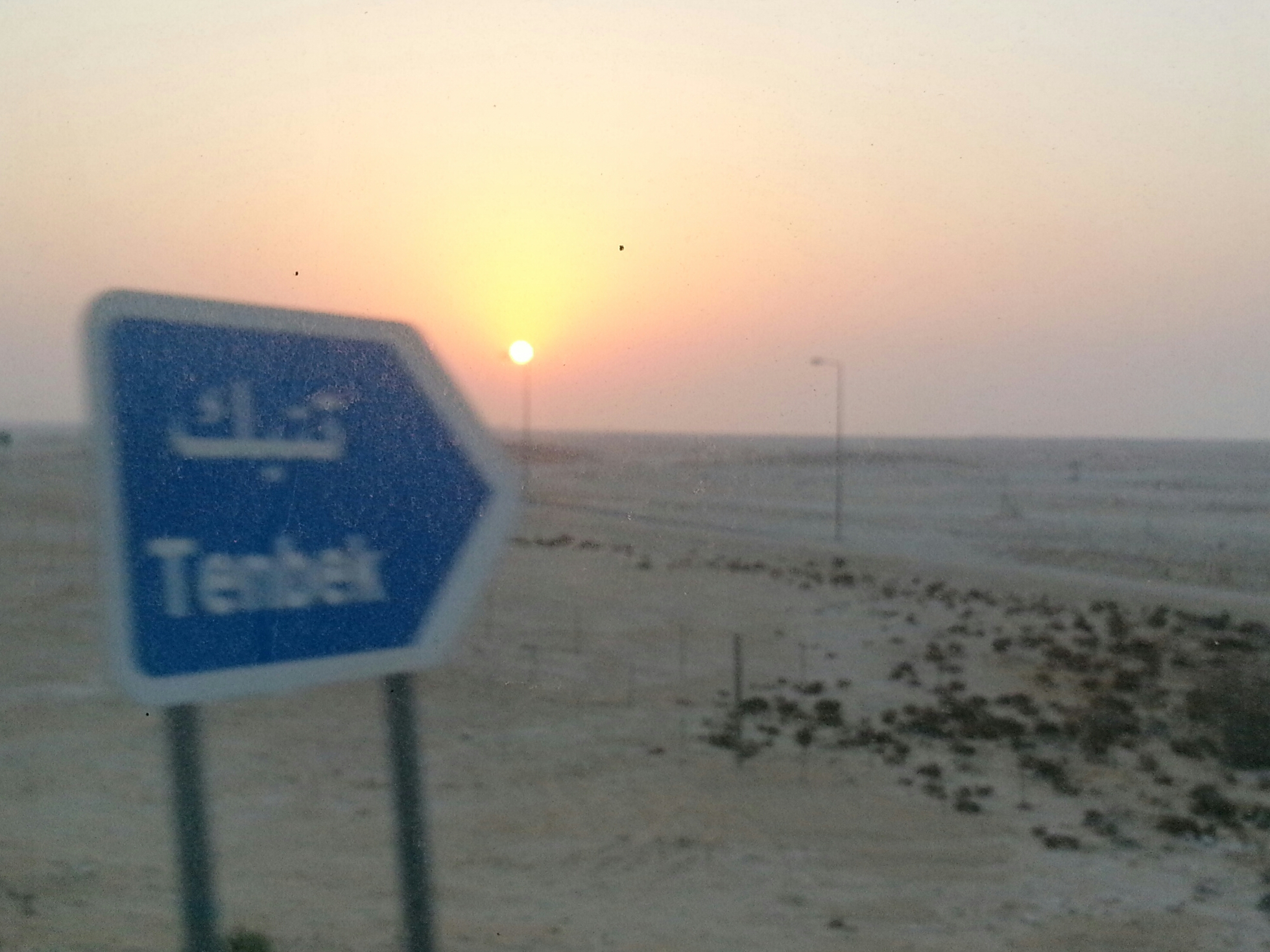
- Road sign indicating Tenbek

- Location in Qatar
- Coordinates: 25.603895°N 51.463817°E
- Country: Qatar
- Municipality: Al Daayen
- Zone: Zone 70
- District no.: 287

Area
  - Total: 3.7 sq mi (9.6 km^{2})
- Elevation: 33 ft (10 m)

Tenbek (Arabic: تنبك; also spelled as Tinbak and Tinbij) is a historical village located in the municipality of Al Daayen in northeastern Qatar. It is situated approximately 55 kilometres (34 mi) north of the capital Doha, near the city of Al Khor, and lies just west of the Al Khor Coastal Highway.

Nearby settlements include Al Rehayya to the north and Simaisma to the south-east.

== Etymology ==
The village of Tenbek is also known locally as Tinbij, a variant pronunciation in the Qatari Arabic dialect. The term tinbij is derived from classical Arabic roots and refers to a type of land where underground water rises naturally to the surface.

== History ==
According to local tradition, Tenbek is the ancestral homeland of the Al Humaidat tribe.

J.G. Lorimer's Gazetteer of the Persian Gulf (1908) records Tenbek (as Tinbak), describing it as a Bedouin encampment featuring a fort and six masonry wells sunk to a depth of approximately 10 metres (33 ft). These wells yielded potable water and were set in stony terrain roughly four miles south of Al Khor and near the coast. Tinbak was also marked in a 1930s map produced by the British Political Residency in Bushire, alongside nearby settlements such as Aswaija (Umm Suwayya), Al Uqdah (Al Egda), and Sumesma (Simaisma).

The establishment of permanent residence in Tenbek is attributed to Mohammed bin Amer Al Humaidi, who migrated from Al Daayen to the nearby area of Al Ghaf during the collapse of the pearl trade in the early 20th century. In 1936, he settled in Tenbek, constructing two rooms and purchasing farmland from a member of the Al Kaabi tribe. The village population grew during and after a period of famine between 1936 and 1948, as displaced Qatari families returned from Bahrain and Saudi Arabia. By 1946, several families, including those of Jaber Al Humaidi and Abdullah Al Humaidi, had re-established homes in Tenbek and its vicinity. In 1967, the village residents moved to government-provided housing, later referred to as "Modern Tenbek". Basic infrastructure, such as electricity and piped water, was introduced in 1973.

== Geography ==
Tenbek occupies an area of approximately 24 hectares, bordered on three sides by agricultural land and historically linked by roads to Al Egda to the north, Simaisma to the east, and Uwainat Bin Hussein to the south. The village comprises 18 residential structures arranged at low density, with house courtyards occupying nearly 47% of the village's land area. Public buildings, including a mosque, animal enclosures, and three majlis, comprise about 4% of the site.

The village is characterized by irregular, informally developed footpaths of varying width. These trails connect houses directly and are arranged in a loose hierarchy: wide outer paths for livestock, narrower internal alleys, and pedestrian-only lanes between dwellings. The paving material commonly used was subaan, a coastal mixture of shells and sand resistant to wind erosion.

== Architecture ==
All homes in Tenbek were inhabited by members of the Al Humaidi lineage or their close kin, and the village retained a tightly knit tribal structure. Households typically consisted of five persons, though some included African laborers historically brought to Qatar to assist with pearl diving, agriculture, and herding. These workers were treated as family and lived in housing comparable in size and layout to those of their employers.

The architectural layout adhered to traditional Qatari domestic patterns, with each house organized around an internal courtyard. The courtyard served as the nucleus of the household, offering both privacy and multifunctional space for gardens, storage, or future expansion. Functional rooms, such as kitchens, storage rooms, and guest spaces were typically arranged around the courtyard with indirect access to ensure privacy. Some households shared facilities; for instance, two adjacent homes might share a kitchen or storeroom.

== Infrastructure ==
Prior to the provision of municipal services, residents relied on gas lanterns and electric generators. The absence of local shops meant that villagers regularly traveled to Al Khor, approximately 4 miles (6.4 km) away, for essential goods. Consequently, homes were built with small food storage rooms averaging 6 square metres (65 sq ft) in size to reduce dependence on frequent supply trips.
