= Duhail =

Duhail دحيل
- District
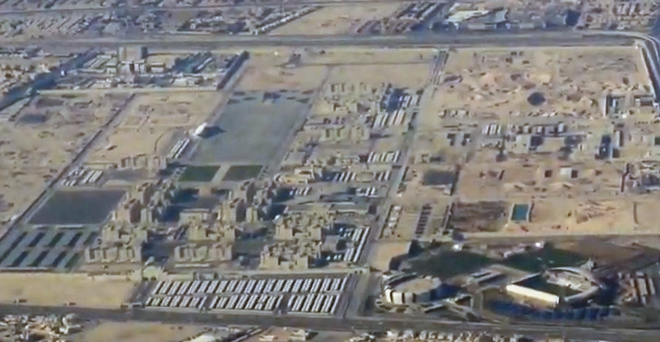
- Aerial view of the ISF area of Duhail, looking west

- Location within Doha Location within Qatar
- Coordinates: 25.3491°N 51.4677°E
- Country: Qatar
- Municipality: Doha
- Zone: Zone 30
- District no.: 27

Area
  - Total: 6.8 km^{2} (2.6 sq mi)

Population
  - Total: 7,059
  - Density: 1,000/km^{2} (2,700/sq mi)

Duhail (Arabic: دحيل, romanized: Duḩayl) is a district in Qatar, located in the municipality of Doha. The district's northern half accommodates the main base of the Internal Security Forces (also known as Lekhwiya) as well as Abdullah bin Khalifa Stadium, which serves as the home grounds for Qatar Stars League club Al-Duhail SC.

== Etymology ==
The district's name is derived from dahal, the Arabic term for "cavern", and was named in recognition of a large cavern in the region.

== History ==
In J.G. Lorimer's Gazetteer of the Persian Gulf written in the early 1900s, he makes mention of Dahail, noting its location as 6 km northwest of Doha, and describing it in the following sentence: "here is a rocky pool containing good water; it is in a cave at the foot of a low hill".

In 1983–84, Duhail was included as part of a major Ministry of Public Works project, valued at QAR 535 million, to develop sewage infrastructure in major settlements outside of Doha.

== Landmarks ==
- Fereej Duhail Stadium (managed by the Qatar Olympic Committee) on Bu Sidra Street.
- Duhail Park on Al Galayel Street.
- Qatar Paralympic Committee on Al Khattiya Street.

== Transport ==
Mowasalat is the official transport company of Qatar and serves the community through its operation of public bus routes. Duhail is served by two bus lines, both of which depart from Al Ghanim Bus Station. Route 170 has stops at Duhail and Umm Salal Ali and a terminus at Umm Qarn, running at a frequency of every 120 minutes on all days of the week. The other route, route 172, has stops at Duhail and Al Kheesa New Road and a terminus at Al Kheesa, also running at frequency of every 120 minutes on all days of the week.

Major roads that run through the district are Duhail Street, Al Khafji Street, and Al Shamal Road.

Currently, the underground Al Duhail Metro Station is under construction, having been launched during Phase 2A. Once completed, it will be part of Doha Metro's Green Line.

== Demographics ==
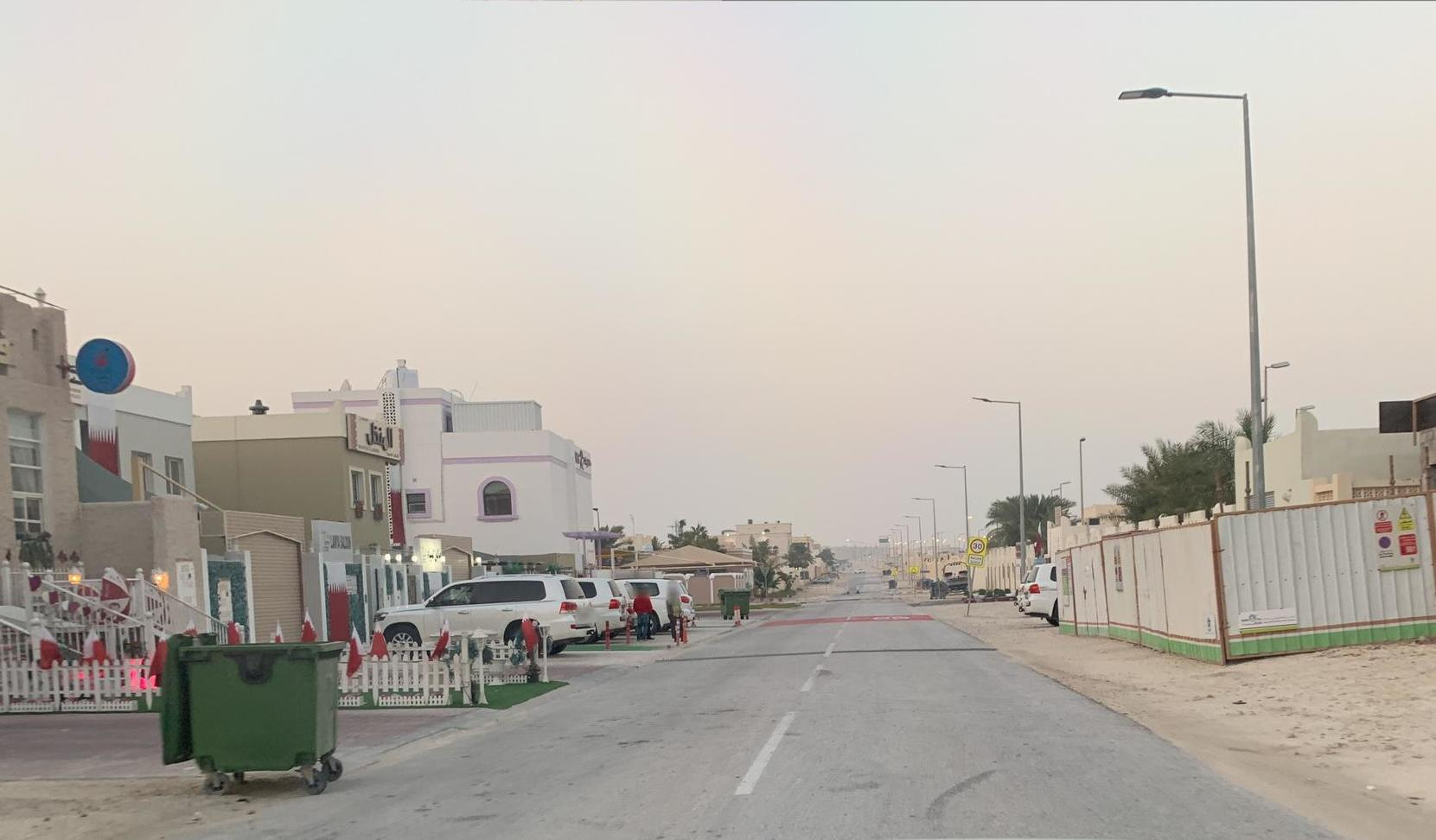
Al Khattiya Street in Duhail

As of the 2010 census, the district comprised 1,091 housing units and 55 establishments. There were 7,059 people living in the district, of which 48% were male and 52% were female. Out of the 7,059 inhabitants, 61% were 20 years of age or older and 39% were under the age of 20. The literacy rate stood at 97.5%.

Employed persons made up 48% of the total population. Females accounted for 44% of the working population, while males accounted for 56% of the working population.

Year	Population
1986	596
1997	1,866
2004	4,093
2010	7,059

== Education ==
The following schools are located in Duhail:

Name of School	Curriculum	Grade	Genders	Official Website	Ref
Al Duhail Model Independent Boys	Independent	Kindergarten – Primary	Male-only	N/A	
Creative Child Nursery	International	Nursery	Both	Official website	
