= Jeryan Jenaihat =

Jeryan Jenaihat جريان جنيحات
- District
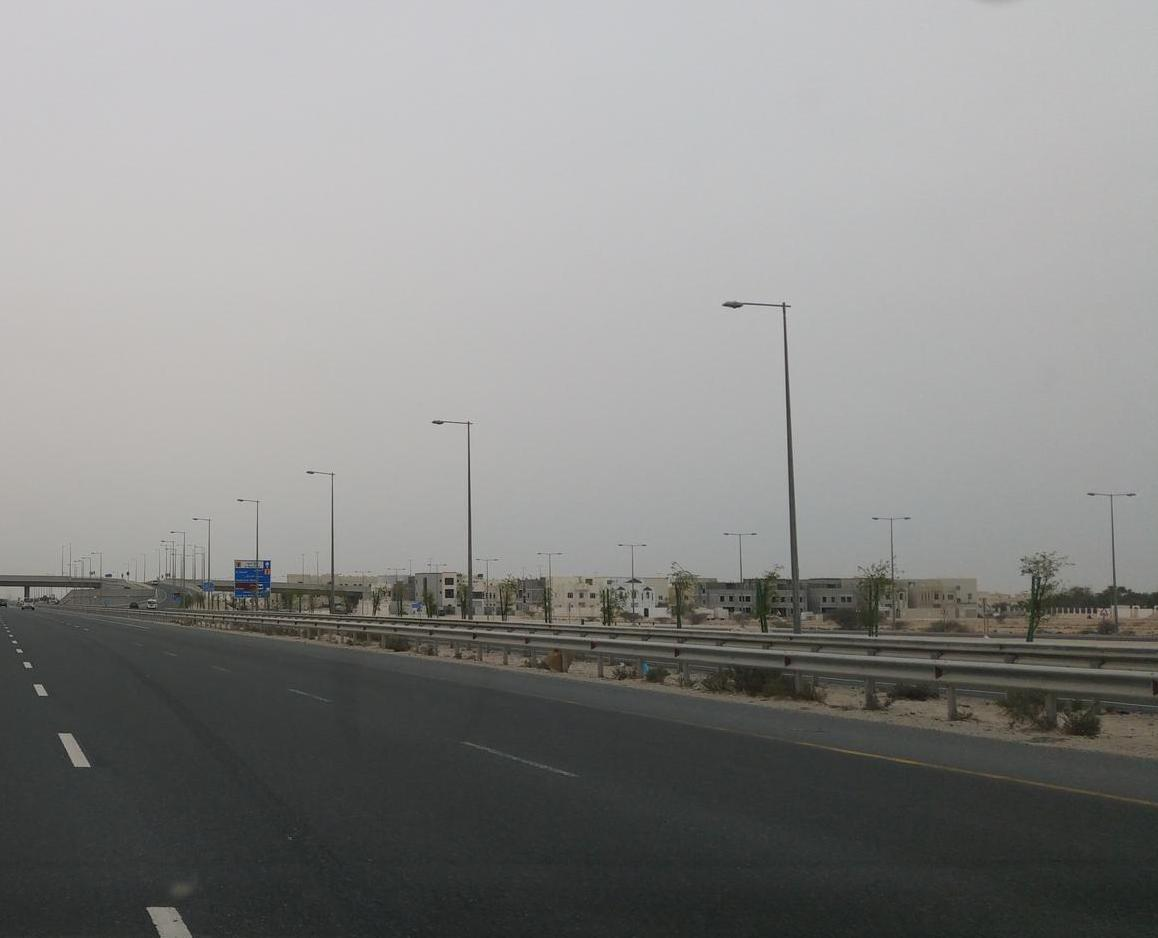
- View of residences in Jeryan Jenaihat off Al Shamal Road

- Location in Qatar
- Coordinates: 25.397490°N 51.441326°E
- Country: Qatar
- Municipality: Al Daayen
- Zone: Zone 70
- District no.: 118

Area
  - Total: 3.5 sq mi (9.0 km^{2})
- Elevation: 56 ft (17 m)

Jeryan Jenaihat (Arabic: جريان جنيحات, romanized: Jiryān Junayḩāt) is a district in Qatar located in the municipality of Al Daayen.

Al Kharaitiyat in Umm Salal Municipality is to the west while Wadi Al Banat is to the east. Other nearby districts include Al Ebb to the south and Al Kheesa to the northeast.

== Infrastructure ==
Poor infrastructure is a problem in Jeryan Jenaihat. No health centers or parks are based in the district, and only a limited number of shops operate here. The roads, mostly unpaved, suffer from unevenness and are excessively narrow with limited connectivity between each other. Light poles are sparse, making it dangerous to drive during the nighttime. Signage and traffic signals are also seldom found here. Furthermore, many of the streets are unnamed, which makes it difficult for public services to locate them. Parts of the district are also not connected to the main sewage network.

In response to these issues, the government has announced that it would carry out renovations on the road and sewage systems, as well as construct new public infrastructure such as a park, a government complex and a health center.

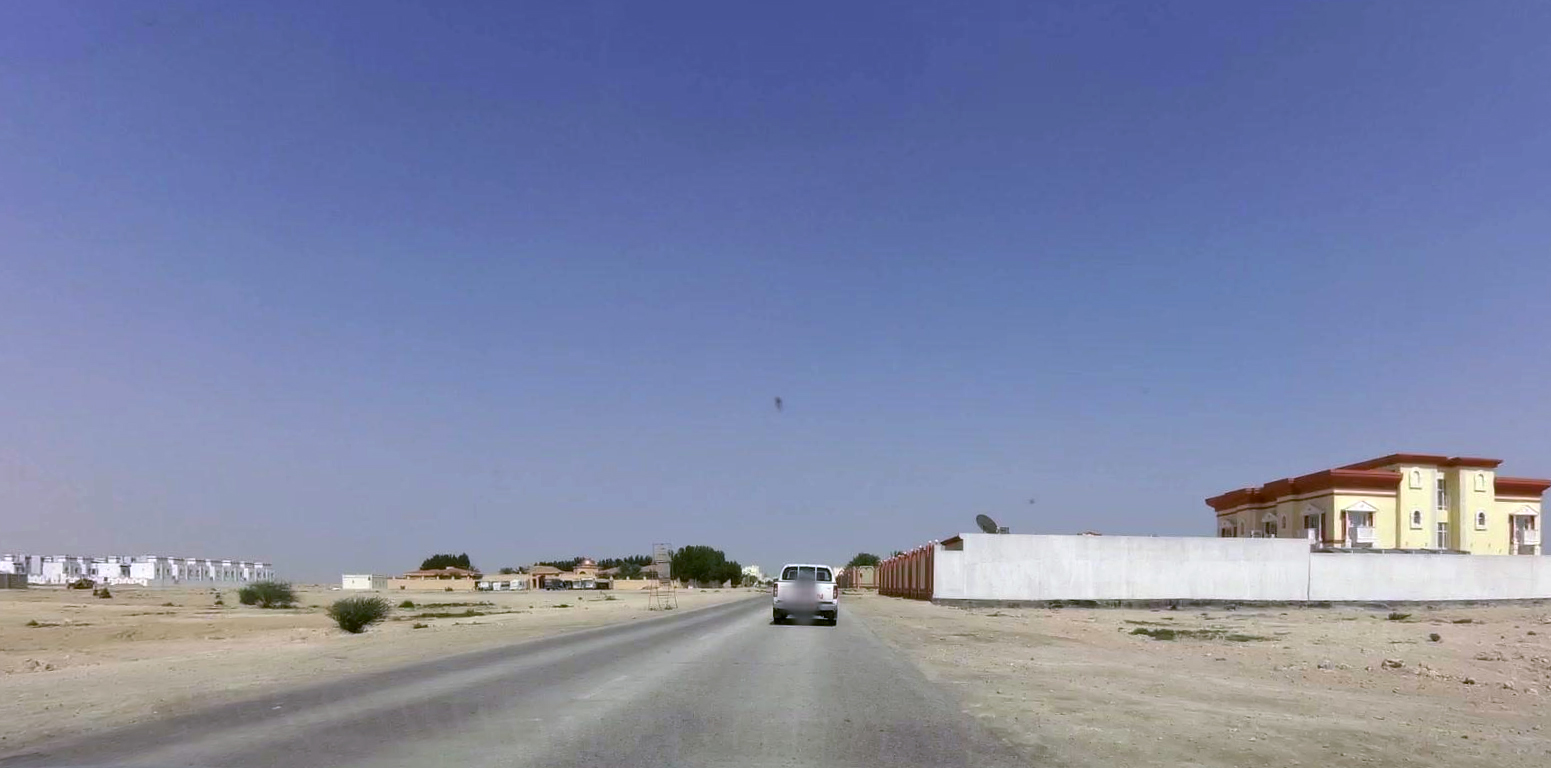
Zekreet Street in Jeryan Jenaihat
