= Leabaib =

Leabaib لعبيب
- Village
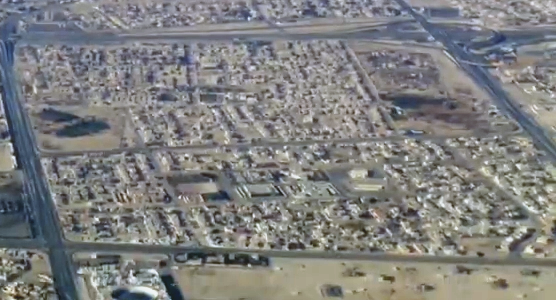
- Aerial view of Leabaib, looking west

- Leabaib
- Coordinates: 25°23′31″N 51°28′8″E
- Country: Qatar
- Municipality: Al Daayen
- Zone: Zone 70
- District no.: 115

Area
  - Total: 4.4 km^{2} (1.7 sq mi)

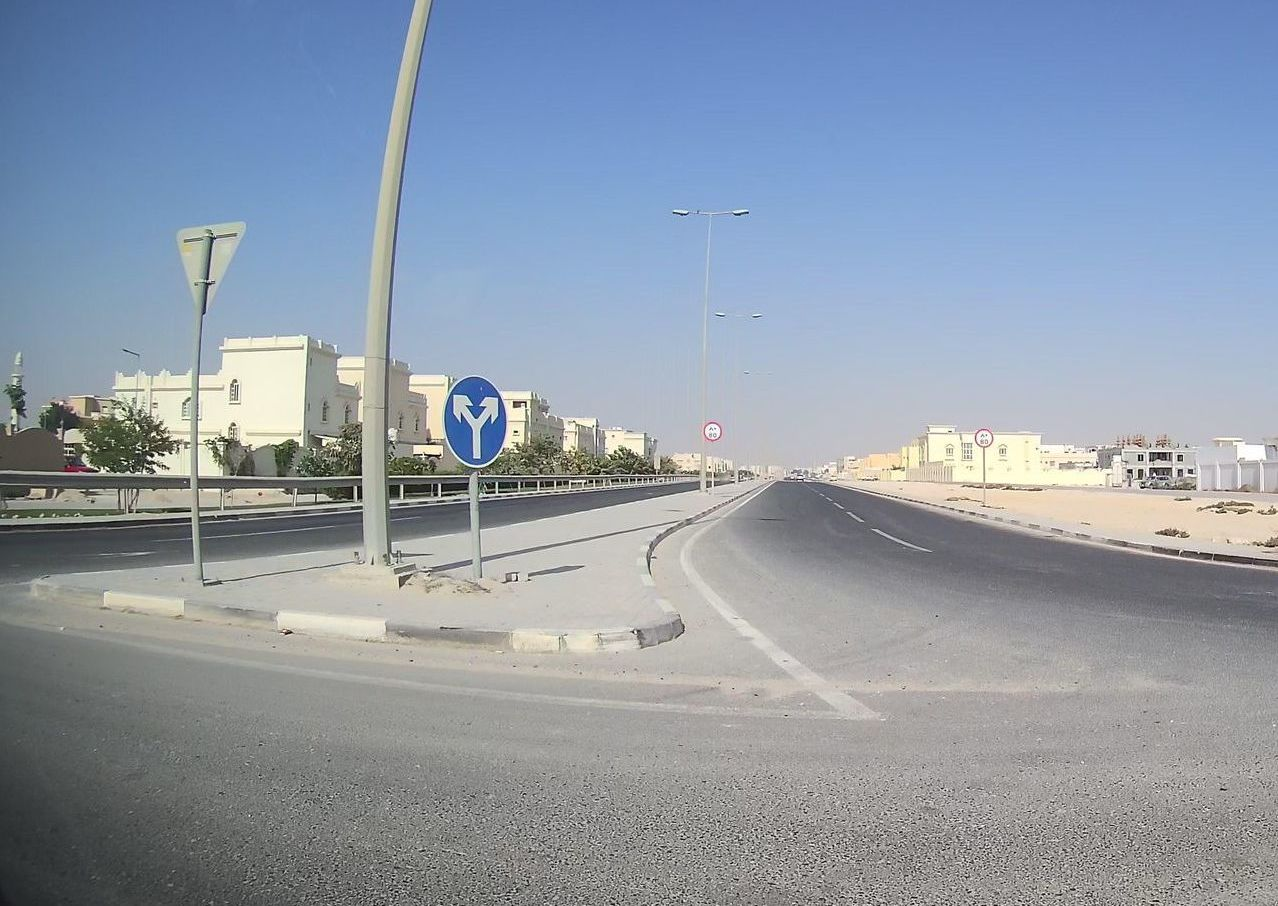
Qutaifan Street in Leabaib

Leabaib (Arabic: لعبيب, romanized: Li'abaīb) is a village in Qatar, located in the municipality of Al Daayen. It is currently under development as a mixed-use hub for southern Al Daayen, particularly for residential districts such as Jeryan Nejaima, Al Nuwaimi, and for residences located near Arab League Street.

== Geography ==
Located in the southwest corner of Al Daayen, Leabaib borders the Umm Salal municipality to the west, the Duhail district of Doha to the south and Al Ebb to the north.

== Healthcare ==
In December 2015, a primary healthcare center was opened in the village. Several public clinics are located within the center, such as a vaccination clinic, dental clinic and radiology clinic.

== Visitor attractions ==
A 4,376 sq meter family park is located in Leabib. Several local trees such as palm trees and neems are planted in the park.

== Development ==
The Qatar National Master Plan (QNMP) is described as a "spatial representation of the Qatar National Vision 2030". As part of the QNMP's Urban Centre plan, which aims to implement development strategies in 28 central hubs that will serve their surrounding communities, Leabaib has been designated a District Centre, which is the lowest designation.

Al Daayen municipality is developing Leabaib as a major mixed use center for the municipality's southern sector. Its close proximity to Duhail and the headquarters of Al-Duhail SC will be capitalized on by developing more residential units and government offices in the village. Currently, it is typified by low-density villas, several mosques, three schools, a civic center and a health center. Future plans will see the construction of additional housing so that it may accommodate as many as 30,000 residents.

As the nearest metro station will be 1 kilometre (0.62 mi) west of the district's borders, plans are being drawn up to improve public transportation and the road system. Mid-height buildings will be located in the south of the District Centre. Furthermore, new parks and green spaces are expected to be created.
