= Wadi Al Wasaah =

Wadi Al Wasaah وادي الوسعة
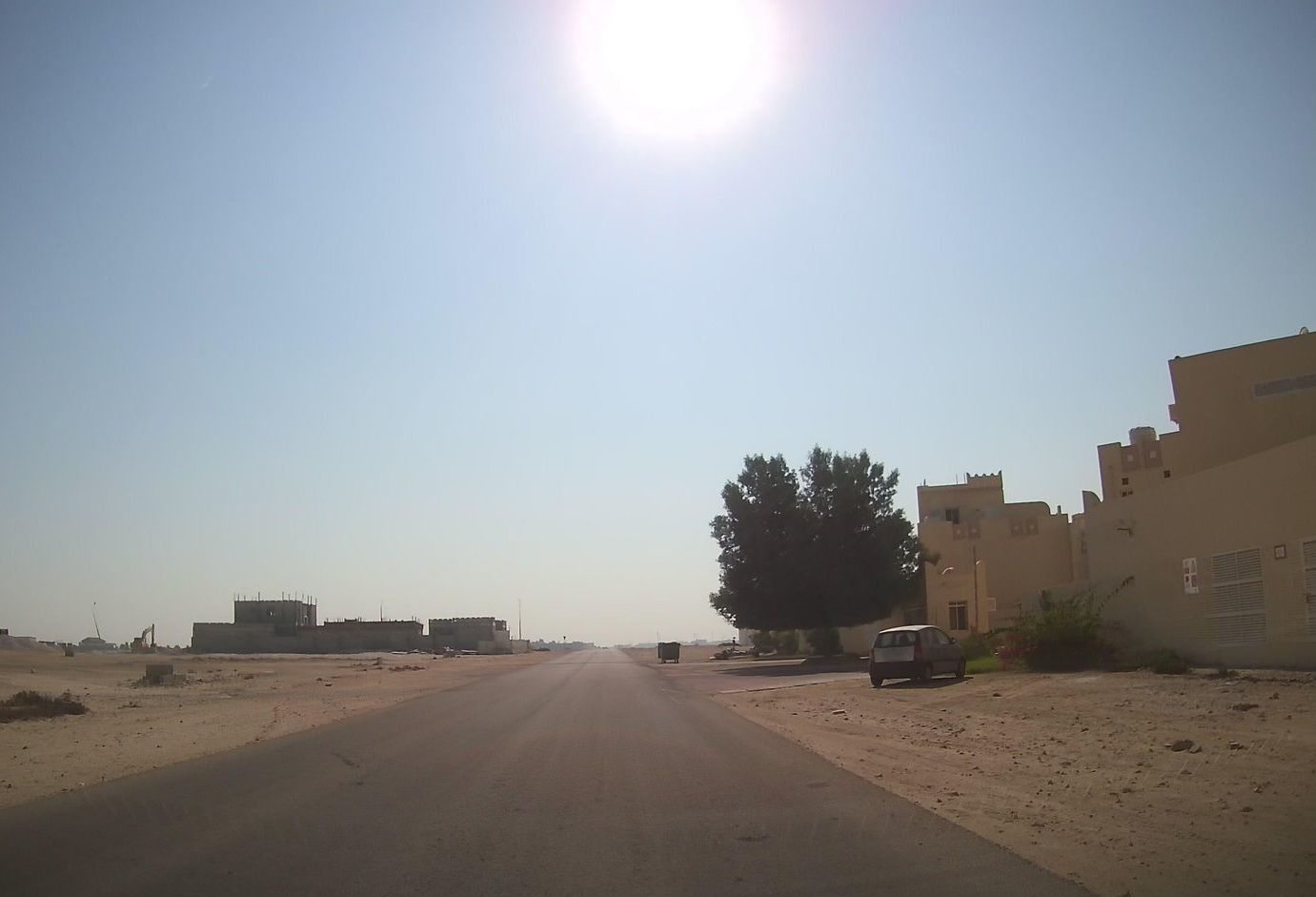
- Jeryan Jenaihat Street in Wadi Al Wasaah

- Location within Qatar
- Coordinates: 25°26′51″N 51°26′1″E
- Country: Qatar
- Municipality: Al Daayen
- Zone: Zone 70
- District no.: 771

Area
  - Total: 3.6 km^{2} (1.4 sq mi)

Wadi Al Wasaah (Arabic: وادي الوسعة, romanized: Wādī al Was‘ah) is a Qatari village located in the municipality of Al Daayen. It is bordered by the Umm Salal Municipality to west, Rawdat Al Hamama to the east and Al Sakhama to the north.

== Etymology ==
Named after a prominent geographic feature, wadi is an Arabic term reserved for dry river valleys. The second part of its name, wasaah, is an Arabic term for "wide". It was given this name due to the vast expanse of a prominent wadi which traverses the area, extending from Umm Salal to Al Khubaiba.
