= Al Masrouhiya =

Al Masrouhiya المسروحية
- Village
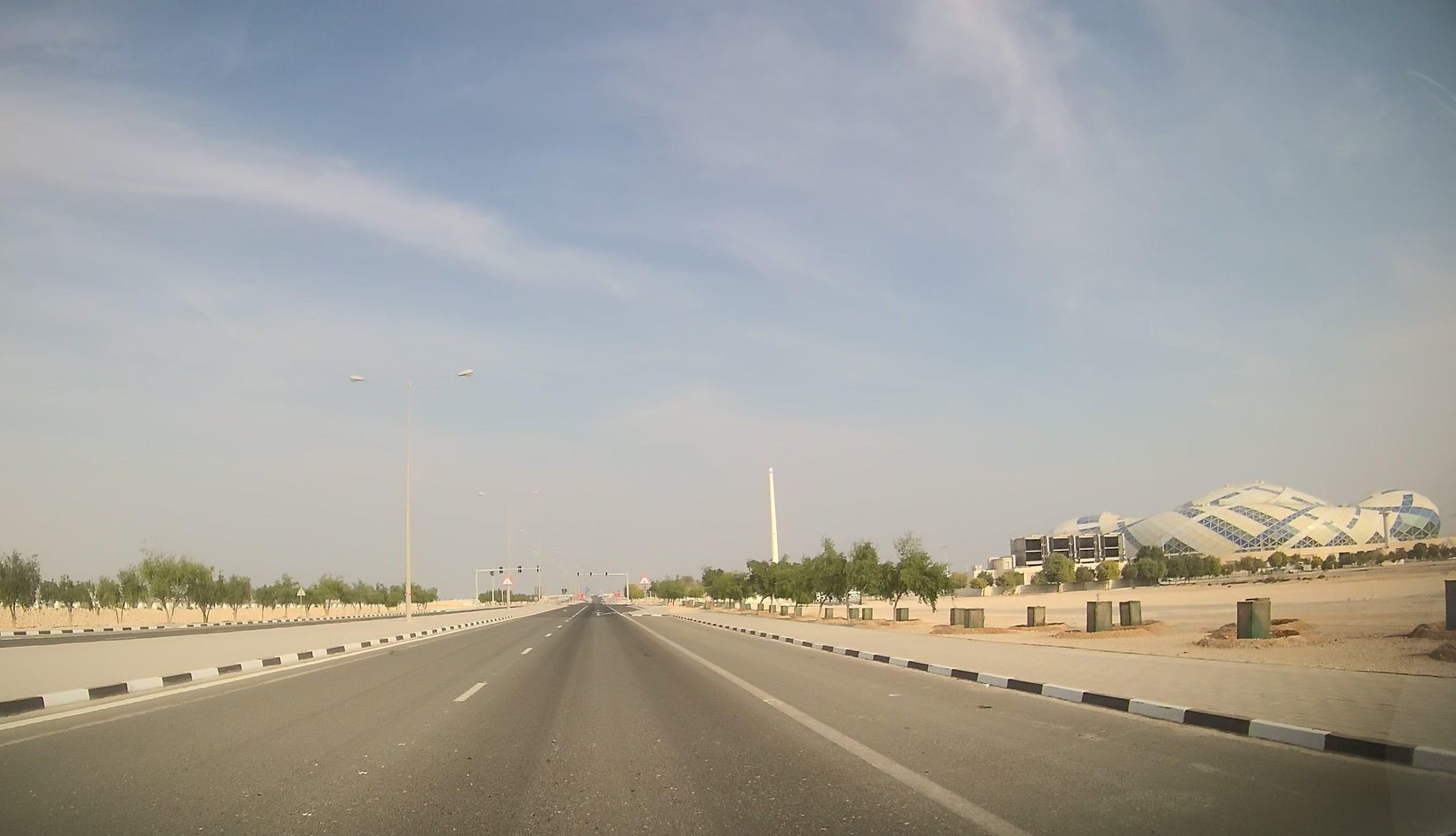
- Zaafaran Street in Al Masrouhiya

- Al Masrouhiya
- Coordinates: 25°27′39″N 51°27′39″E
- Country: Qatar
- Municipality: Al Daayen
- Zone: Zone 70
- District no.: 122

Area
  - Total: 9.7 km^{2} (3.7 sq mi)

Al Masrouhiya (Arabic: المسروحية) is a Qatari village located in the municipality of Al Daayen.

== Etymology ==
The village derives its name from the Arabic term saraha, related to foraging. As the site of a large rawdat (depression), rainfall would accumulate there, facilitating plant growth suitable for grazing by the herds of nomads passing through.

== Geography ==
Located near the eastern shores of Al Daayen, Al Masrouhiya borders:

- Rawdat Al Hamama to the south, separated by Wadi Al Wasah Street.
- Wadi Lusail to the west, separated by Street 1707.
- Lusail to the east, separated by Al Khor Coastal Road.
