= Wadi Lusail =

Wadi Lusail وادي لوسيل
- District
- Location within Qatar
- Coordinates: 25.49551°N 51.432371°E
- Country: Qatar
- Municipality: Al Daayen
- Zone: Zone 70
- District no.: 121

Area
  - Total: 31.7 km^{2} (12.2 sq mi)
- Elevation: 9 m (30 ft)

Wadi Lusail (Arabic: وادي لوسيل) is a Qatari district located in the municipality of Al Daayen.

In the 2015 census, it was listed as a district of Zone 70, which has a population of 53,001 and also includes 11 other districts.

It borders Al Sakhama to the south-west and Al Masrouhiya to the south-east.

== Etymology ==
Acquiring its name from geographical features, wadi is the Arabic term used for dry river valleys, whereas lusail is a diminutive of wassail, the local name of a plant found in large numbers nearby.
