= Al Daayen (village) =

Al Daayen Village الضعاين
- Village
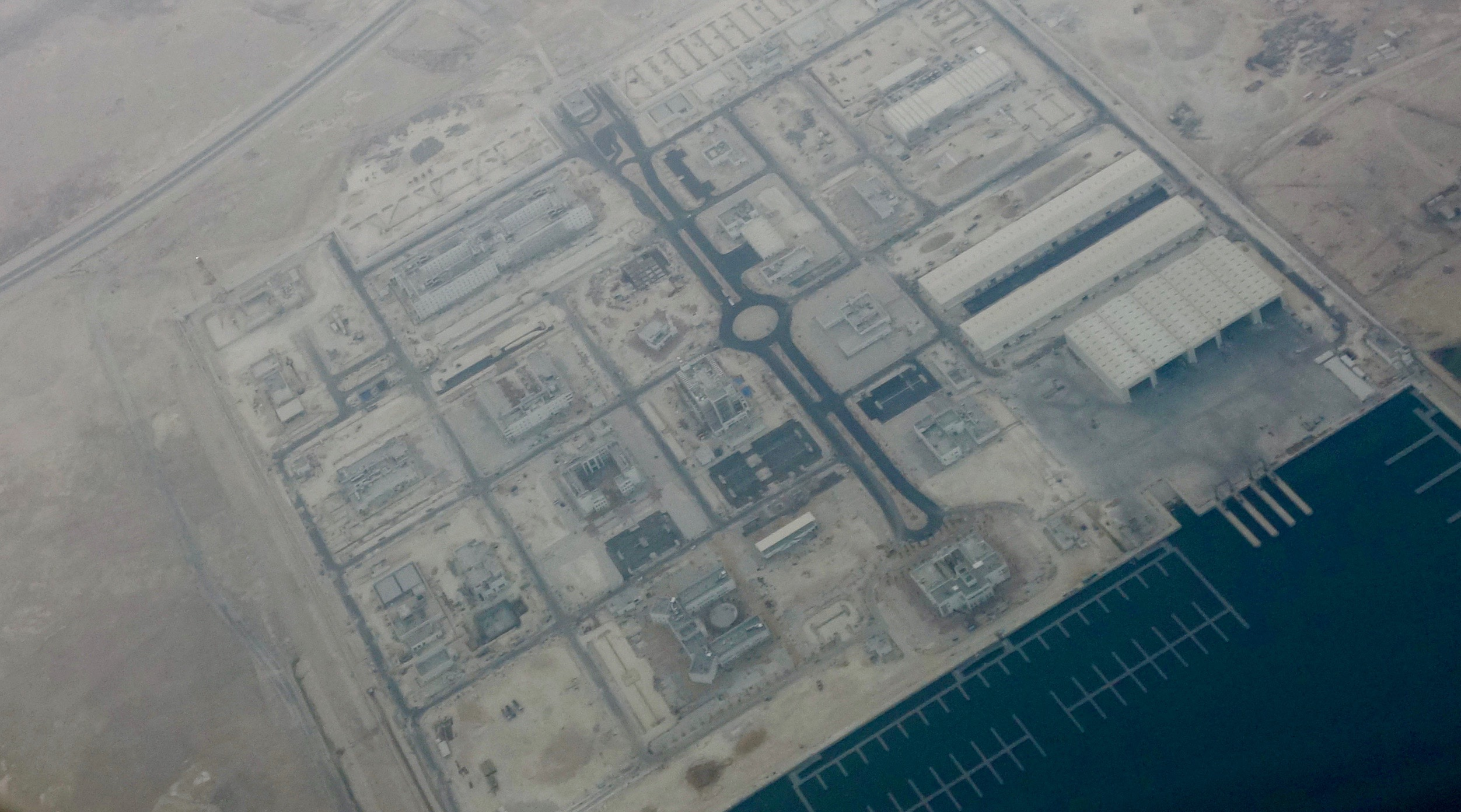
- Aerial view of Al Daayen in 2017

- Al Daayen Village
- Coordinates: 25°34′01″N 51°29′05″E
- Country: Qatar
- Municipality: Al Daayen
- Zone: Zone 70
- District no.: 124

Area
  - Total: 12.3 km^{2} (4.7 sq mi)

Al Daayen (Arabic: الضعاين [ALA-LC: al-Ḍaʻāyin; Wehr: aḍ-ḍaʿāyin]; also spelled as الظعاين [ALA-LC: al-Ẓaʻāyin; Wehr: aẓ-ẓaʿāyin]) is a Qatari village in the municipality of Al Daayen. Prior to the discovery of oil and natural gas, it was one of the larger fishing and pearling villages on Qatar's east coast.

== Etymology ==
Two theories are offered for the village's name. According to the Ministry of Municipality and Environment, the name is derived from the Arabic word dhaayen, which roughly translates to "travel". It was given this name in reference to the Qatari tribes who abandoned the village and traveled elsewhere in search of water and suitable pasture. The second theory, given in the Encyclopedia of Qatari Information, states that the name is derived from an Arabic term used to denote a place for camels to rest.

== History ==
J.G. Lorimer's Gazetteer of the Persian Gulf gives an account of the village of Al Daayen in 1908:

A village on the eastern coast of Qatar about 20 miles north of Doha. It is closely connected with the village of Simaisma, which is distant from it only about 1 mile westwards. Dha'ain consists of about 150 houses, mostly of Al Bu Kuwarah [Kuwari] with some of Hamaidat [Humaidi] and a few of Madhahakah. About 70 pearl boats belong to the place, besides 10 trading vessels and 10 fishing boats. Transport animals are 10 horses and 60 camels. Drinking water is from 'Awainat Bin-Husain, 6 miles inland.

Lorimer also notes that a man named Ahmed bin Salman committed piracy off the coast of Al Daayen in 1902.
