= Doha metropolitan area =

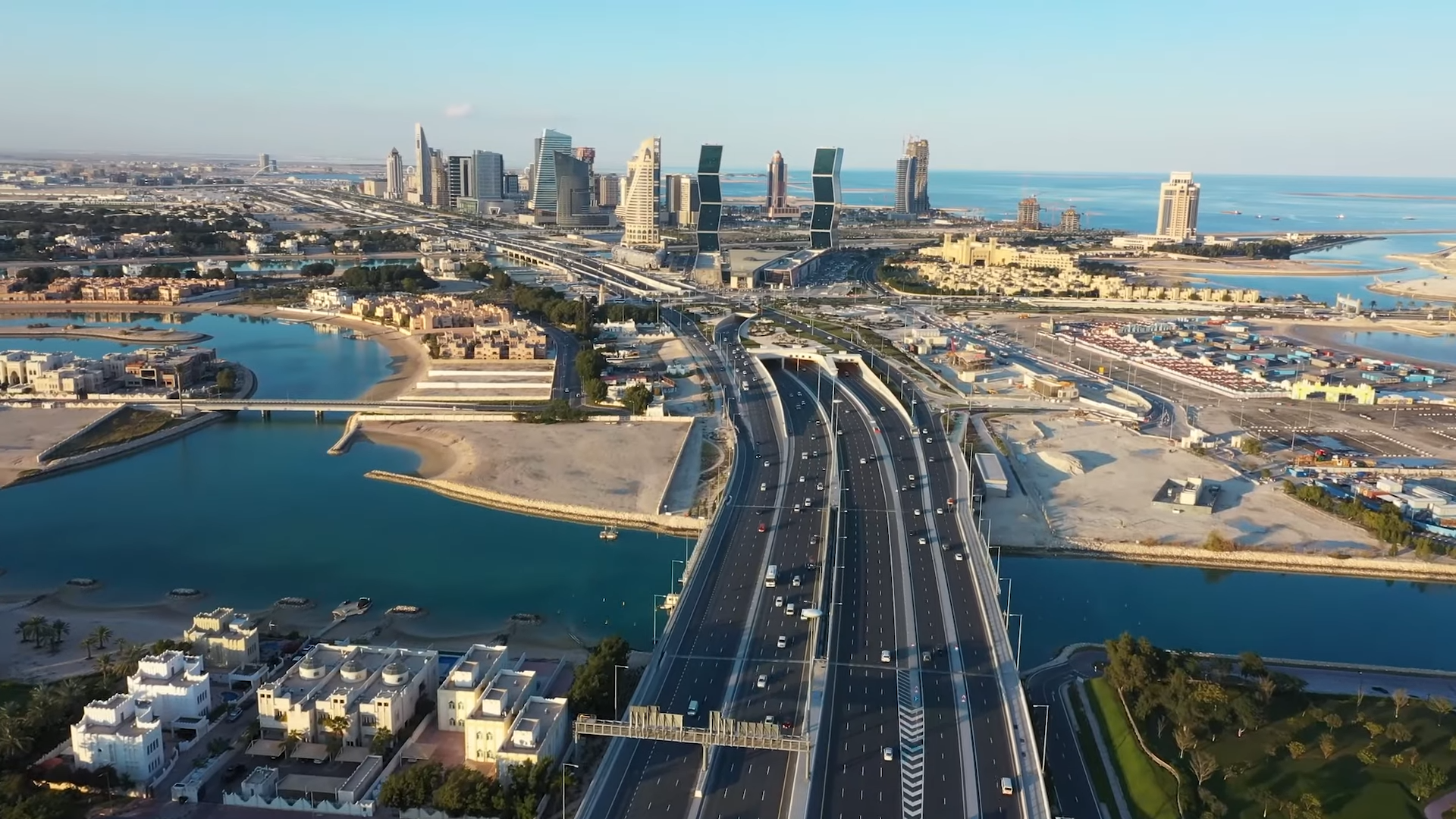
The contiguously urbanized border area between southern Al Daayen and northern Doha is considered a part of the Doha Metropolitan Area

The Doha Metropolitan Area (DMA; also known as Greater Doha Area) is the metropolitan area of Doha, the capital city of Qatar. The DMA comprises several contiguous cities and urban zones immediately surrounding Doha, serving as the main area of Qatar's population concentration. As of 2021, the population of the metropolitan area is upwards of 2 million.

== Boundaries ==
The exact boundaries of the DMA are open to interpretation, with different definitions existing. However, at a minimum, the following areas are included in the DMA:

- All of Doha Municipality
- Parts of Al Rayyan Municipality
  - Aspire Zone
  - Education City
  - Doha Industrial Area
  - Wholesale Market Area
  - Al Rayyan City
- Parts of Al Daayen Municipality

Some definitions attribute a larger area to the DMA by including the entire urbanized section in the easternmost half of Al Rayyan Municipality, all of northern Al Wakrah Municipality terminating before Mesaieed, all of Umm Salal Municipality and all of Al Daayen Municipality, including the city of Lusail.

== History ==
The Doha Metropolitan Area has seen substantial growth since the 1980s, marking when Qatar began investing its hydrocarbon wealth into developing its infrastructure on a major scale. From 1984 to 2020, the metropolitan area expanded eightfold while the amount of bare land decreased by half.

In 2003, Greater Doha's urban confines primarily clustered around the downtown core. However, a gradual westward expansion, encompassing segments of Al Rayyan Municipality, mirrored the city's demographic influx. This growth phase laid the groundwork for subsequent transformations of Greater Doha.

A notable a milestone in Greater Doha's urbanization was the 2006 Asian Games, which facilitated rapid urban development, directing attention towards the western districts and culminating in the development of the Aspire Zone. This urban sprawl coincided with new residential developments.

By 2007, Greater Doha's geographical boundaries had expanded further, enveloping extensive swathes of Al Daayen Municipality to the north. This sustained pattern of urbanization continued in the following years, characterized by progressions westward and northward. Since then, the traditional population centers of Greater Doha have shifted from densely populated downtown hubs to areas flanking the ring roads, encroaching into the neighboring municipalities of Al Rayyan and Al Daayen.
