= Al Rehayya =

Al Rehayya الرحية
- Village
- Location in Qatar
- Coordinates: 25.629747°N 51.46584°E
- Country: Qatar
- Municipality: Al Daayen
- Zone: Zone 70
- District no.: 288

Area
  - Total: 4.8 sq mi (12.4 km^{2})
- Elevation: 33 ft (10 m)

Al Rehayya (Arabic: الرحية, romanized: Ar Ruḩayyah) is a village in Qatar located in the municipality of Al Daayen.

Nearby settlements include Al Heedan in Al Khor Municipality to the north, Umm Swayya in Al Khor Municipality to the west, and Tenbek to the south.

== Etymology ==
The village's name derives from the Arabic word rehi, meaning "millstone". It received its name from a large, prominent rock in the village that looks similar to a millstone.
