= Al Kheesa =

Al Kheesa الخيسة
- Village
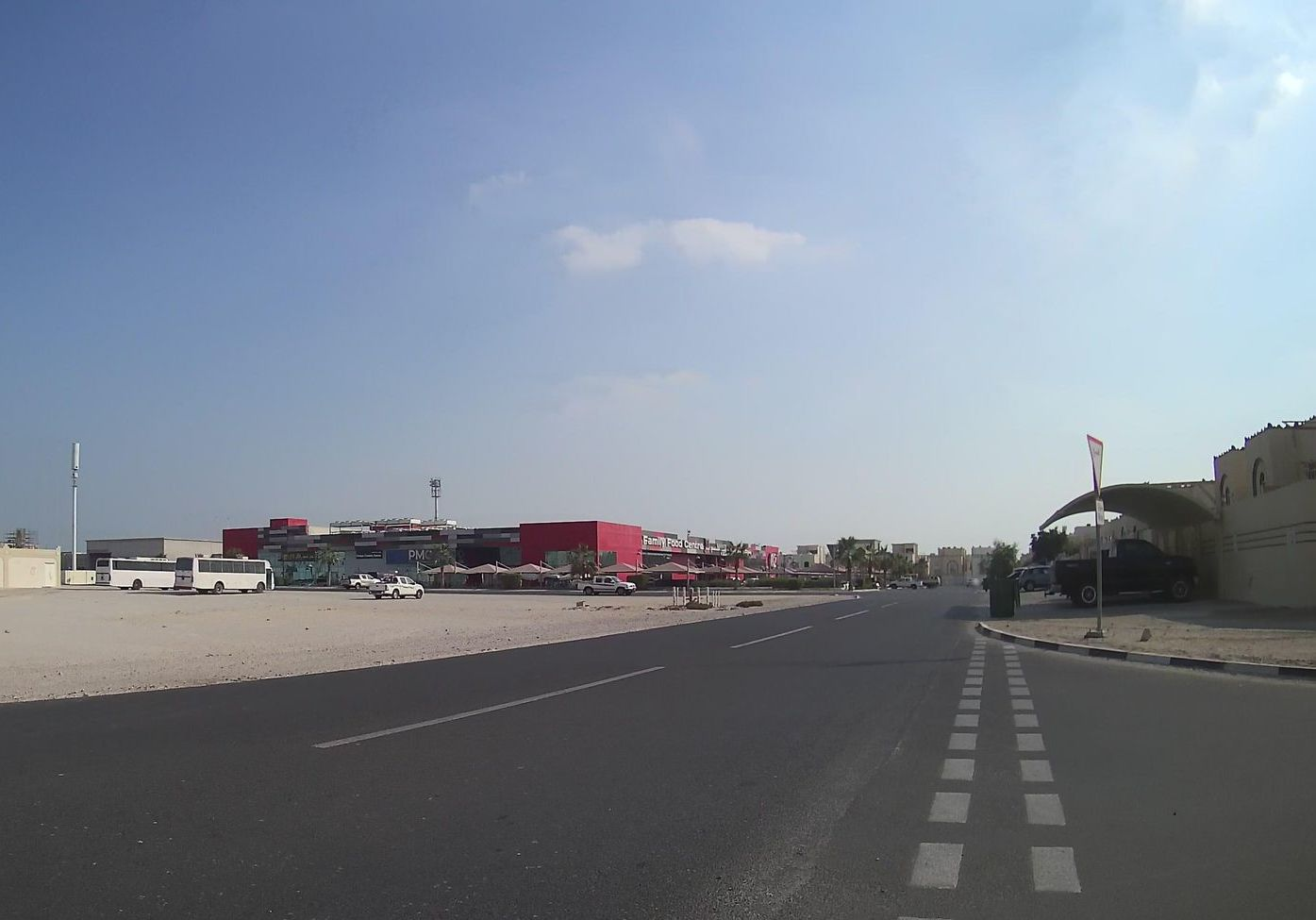
- 02 Mall on 773 Street in Al Kheesa

- Location within Qatar
- Coordinates: 25°25′3″N 51°27′32″E
- Country: Qatar
- Municipality: Al Daayen
- Zone: Zone 70
- District no.: 117

Area
  - Total: 7.0 km^{2} (2.7 sq mi)

Al Kheesa (Arabic: الخيسة, romanized: Al Khīsah) is a village in the municipality of Al Daayen in Qatar. It was demarcated in 1988. It is approximately 3 km south of Rawdat Al Hamama.

== Etymology ==
Al Kheesa derives its name from the Arabic word for "large garden". It was given this name because of its abundance of gardens and cedar trees.

== History ==
In J.G. Lorimer's 1908 publication Gazetteer of the Persian Gulf, he makes mention of "Khīsah" as a nomadic settlement situated "12 miles north-west of Dohah and 4 from the east coast". In the area he observed two unlined wells, 5 fathoms deep, of indifferent water.

== Infrastructure ==
Qatar Radio's first transmission station in 1968 was located in Al Kheesa. The village hosts the primary pumping station for the QR 3.63 billion North Doha Sewage Treatment Works, which is centered in Umm Salal Ali.

The village's historic architecture has faced a sharp decline in recent years as a result of neglect by the government. Al Daayen Municipality is developing Al Kheesa to serve as a residential hub for its southern sector. In the future, it is anticipated to house approximately 25,000 residents.

02 Mall is a popular attraction in Al Kheesa. A branch of Qatar's oldest supermarket chain, Family Food Centre, opened up in the mall in 2019.

== Transport ==
Currently, the elevated Al Kheesa Metro Station is under construction, having been launched during Phase 2A. Once completed, it will be part of Doha Metro's Green Line.
