= Al Sakhama =

Al Sakhama الصخامة
- Village
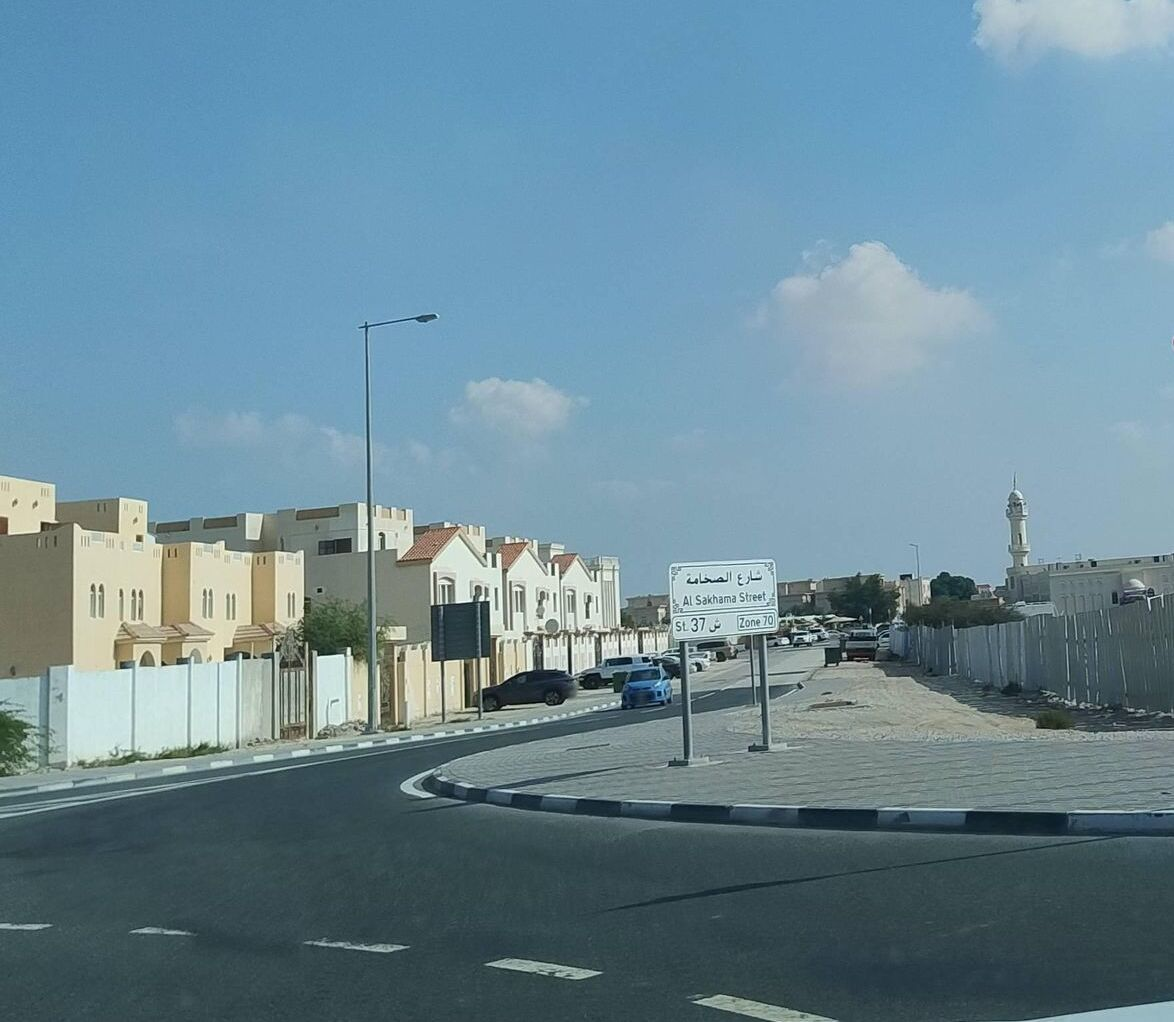
- Al Sakhama Street in Al Sakhama

- Al Sakhama
- Coordinates: 25°28′53″N 51°25′07″E
- Country: Qatar
- Municipality: Al Daayen
- Zone: Zone 70
- District no.: 120

Area
  - Total: 7.2 km^{2} (2.8 sq mi)

Al Sakhama (Arabic: الصخامة, romanized: As Sakhāmah) is a Qatari village in the municipality of Al Daayen. It lies close to the border with Umm Salal Municipality.

== Etymology ==
In Qatari Arabic dialect, the word sakhama translates to "coal". According to the Ministry of Municipality and Environment, the village received this name due to past coal mining operations. Conversely, the Encyclopedia of Qatari Information states that the term is used to refer to "land with black stones".

== History ==
In J.G. Lorimer's Gazetteer of the Persian Gulf, Al Sakhama is reported as a town 5 miles west of Lusail typified by a 4-acre garden containing approximately 300 date palms in 1908. The garden, which was said to have been established by Jassim bin Mohammed Al Thani, is described as being enclosed by a mud wall and surrounded on all sides by rows of tamarix trees. It was irrigated by eight large masonry wells, each of which were worked by a pair of donkeys. Additionally, it had a rest quarters for the gardeners and a tower which served as a rest place for Jassim bin Mohammed. Lorimer noted that it appeared to be one of the only seven sizable date palm plantations in Qatar.

After Jassim bin Mohammed's departure, ownership of the village was transferred to Jassim bin Sultan Al Thani, who planted several additional palm trees in the area. Although the village was typified by a rawda (or depression) where small amounts of water would collect, and also had masonry wells constructed in its vicinity, the water was high in salinity; thus the vegetation could not be sustained without costly irrigation mechanisms. This caused many inhabitants to abandon the village in the early-to-mid 20th century.

Despite the steady development of housing infrastructure throughout the 21st century, residents have expressed concerns about the delay in essential public services. As of 2021, the area had issues with paved roads and street lighting and had a shortage of commercial outlets, mosques, schools, and public parks.

== Education ==
The following school is located in Al Sakhama:

Name of School	Curriculum	Grade	Genders	Official Website	Ref
Umm Salal Boys Model School	Independent	Primary	Male-only	N/A	
