= Rawdat Al Hamama =

Rawdat Al Hamama روضة الحمام
- Village
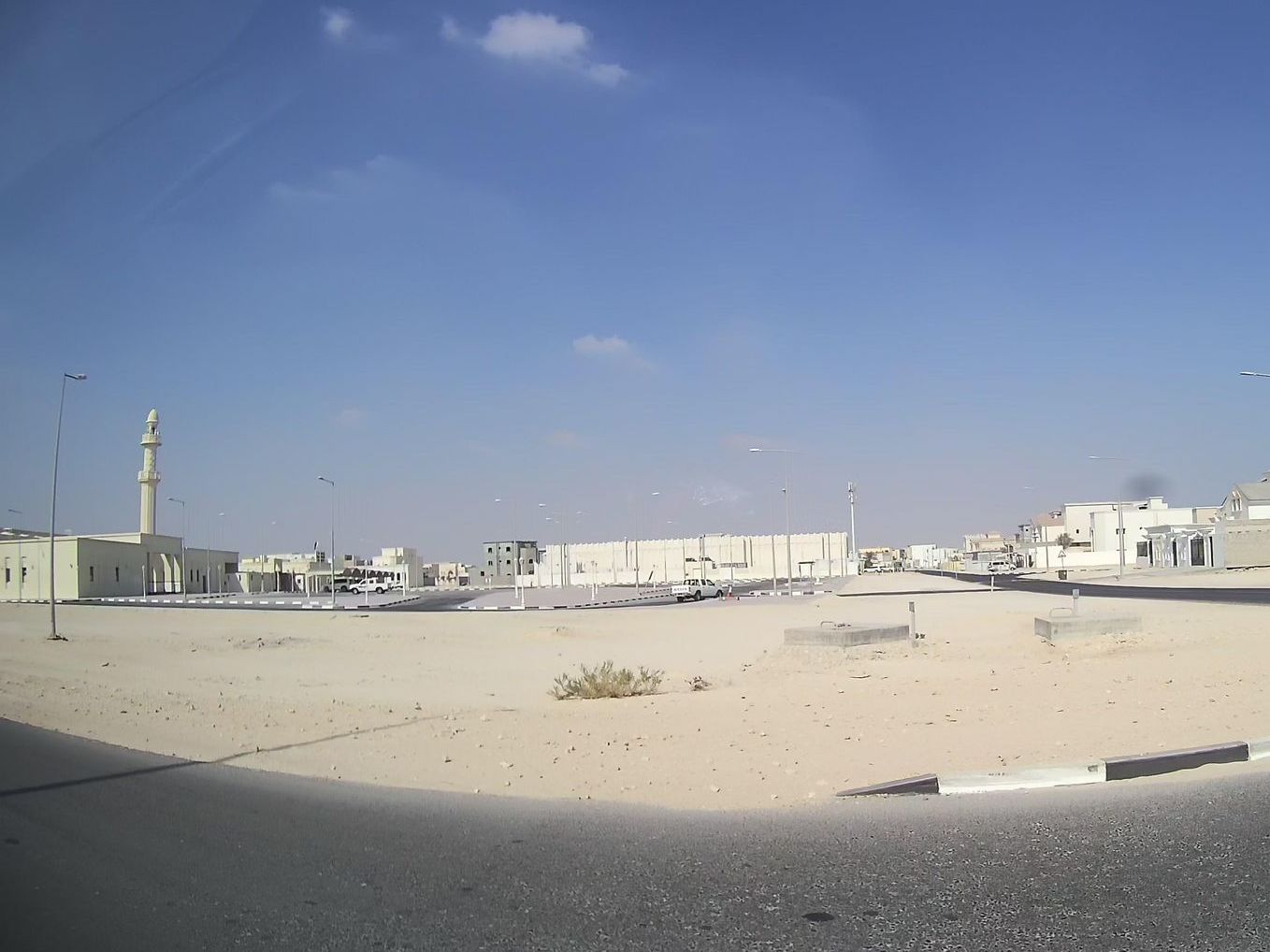
- View of 1330 Street in Rawdat Al Hamama

- Location within Qatar
- Coordinates: 25°26′46″N 51°28′7″E
- Country: Qatar
- Municipality: Al Daayen
- Zone: Zone 70
- District no.: 119

Area
  - Total: 15.3 km^{2} (5.9 sq mi)

Rawdat Al Hamama (Arabic: روضة الحمام, romanized: Rawḑat al Hamama) is a Qatari village in the municipality of Al Daayen. It is located between two major highways: Al Khor Expressway and Al Shamal Road. The government has launched major developments in the village, including a housing subdivision with a target capacity of 30,000 residents.

== Etymology ==
The first part of its name, rawdat, is the Arabic term used for a depression. Hamāma is Arabic for dove.

== Geography ==
It is located in the southern section of the municipality, 3 km north of Al Kheesa and about 10 km north of Doha. It has some vegetation in the form of trees and grasses and is used as a farming area. It is also used as a grazing area for camels and sheep.

== History ==
J.G. Lorimer's Gazetteer of the Persian Gulf, written in 1908, has an entry for Rawdat Al Hamama, referring to it simply as "Al Hamāma". He gives its location as 12 miles north of Doha and 2 from the east coast. Few details are offered of it, except that it is a camping ground for Bedouins and has a masonry well which yields brackish water at 2 fathoms deep.

== Infrastructure ==
There are hundreds of residential housing units in the village. Car accidents are common in the area due to a lack of light poles and the narrowness of the roads, some of which are unpaved. In 2017, the government carried out infrastructure works in the village which witnessed improvements made to its roughly 19.5 kilometres (12.1 mi) road system as part of the first stage of construction. In addition to paving several streets, approximately 330 road signs and 790 light poles were put in place. A drainage system of 15 kilometres (9.3 mi) was also installed. The value of contracts handed out for the first phase was QR 345 million.

== Developments ==
Currently, the area is being developed as a major mixed-use center for Al Daayen's southern sector. In particular, the village is undergoing developments to serve the retail and administrative needs of the residents of nearby Al Kheesa. A low-density housing scheme was launched in 2010 and aims at serving up to 30,000 residents.

The Qatar National Master Plan (QNMP) is described as a "spatial representation of the Qatar National Vision 2030". As part of the QNMP's Urban Centre plan, which aims to implement development strategies in 28 central hubs that will serve their surrounding communities, Rawdat Al Hamama has been designated a District Centre, which is the lowest designation.

Rawdat Al Hamama's District Centre is set to be constructed to the immediate east of the housing development launched in 2010. The overall area of the District Centre is relatively large and mostly consists of a lightly-grassed field. It will be a mid-point between Lusail and Umm Salal, and thus public transport and road infrastructure are major aspects of the master plan. Structures that will be erected as part of the plan include a primary boys' school, a primary girls' school, a 12,760 m^{2} public health centre, a large 91,981 m^{2} public park, a youth centre and civil defense facilities.

== Historic landmarks ==
=== Abandoned farmhouse ===
There is an abandoned farmhouse in Rawdat Al Hamama which was originally constructed in 1945. Enclosed by walls and facing a large central courtyard, the house is rectangular and measures 22 by 29 m. It has three rooms which are accessible through the courtyard. There are no ornamental features in either the house or compound. The house is considered to be representative of North Arabian architecture during the mid-20th century.
