= Zone 70, Qatar =

Zone 70
- Zone
- Interactive map of Zone 70
- Coordinates: 25.530182°N 51.444396°E
- Country: Qatar
- Municipality: Al Daayen
- Blocks: 292

Area
  - Total: 239.1 km^{2} (92.3 sq mi)

Population
  - Total: 53,001 (2,015)
- Time zone: UTC+03 (Arabia Standard Time)
- ISO 3166 code: QA-ZA

Zone 70 is a zone of the municipality of Al Daayen in the state of Qatar. The main districts recorded in the 2015 population census were Leabaib, Al Ebb, Jeryan Jenaihat, Al Kheesa, Rawdat Al Hamama, Wadi Al Wasaah, Al Sakhama, Al Masrouhiya, Wadi Lusail, Lusail, Umm Qarn, and Al Daayen.

Other districts which fall within its administrative boundaries are Al Rehayya, Qaryat Al Lusail Al Shamaliya, and Tenbek.

== Demographics ==
Year	Population
1986	2,408
1997	3,411
2004	7,711
2010	43,176
2015	53,001

== Land use ==
The Ministry of Municipality and Environment (MME) breaks down land use in the zone as follows.

Area (km^{2})	Developed land (km^{2})	Undeveloped land (km^{2})	Residential (km^{2})	Commercial/ Industrial (km^{2})	Education/ Health (km^{2})	Farming/ Green areas (km^{2})	Other uses (km^{2})
239.10	110.15	128.94	10.62	1.08	0.68	23.42	74.35
