= Al Daayen =

Municipality in Qatar

Al Daayen الضعاين
- Municipality
- Map of Qatar with Al-Daayen highlighted
- Coordinates (Umm Qarn village): 25°34′40″N 51°27′0″E
- Country: Qatar
- Capital: Umm Qarn
- Zones: 2

Government
  - Mayor: Rashid Alhajri

Area
  - Total: 304.3 km^{2} (117.5 sq mi)

Population (2015)
  - Total: 54,339
  - Density: 178.6/km^{2} (462.5/sq mi)
- Time zone: UTC+3 (AST)
- ISO 3166 code: QA-ZA

Al Daayen (Arabic: الضعاين [ALA-LC: al-Ḍaʻāyin; Wehr: aḍ-ḍaʿāyin]; also spelled as الظعاين [ALA-LC: al-Ẓaʻāyin; Wehr: aẓ-ẓaʿāyin]) is a municipality in Qatar. Most of the urban landscape can be found in the southern zone of the municipality, particularly in the city of Lusail, while the northern and central sections are primarily rural. It is one of the fastest growing municipalities in Qatar due to its close proximity to the capital Doha.

Umm Qarn hosts the municipal office and serves as the municipality's administrative seat.

== Etymology ==
Al Daayen Municipality is named after the village of the same name. Two theories are offered for the name. According to the Ministry of Municipality and Environment, the village derives its name from the Arabic word dhaayen, which roughly translates to "travel". It was given this name in reference to the Qatari tribes who abandoned the village and traveled elsewhere in search of water and suitable pasture. The second theory, given in the Encyclopedia of Qatari Information, states that the name is derived from an Arabic term used to denote a place for camels to rest.

== History ==
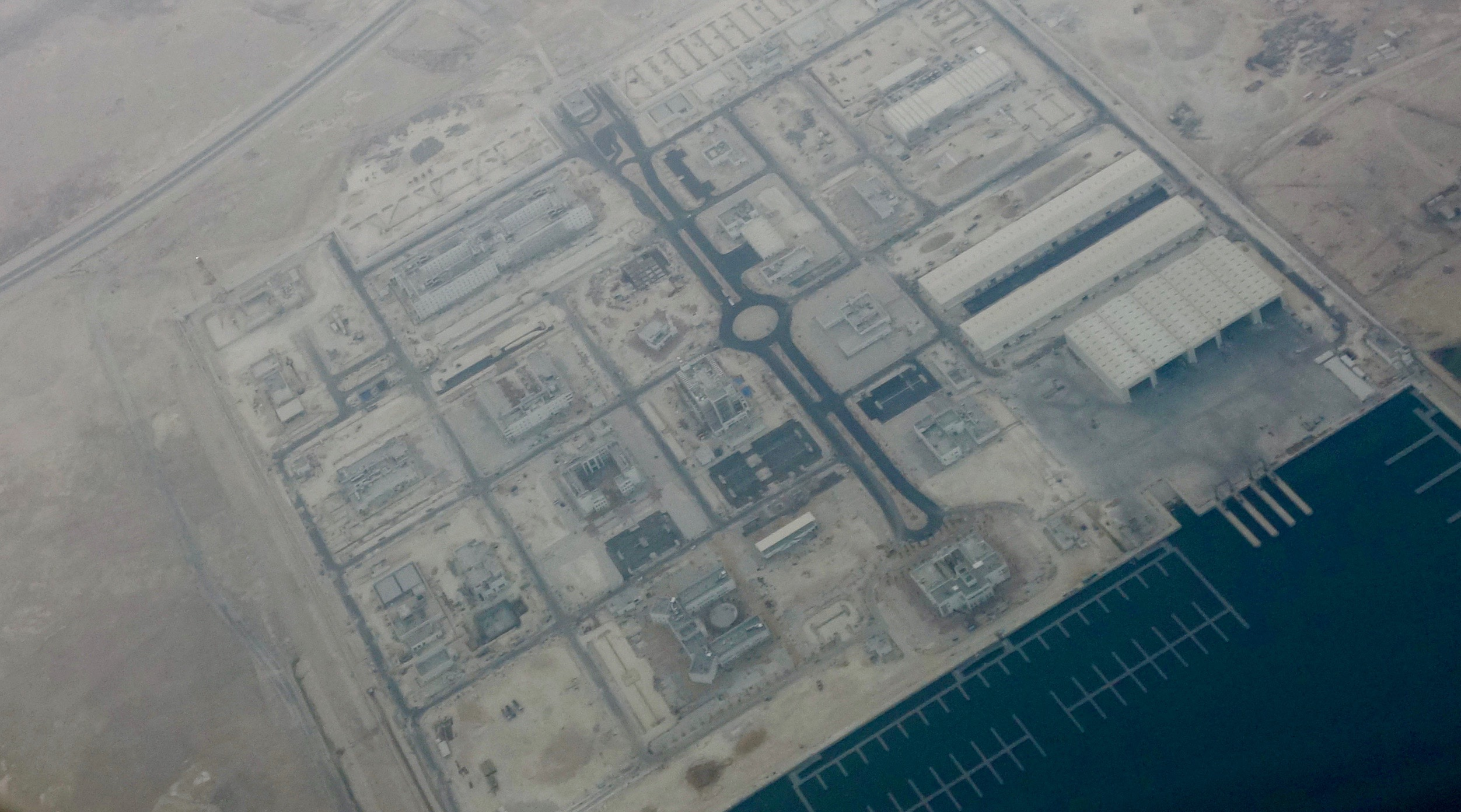
Aerial view of Al Daayen Village in 2017.

The demographic and urban growth of the country over recent years necessitated the creation of Al Daayen Municipality. The Emir of Qatar ratified the government's resolution 13 in 2004 on the creation of the municipality.

Initial development centered on the southern sector of Al Daayen, which is a part of the Doha Metropolitan Area. Early construction was scattered, often leaving developed and undeveloped sections adjacent to each other.

== Geography ==
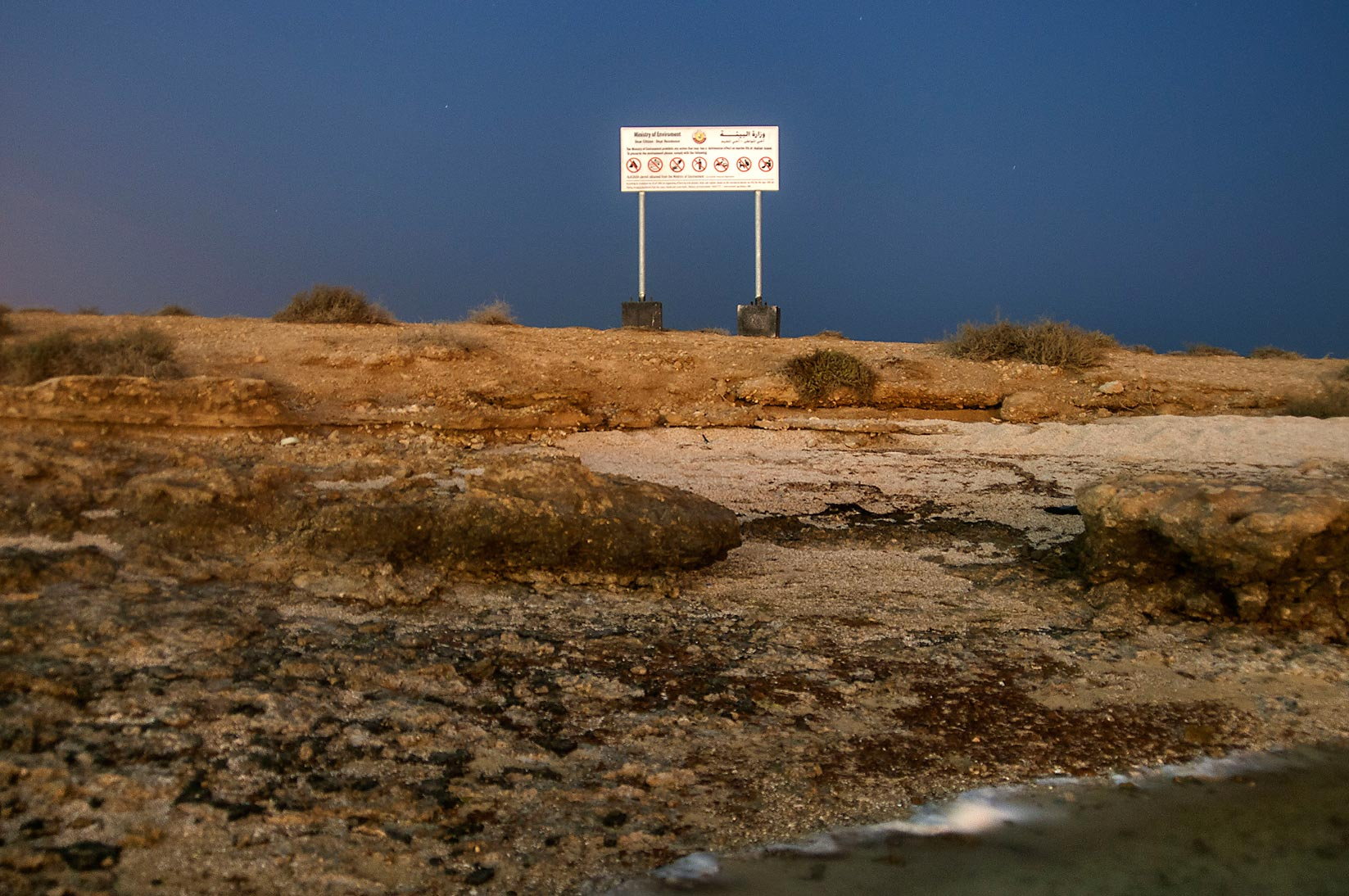
Coastline of Al Aaliya Island, east of Lusail.

Situated alongside Qatar's eastern coastline, the municipality is bordered by Doha to the south, Al Khor to the north, and Umm Salal to the west. An overwhelming portion of the municipality is located within Doha Metropolitan Area boundaries. Three main divisions exist within the municipality between the northern, central and southern parts. The municipality accounts for roughly 2.5% of Qatar's total area.

According to the Ministry of Municipality and Environment (MME), the municipality accommodates 19 rawdas, which were historically popular spots for settlements as they were typically rich in vegetation due to water and sediment run-off. No less than eight of Al Daayen's villages were established near or on rawdas, including Al Rehayya, Al Sakhama and Al Masrouhiya. Upwards of 15 wadis were recorded, a notable one being Wadi Al Banat. Other geographic features listed include four jeris (places where water flows) one plain, four hills, two sabkhas, and two capes. Two natural islands are found off its shores, Al Jazira (lit. 'The Island') and Al Aaliya Island.

In the central portion, where most of the municipality's coastline is found, an open desert landscape is predominant. Large swathes of the central-east are dedicated to the Al Wusail Environmental Protected Area.

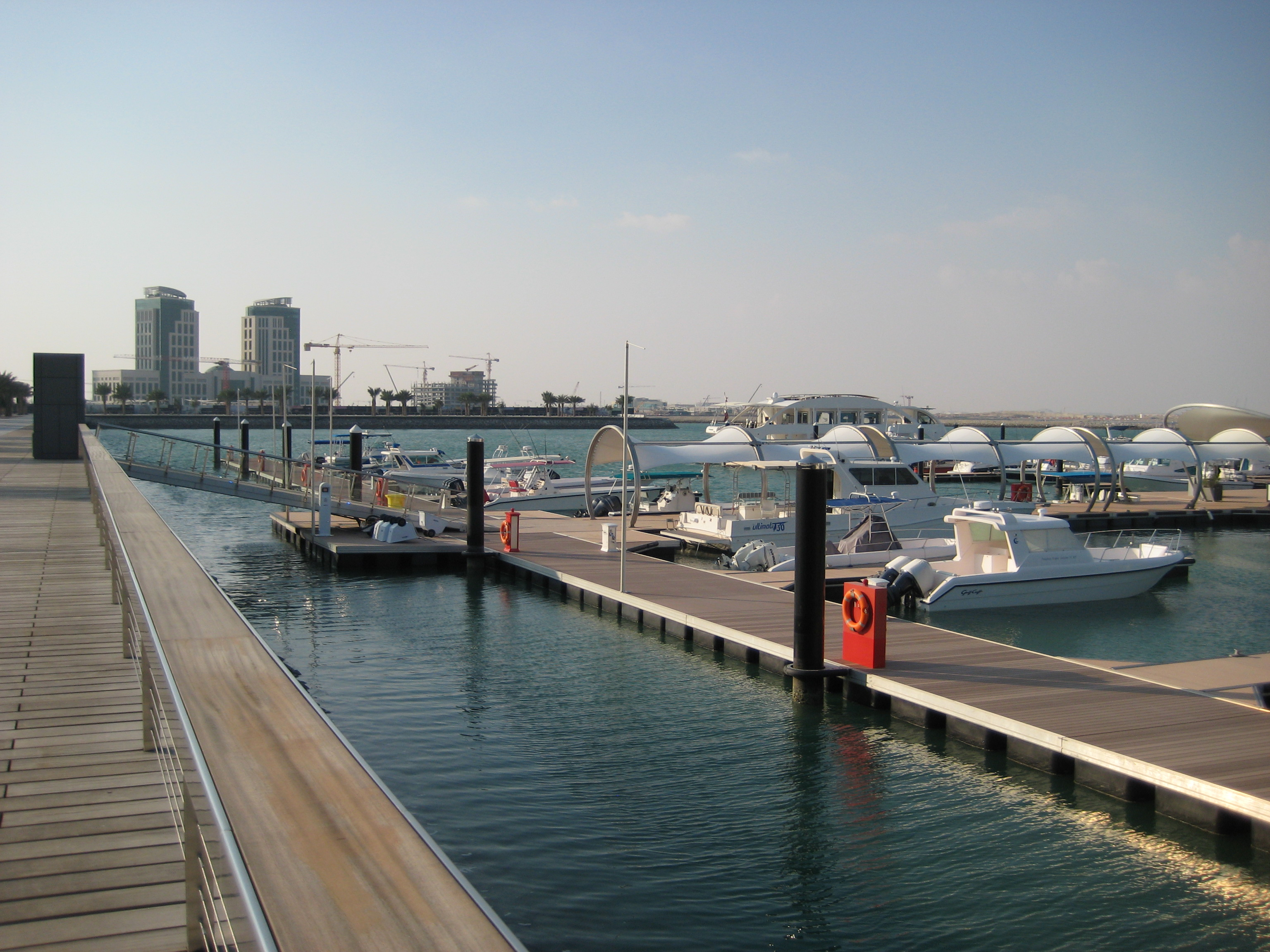
Boats docked in Lusail's Marina district.

Northern Al Daayen is typified by agriculture, being dotted by several farms and a few small settlements. Among the most important rural settlements are Tenbek, Jarian, Umm Swaya and Umm Qarn. Umm Qarn is being developed to serve as the nerve center for the northern section, mainly because it is the most developed northern village, already accommodating the municipal office, a primary health center and two primary schools.

Metropolitan Doha infringes into the highly urbanized southern section of Al Daayen. This area serves as the residential and economic hub of the municipality, with the planned city of Lusail being the focal point, having a prospective population capacity of 200,000. Rawdat Al Hamama, Al Ebb and Leabaib are also being developed as major mixed use centers for the southern area.

== Administration ==
The municipality is divided into 2 zones which are then divided into 385 blocks. The villages of Simaisma and Al Jeryan are geographically located in Al Daayen but serve as administrative zones for Al Khor.

As of 2024, Rashid Alhajri is the mayor of Al Daayen Municipality.

=== Administrative zones ===
Approximate locations of the main districts in Al Daayen.

The following zones were recorded in the 2015 population census:

Zone no.	Census districts	Area (km²)	Population (2015)
69	Jabal Thuaileb; Al Kharayej; Lusail; Al Egla; Wadi Al Banat	51.1	1,338
70	Leabaib; Al Ebb; Jeryan Jenaihat; Al Kheesa; Rawdat Al Hamama; Wadi Al Wasaah; Al Sakhama; Al Masrouhiya; Wadi Lusail; Lusail; Umm Qarn; Al Daayen	239.1	53,001
Municipality		290.2	54,339

=== Districts ===
Other settlements in Al Daayen include:

- Al Aaliya Island (Arabic: جزيرة العالية)
- Al Rehayya (Arabic: الرحية)
- Qaryat Al Lusail Al Shamaliya (Arabic: قرية اللوسيل الشمالية)
- Tenbek (Arabic: تنبك)

== Infrastructure ==
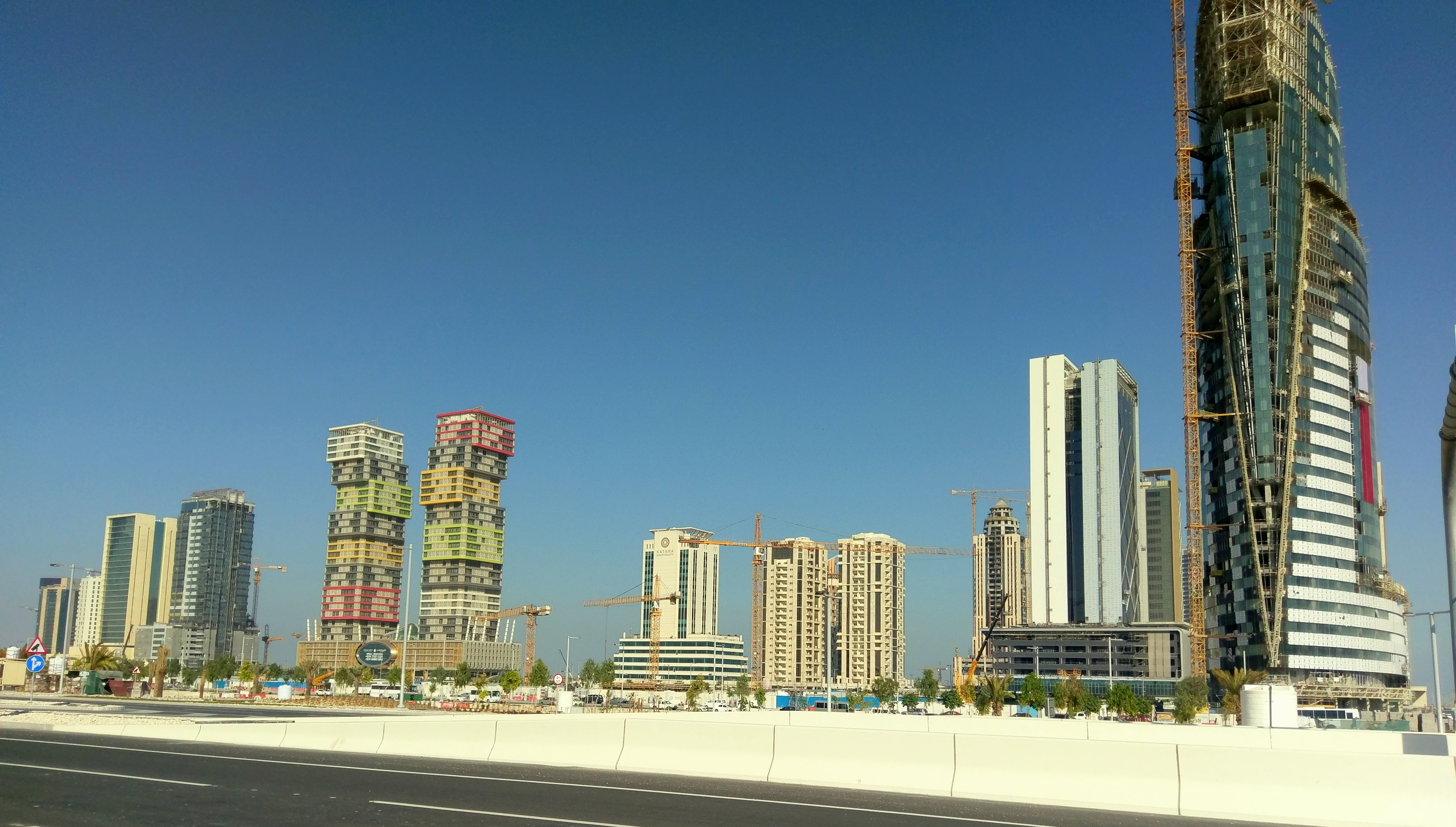
Construction in Lusail.

Infrastructure in Al Daayen has witnessed massive improvements in recent years, with its number of buildings increasing three-fold from 1987 to 2010. Of the 3,151 buildings recorded in the 2010 census, 92% of these were residential while 8% were commercial. Villas made up 57% of the residential units, followed by traditional houses at 29% and other types of housing constituting the remainder. Only 24% of the buildings were constructed prior to 2000, with the rest being built from 2000 to 2010. Partly due to the majority of utilities projects in Lusail being completed only after the census was taken, none of the residential buildings recorded had access to sewage, 79.4% had access to water and 97.8% had access to electricity.

=== Government offices ===
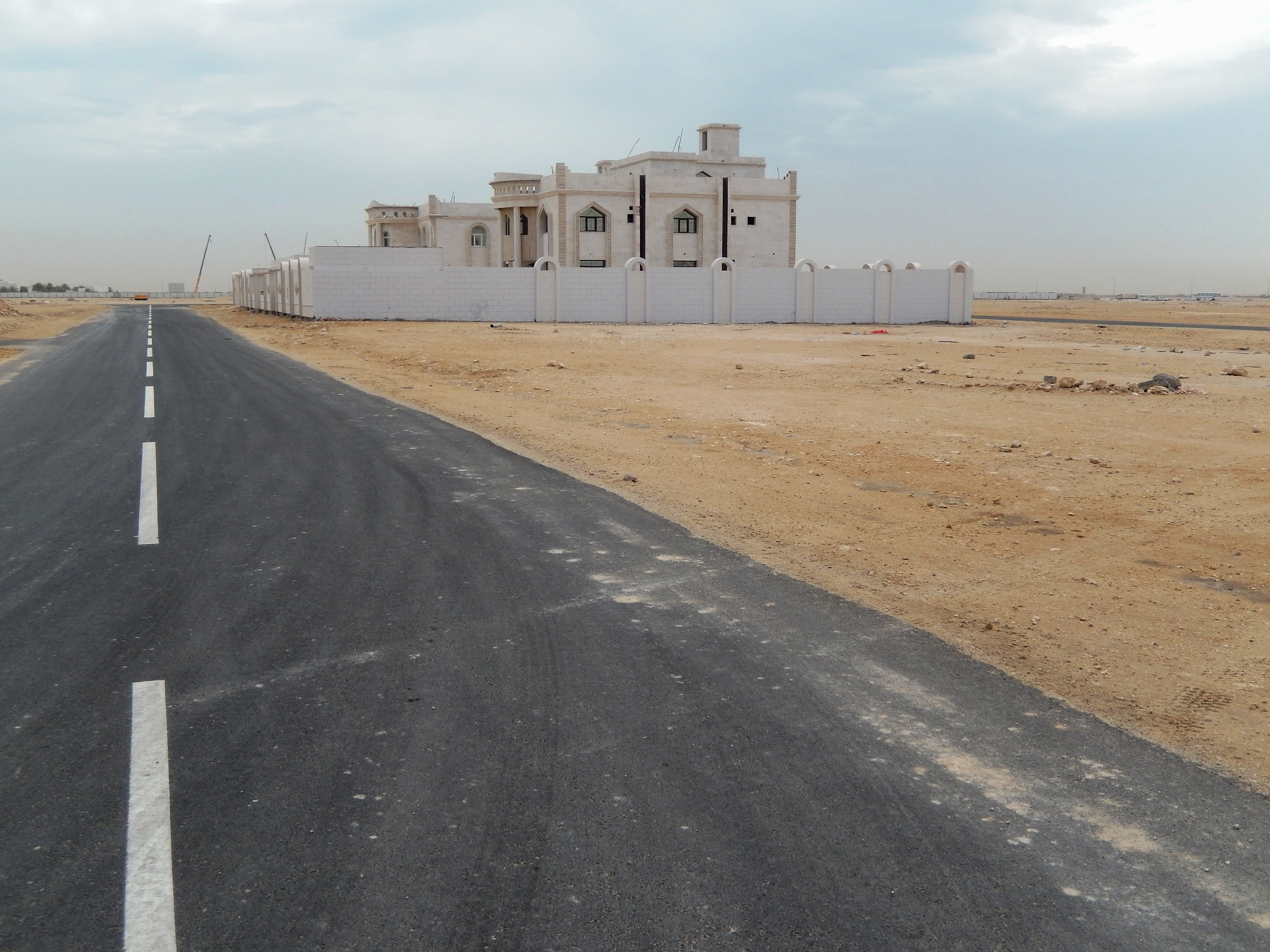
Large villas in Umm Qarn, the municipal seat.

Statistics published by the Ministry of Municipality and Environment indicate that there 24 government offices in the municipality in 2010.

The construction of a public services complex at Al Daayen was initiated in 2007 with a planned completion date of 2009. This complex includes the main municipal office and all of the municipal's government offices. Centered in Umm Qarn on an area of 19,500 square meters, this complex also has a health center, a police station, a fire station and a mosque. Designed with traditional elements in order to reflect Qatari architecture, many local tree species such as palm trees, neems and cedars have been planted throughout the complex, resulting in the complex winning the architecture prize for municipal projects at the 2010 conference of the Organization of Islamic Capitals & Cities.

== Education ==
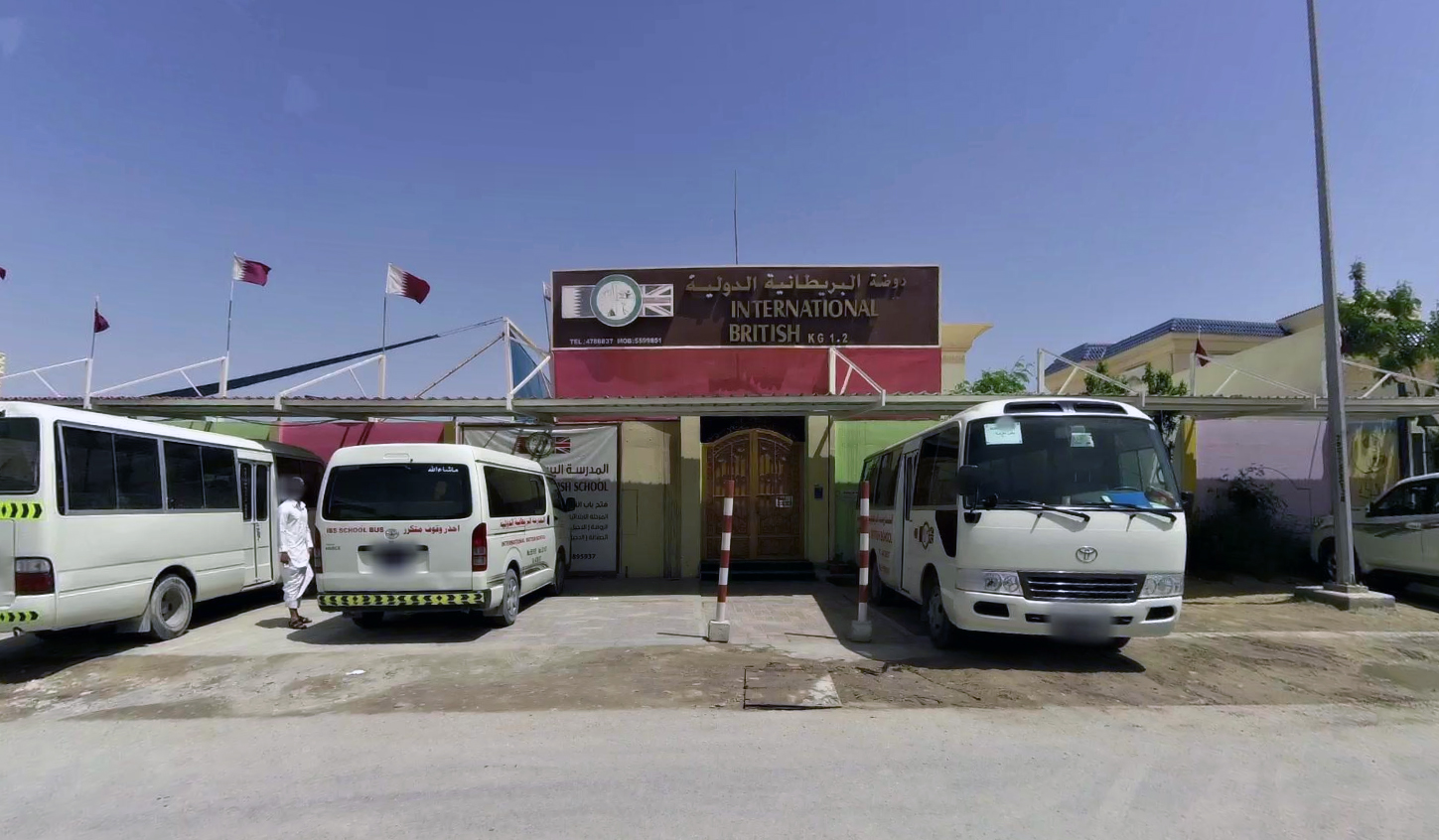
International British School in Al Kheesa.

Public schools in Al Daayen amounted to 16 as recorded in the 2016 education census – 9 were exclusively for girls and 7 were for boys. More than twice as many students were female, at 4,261 compared to 2,034 male students.

As part of Lusail's master plan, the city is ultimately set to contain 36 schools with a capacity for 26,000 students. Upwards of 75,000 square meters has already been reserved for school buildings by the Lusail City Real Estate Development Company; these schools are expected to be commissioned by 2019. Al Daayen joined the UNESCO Global Network of Learning Cities in 2022.

== Healthcare ==
There is one primary healthcare facility in Al Daayen: the Al Daayen Health Center in Umm Qarn's public services complex. Also within this complex is a Pediatric Emergency Center. In Lusail, construction of the American Hospital is currently underway.

The municipality has been announced as a possible site for the nation's second 'medical city' after Hamad Medical City.

== Economy ==
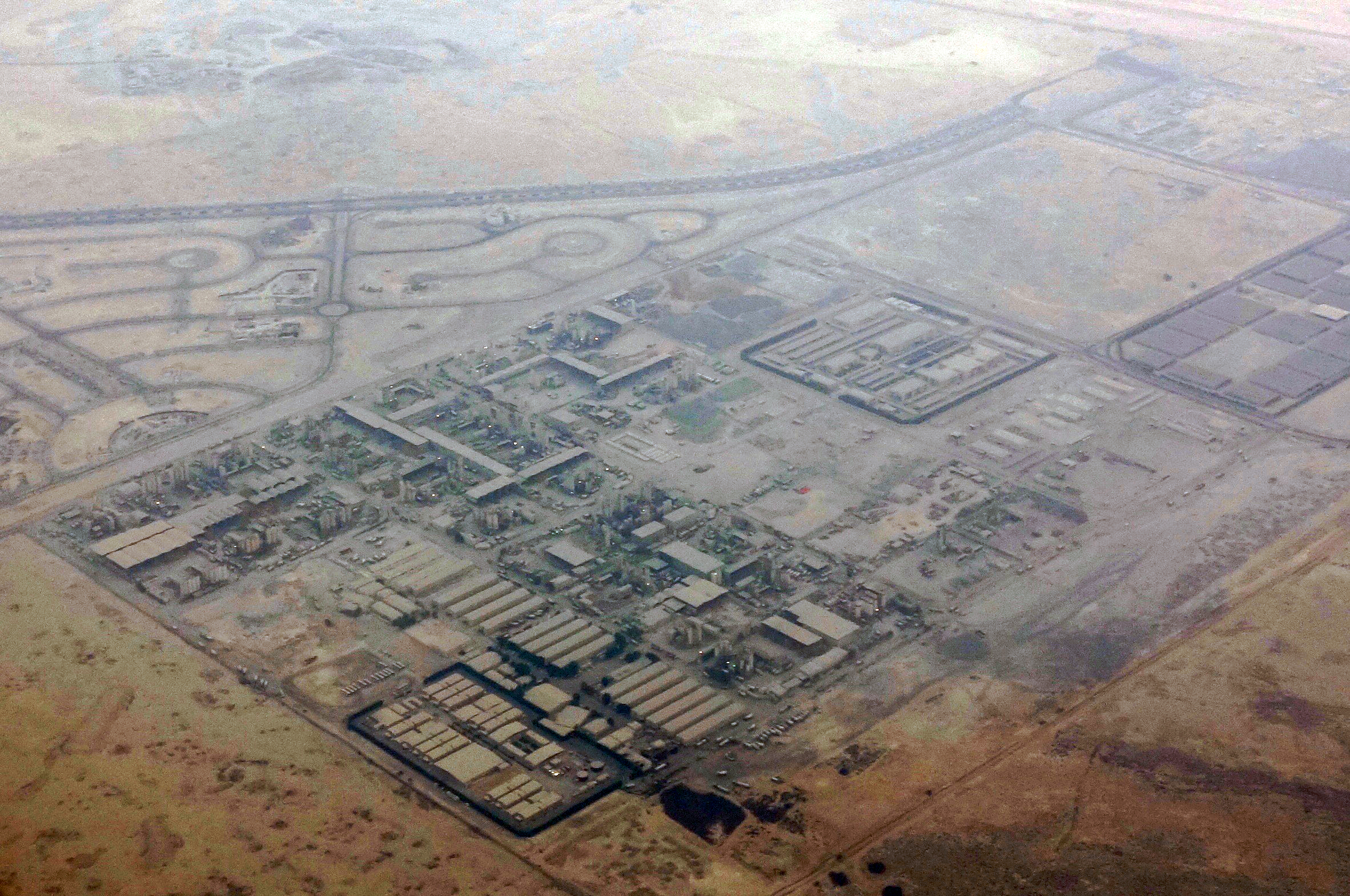
Aerial view of industries at Lusail.

In 2010, 81.7% of the population was economically active. Construction was the primary industry worked in by most of the working population at 21,702 employees, followed by public administration and defense (2,336) and agriculture and fishing (1,294).

The MEEZA Data Center is an IT center south of Umm Qarn. Inaugurated in 2014, it spans an area of 10,000 square meters, making it MEEZA's largest data center.

Energy City in Lusail, designed to be a focal point for oil and gas companies, is currently being developed in Al Daayen. First unveiled in March 2006, the $2.6 billion city will host as many as 92 company offices as well as corporate housing. In July 2013, CEO of Energy City Hesham Al Emadi revealed that, as a result of many requests for office space by non energy-related companies, the city will be converted to a mixed-use facility.

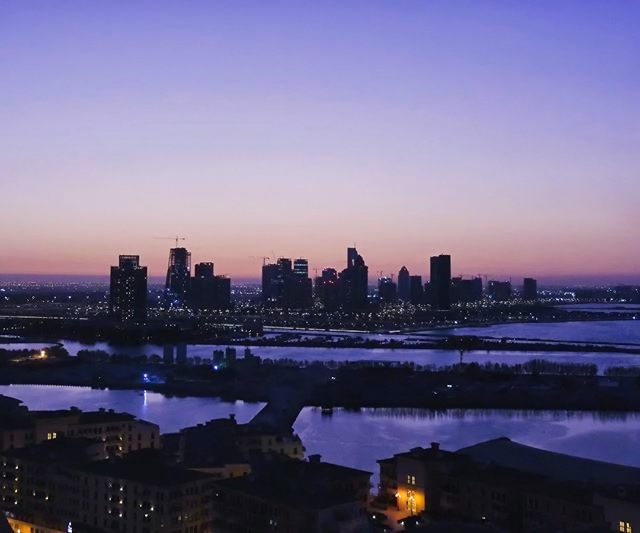
Skyline of the Jabal Thuaileb (Fox Hills) district of Lusail at dusk.

Numerous non-energy related companies are also headquartered in Lusail. Hotel operator and developer Katara Hospitality is based in the city, as is Qatari Diar Real Estate Investment Company and its subsidiaries, such as Lusail Real Estate Development Company and utilities company Marafeq Qatar. Qatari Diar was responsible for launching the Lusail City Development Project in 2005. In 2002, Lusail and its suburbs of Al Kharayej and Jabal Thuaileb became the first three areas of Qatar where foreigners could own real estate.

The Lusail Industrial Area hosts many construction companies. In the Lusail Ready-Mix Batching Plant Zone, two ready-mix batching plants are maintained by Qatar Alpha Beton Ready Mix, one ready-mix batching plant is maintained by SMEET, REDCO owns a precast plant, Qatar Concrete has 1 ready-mix batching plant, and HBK ReMIX operates a ready-mix factory.

Agriculture plays a relatively insignificant role in local economy compared to Qatar's other municipalities. Al Daayen's farms accounted for roughly 5% of Qatar's total farms in 2010. Municipal statistics indicate that there were 52 farms at the time of the 2010 census, whereas the Ministry of Municipality & Planning recorded 47 farms. The majority of farms are centered near Umm Qarn, along with small amounts of farmland being scattered around Rawdat Al Hamama, Wadi Al Wasaah and Jeryan Jenaihat.

== Transportation ==
=== Public transportation ===
There is a lack of public transportation throughout the municipality. Bicycle routes and bus stops are also lacking. The municipality's master plan has highlighted the creation of bicycle routes and the improvement of public transportation as a development priority.

Lusail intends for water taxis to become the main form of public transportation in the city as it is planned to have 30 km of developed coastline.

=== Roads ===
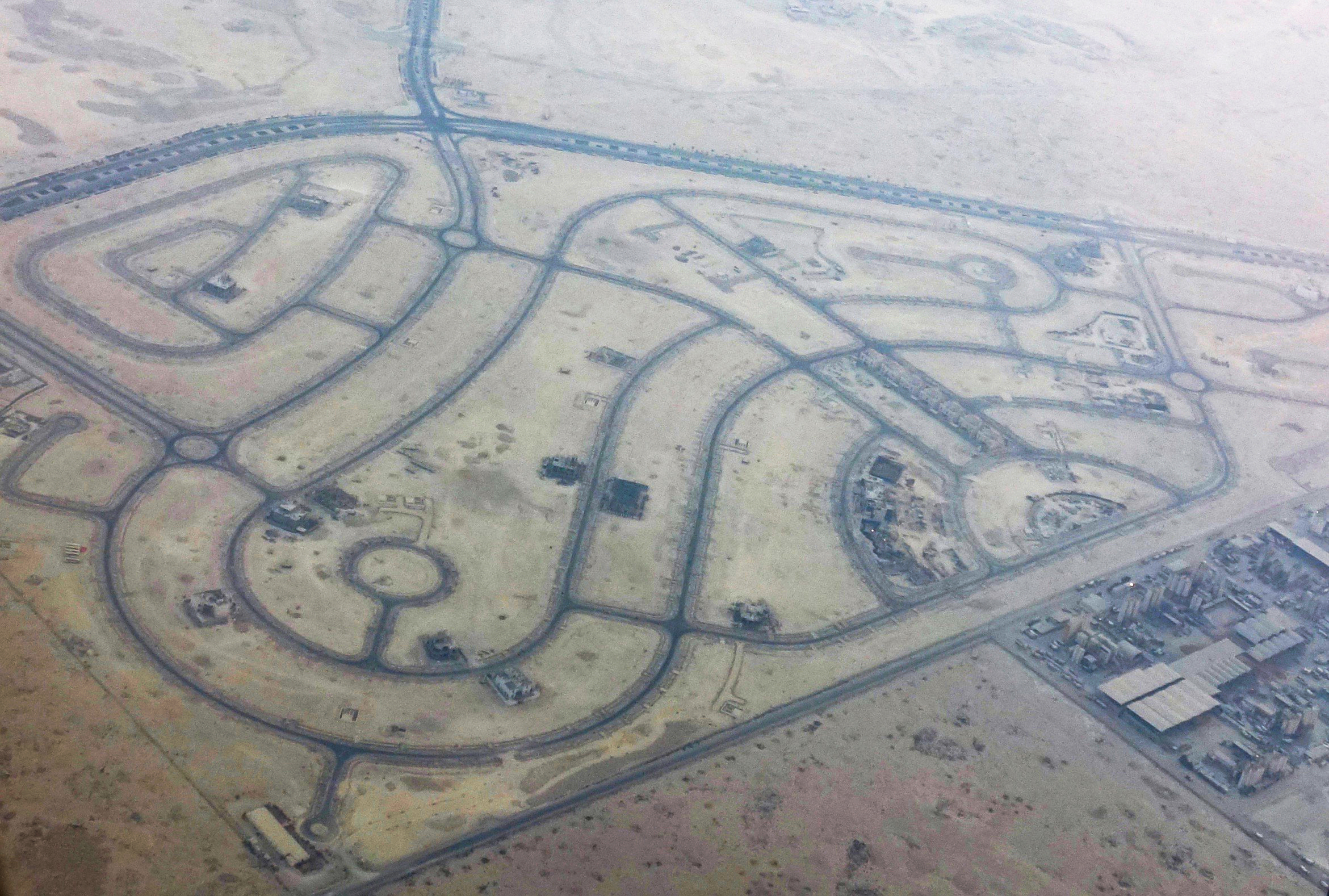
Roads in the North Residential District of Lusail.

Al Shamal Road runs through the western portion of Al Daayen, while Al Khor Coastal Road runs through the central and eastern sections. The latter is the arterial road that connects the coastal settlements, such as Lusail, with Doha.

=== Rail ===
Doha Metro's Red Line will run through Lusail once completed, providing its residents with convenient access to Doha and Al Wakrah. Qatar Rail is involved in the construction of the Lusail Tram. First designed in August 2007, the Lusail Tram will be spread over a distance of 33.1 km, of which 10.4 km will be underground and the remaining 22.7 km will be overground. The network will connect to the Doha Metro Red Line through the Lusail Main Station and the Lusail Marina Station. In June 2018, Qatar Rail reported that the Lusail Tram was 77% complete and should be operational by 2020.

Private transportation will remain the preferred method of transport for the municipality's pastoral settlements in the north due to the lack of planned rail infrastructure in this region.

== Sports ==
Lusail International Circuit, a motor racing circuit, is centered in the municipality. Other sporting venues include Lusail Shooting Club and Lusail Sports Arena. Future sporting projects include the Lusail Sports Precinct, a massive sporting complex containing sporting venues as well as residential units, and Lusail Iconic Stadium, a proposed venue for the 2022 FIFA World Cup.

== Visitor attractions ==
According to the Ministry of Municipality and Environment, the municipality hosts 7 parks as of 2018.

A large-scale museum is planned to be constructed in Lusail's Entertainment Island district.

Historic sites of interest can be found in the traditional villages of Umm Qarn, Tenbek and Al Rehayya and in a few deserted fishing villages located to the north of Lusail.

== Demographics ==
Al Daayen has seen a rapid increase in population in recent years. Government officials estimated that the population would increase from 43,175 in 2010 to 173,000 in 2017; a total addition of 130,000 inhabitants. This increase was attributed to the development of Lusail and the numerous housing plots being awarded in the city as part of the Qatari National Housing Program. Most residents work outside of the municipality's borders.

In 2010, males accounted for 79.5% of the population of 43,175 while females made up 20.5% of the population. The overall literacy rate was 94.39%. Age-wise, 11.2% of the population was under 15 and the remaining 88.8% was above the age of 15.
