= Wadi Al Banat =

Wadi Al Banat وادي البنات
- District
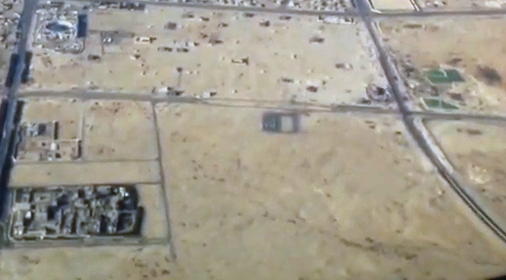
- Aerial view of southern section of Wadi Al Banat

- Wadi Al Banat
- Coordinates: 25°24′22″N 51°27′36″E
- Country: Qatar
- Municipality: Al Daayen / Doha
- Zone: Zone 69
- District no.: 112

Area
  - Total: 9.7 km^{2} (3.7 sq mi)

Wadi Al Banat (Arabic: وادي البنات, romanized: Wādī al Banāt) is a district in Qatar, geographically located in the municipality of Al Daayen but also a census-designated district of Doha. It is situated near the borders with Doha Municipality and Umm Salal Municipality.

== Etymology ==
Wadi Al Banat's name means "valley of the girls" in Arabic, and was thought to have been named that because it was a popular play area for young girls.

== Infrastructure ==
Qatar Fuel (WOQOD) opened a vehicle inspection center in Wadi Al Banat in December 2014 at a cost of QAR 23 million. It occupies an area of 7,500 sq meters and its facilities include a security office, parking area, and customer lounge.

== Education ==
The Doha Institute for Graduate Studies is located on Al Tarfa Street in Wadi Al Banat.
