= Umm Qarn =

Umm Qarn أم قرن
- Village
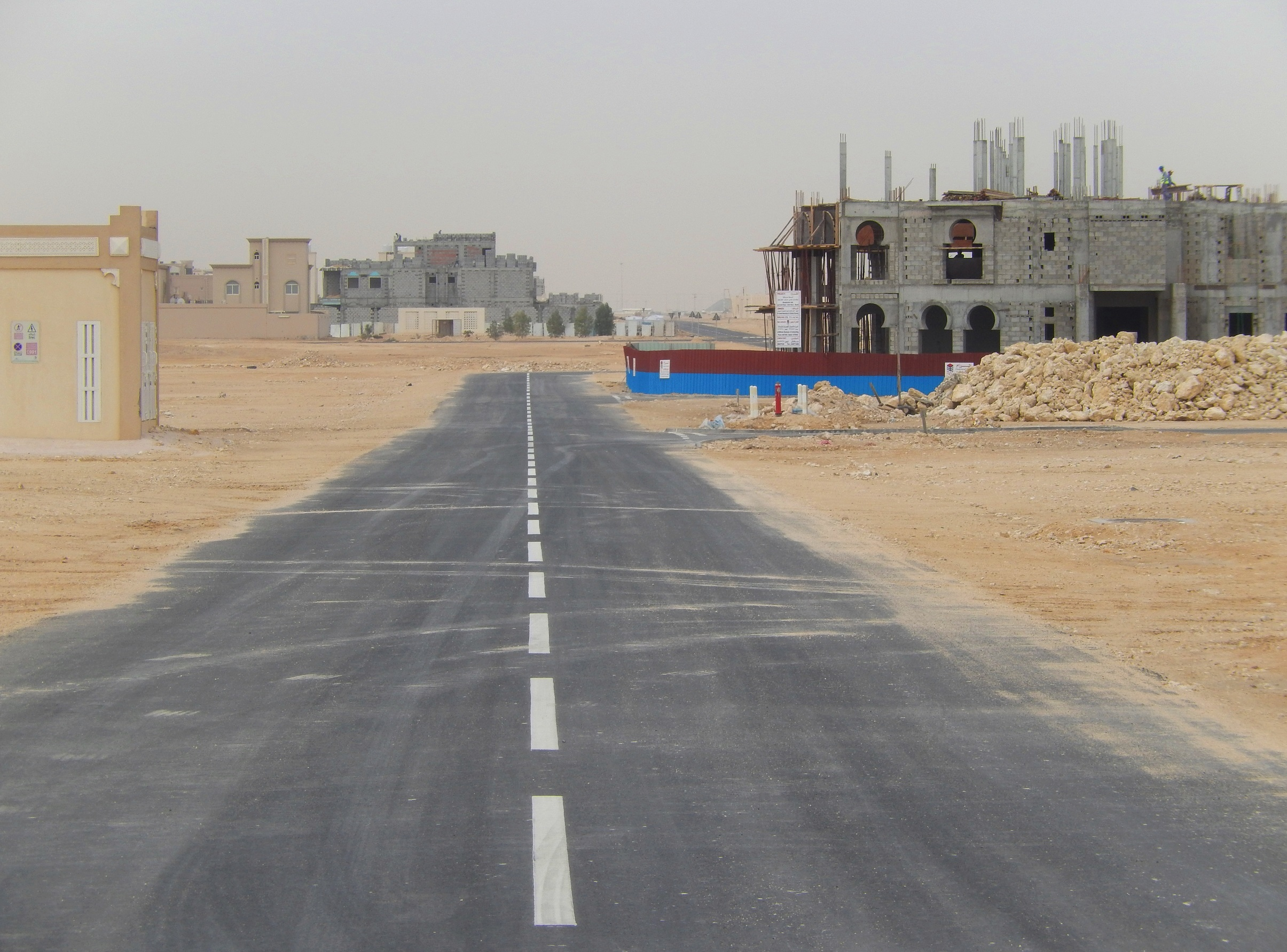
- Residential area in Umm Qarn

- Umm Qarn
- Coordinates: 25°34′40″N 51°27′0″E
- Country: Qatar
- Municipality: Al Daayen
- Zone: Zone 70
- District no.: 126

Area
  - Total: 11.4 km^{2} (4.4 sq mi)

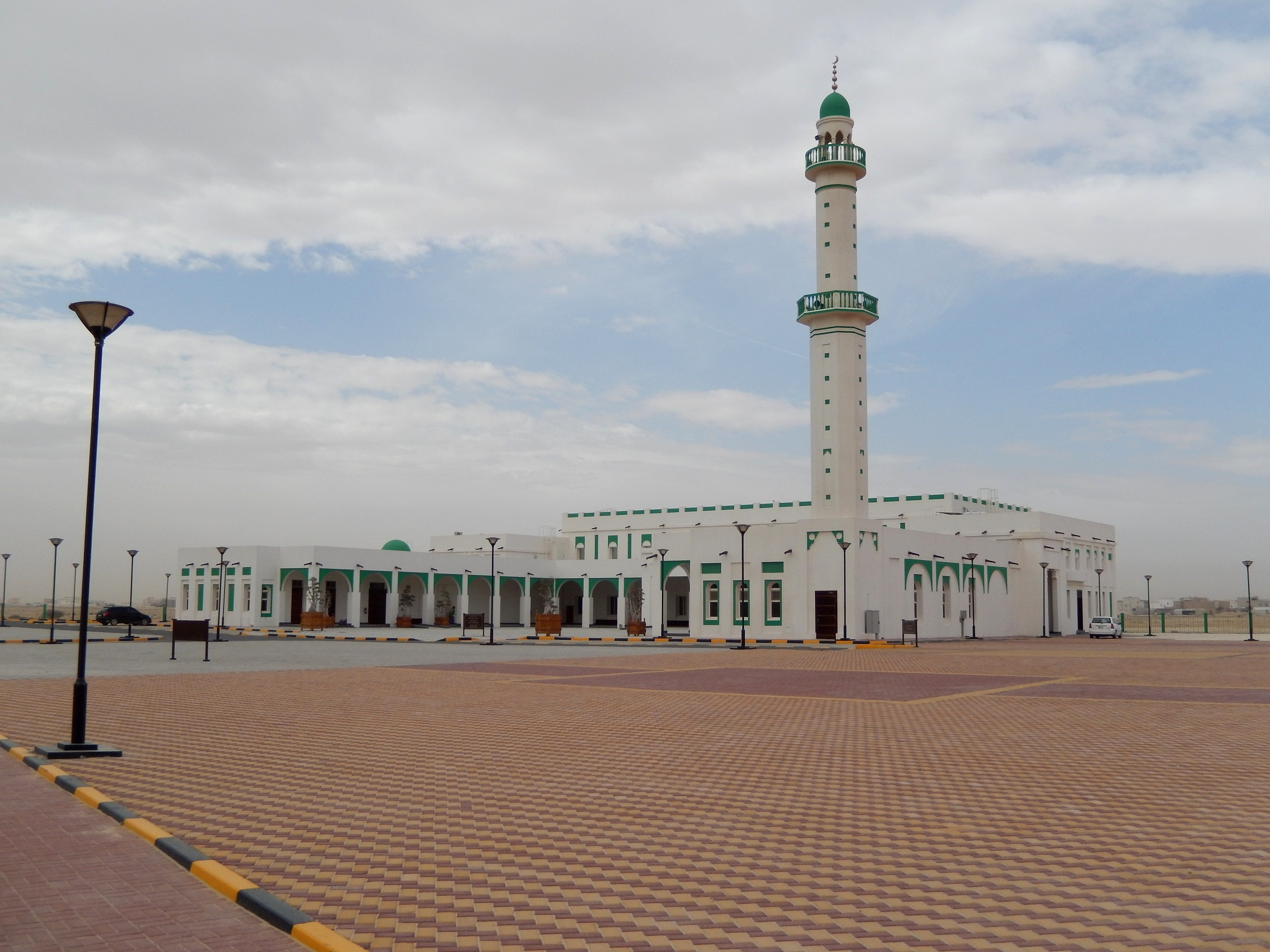
A large mosque in Umm Qarn

Umm Qarn (Arabic: أم قرن) is a Qatari village in the municipality of Al Daayen. Located just off Al Shamal Highway, the village hosts the municipal office and currently serves as the municipality's administrative seat.

== Etymology ==
The settlement derives its name from local geographical features. Umm Qarn translates to "mother of flat shaped hill".

== History ==
Local tradition states that Umm Qarn is the ancestral homeland of the Al Mudahika tribe. The Al Fadala family, descended from the ancient Arab Tayy tribe, also historically resided here.

In July 1985, the Qatari government announced it had begun a campaign to distribute fresh water to rural villages suffering from water shortages. As part of this campaign, QAR 25,000 was allocated towards water distribution in Umm Qarn.

== Geography ==
Umm Qarn is situated in eastern Qatar, about 35 km from the capital Doha. It is located in the northern part of the Al Daayen Municipality. The villages of Abu Thaylah and Simaisma are nearby.

It forms the southernmost boundary of the southern sector of Qatar's interior plain region. The area around Umm Qarn, as part of this southern sector, is characterized by small hills and valleys. Rawdas (depressions) are also a common feature. Elevations in the area range from 3 metres (9.8 ft) to 45 metres (148 ft).

== Landmarks ==
An 235-hectare stud farm, Umm Qarn Stud Farm, is located in the village. It is a luxury stable which houses dozens of champion horses and "the breeding ground of some of the most successful – and expensive – race horses on the planet". Most food requirements are imported from abroad except during winter when grass seed originating from the US is planted.

== Developments ==
The Qatar National Master Plan (QNMP) is described as a "spatial representation of the Qatar National Vision 2030". As part of the QNMP's Urban Centre plan, which aims to implement development strategies in 28 central hubs that will serve their surrounding communities, Umm Qarn has been designated a Town Centre, which is the third-highest designation.

Al Daayen Municipality is developing Umm Qarn as a retail and administrative center for the municipality's northern settlements, such as Simaisma. Currently, the village already has a municipal office, the municipality's only primary healthcare center, a civil defense center, a police station and two primary schools. Officials have discussed the future possibility of constructing a metro station in the village. About four-fifths of the village's overall area stands vacant. New projects have been taking place to the north-east of the current village nucleus, particularly a public school and a new governments services complex. Municipal officials are planning to create new office and retail spaces near the government services complex. The government services complex will be 74,744 m^{2} and contain emergency and police services, a mosque and a primary health care centre. A 41,267 m^{2} social centre is also in the works.

== Agriculture ==
The Arab Qatari Company for Poultry Production was founded in 1984 with its main poultry farm in Umm Qarn. In 1985, the year after its establishment, the government announced it would be implementing a project to increase the production of meat chickens to 4 million and eggs to 45 million on annual basis.

Annually, over 300,000 seedlings are grown in Umm Qarn's nursery. Most of these seedlings are distributed to Qatar's various government ministries. The nursery covers an area of about 20 hectares and has 7 growing areas. A tree nursery in nearby Rawdat Bakheela in Al Khor Municipality was rehabilitated in 2008, and is used by the government for research and tree production.

== Education ==
The following schools are located in Umm Qarn:

Name of School	Curriculum	Grade	Genders	Ref
Az Zaanen Primary and Secondary School	Independent	Primary/Secondary	Female-only	
Sumaismah Primary School	Independent	Primary	Male-only	
