= Al Ebb =

Al Ebb العب
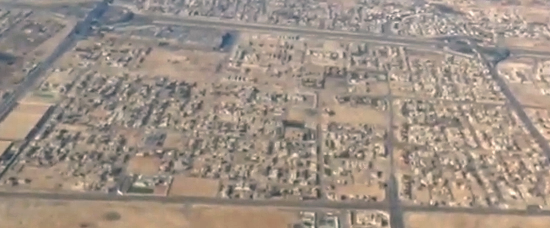
- Aerial view of Al Ebb

- Location within Qatar
- Coordinates: 25.395165°N 51.447079°E
- Country: Qatar
- Municipality: Al Daayen
- Zone: Zone 70
- District no.: 116

Area
  - Total: 7.0 km^{2} (2.7 sq mi)
- Elevation: 14 m (46 ft)

Al Ebb (Arabic: العب) is a settlement in the municipality of Al Daayen in Qatar. It is located in the southern portion of the municipality, and is being developed as a residential hub.

== Etymology ==
Al Ebb derived its name from the Arabic term abba which roughly translates to "maximum capacity". It received its name due to its defining feature being a large depression, hosting various types of plants, which would be filled with water during the rainy months.
