= John Gordon Lorimer (civil servant) =

Scottish civil administrator

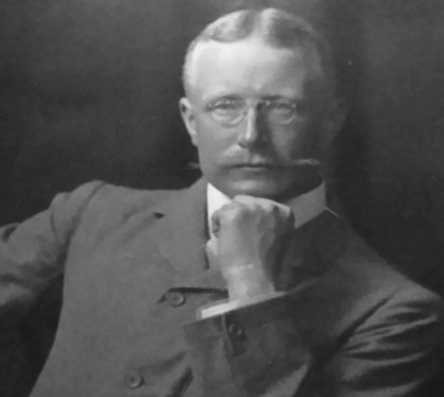
- Photograph of J. G. Lorimer
- Born: 1870; Glasgow, Scotland
- Died: 8 February 1914 (aged 43–44); Bushire, Persia
- Occupations: Diplomat, historian
- Notable work: Gazetteer of the Persian Gulf, Oman and Central Arabia

John Gordon Lorimer CIE (14 June 1870 – 8 February 1914), also known as J. G. Lorimer, was a British diplomat, historian and colonial administrator. Working for the British Raj in Punjab and the Northwest frontier province, he later served in the Persian Gulf region as British Political Resident. He is most famous for his encyclopedia, the Gazetteer of the Persian Gulf, Oman and Central Arabia.

== Biography ==
=== Early life and career ===
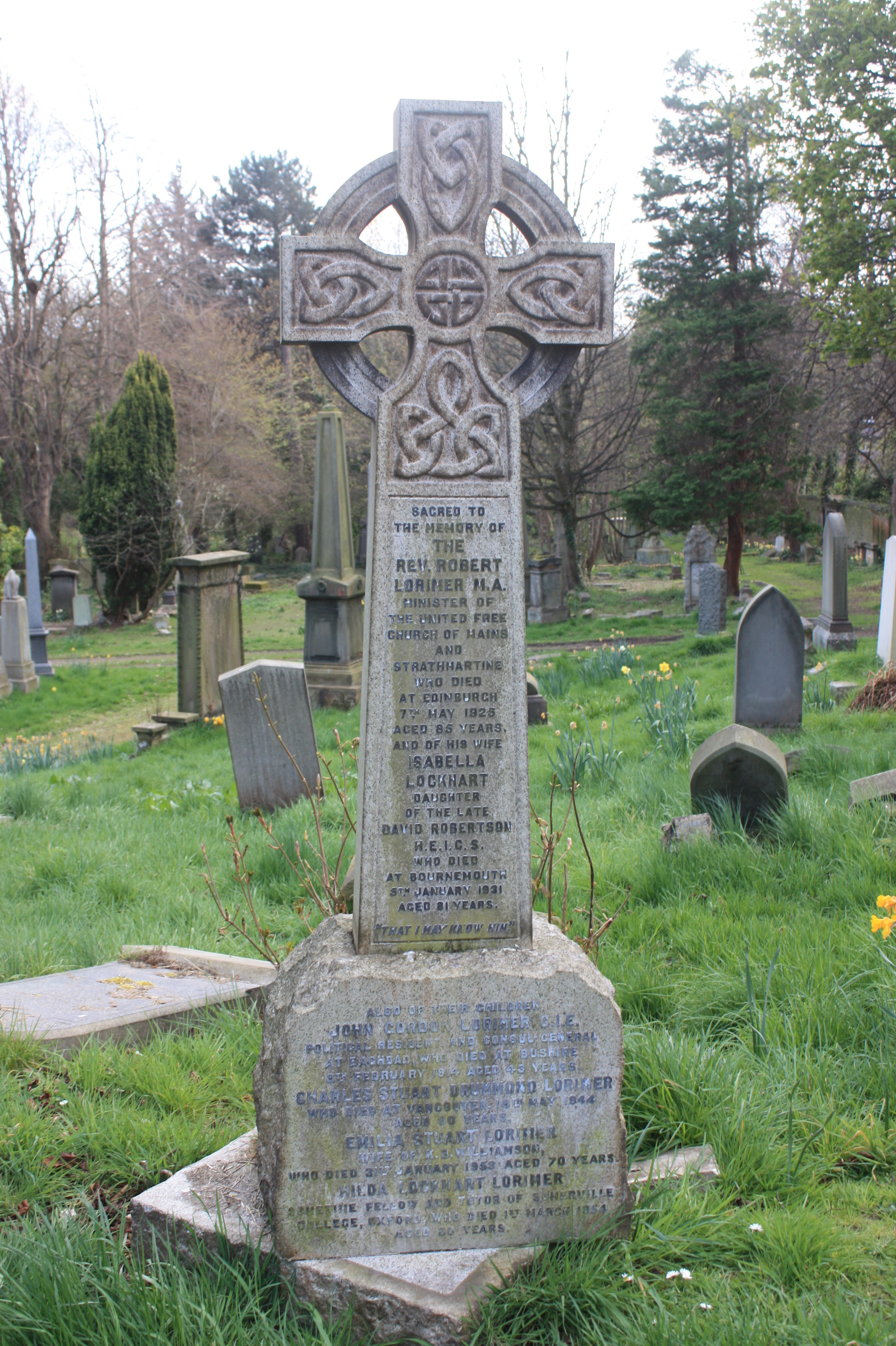
The Lorimer grave, Warriston Cemetery

John Gordon Lorimer was born in Glasgow in 1870, a son of the Reverend Robert Lorimer (1840–1926) a Free Church minister, and his wife Isabella Robertson.

The Lorimer family was intimately associated with colonial service; his maternal uncle (who served as a judge) was killed during the Indian mutiny of 1857. His younger brother David Lockhart Robertson Lorimer served as British vice-consul in Arabistan. His other brother Robert worked in the Indian civil service until he was dismissed for refusing to participate in a flogging. His younger brother William Lorimer and younger sister Hilda Lockhart Lorimer were scholars.

Educated at the High School of Dundee, and the University of Edinburgh, Lorimer trained at Christ Church, Oxford for the Indian Civil Service. He was stationed first in Punjab and later in the restive Northwest frontier province. Passionate about languages, he authored a book on the grammar of Waziri Pashto in 1902. In 1903, he was commissioned by the British Raj to compile a handbook for British diplomats and agents in the Persian Gulf region. Initially given only six months, he insisted on being granted more time to ensure the handbook was thorough. The result was the 5,000 page two-volume Gazetteer of the Persian Gulf, Oman and Central Arabia. Its geography portion was only completed in 1908 and the history portion was finished & published in 1915, a year after Lorimer's death. Due to the secrecy of the document, it was not acknowledged in his obituaries and public knowledge of the document only became apparent when the document was declassified in 1955.

=== Death ===
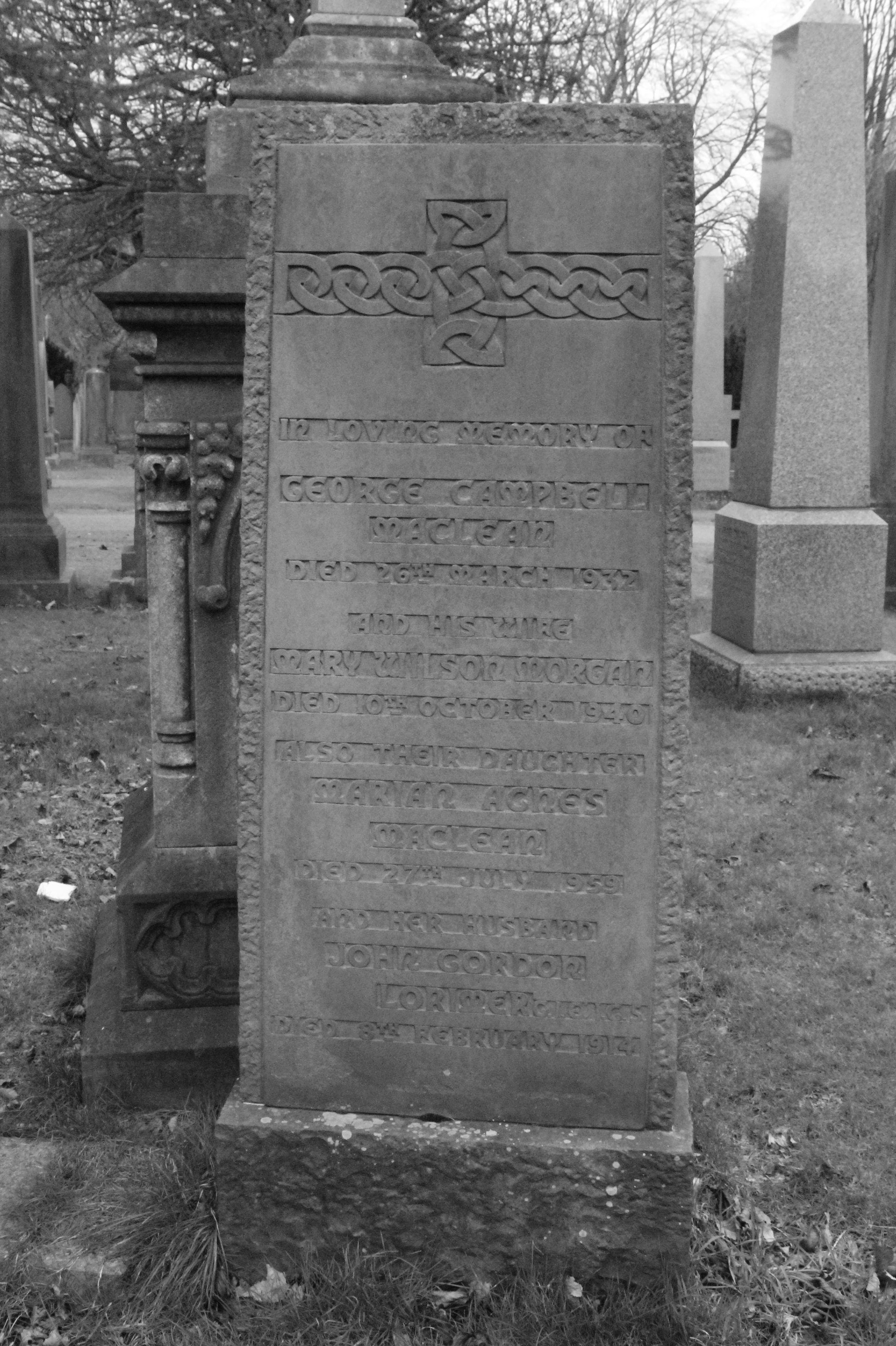
Memorial to John Gordon Lorimer and his wife, Dean Cemetery

On the 8 February 1914, while serving as the British Political Resident in Bushire, Lorimer was found dead from a self-inflicted gun wound in the abdomen at age 43. A contemporary report stated that he was examining his pistol after supposedly emptying the magazine when he apparently overlooked a bullet present. The gunshot pierced major blood vessels, resulting in the loss of consciousness and death. His funeral took place the next day and he was buried at the Indo-European Telegraph Department cemetery. He was survived by his wife Marian Agnes MacLean (d. 1959). He is memorialised with his siblings in Warriston Cemetery in Edinburgh and on his wife's grave in Dean Cemetery.

His death was mourned in the Persian Gulf region, particularly in Bahrain where the British Agency was closed as a sign of respect on the following day. Bahraini noblemen, merchants, and foreigners alike made their way at the Agency to offer their condolences. In an offer of commiseration, the ruler of Bahrain, Isa bin Ali Al Khalifa, ordered the flags at his residence and at the customs house lowered, while his son Abdullah traveled to the Agency to pay his respects.

== Bibliography ==
- Customary Law of the Main Tribes in the Peshawar District (1899)
- Grammar and Vocabulary of Waziri Pashto (1902)
- Gazetteer of the Persian Gulf, Oman and Central Arabia (1908, 1915)
