= Gazetteer of the Persian Gulf, Oman and Central Arabia =

Encyclopedia first published in 1908

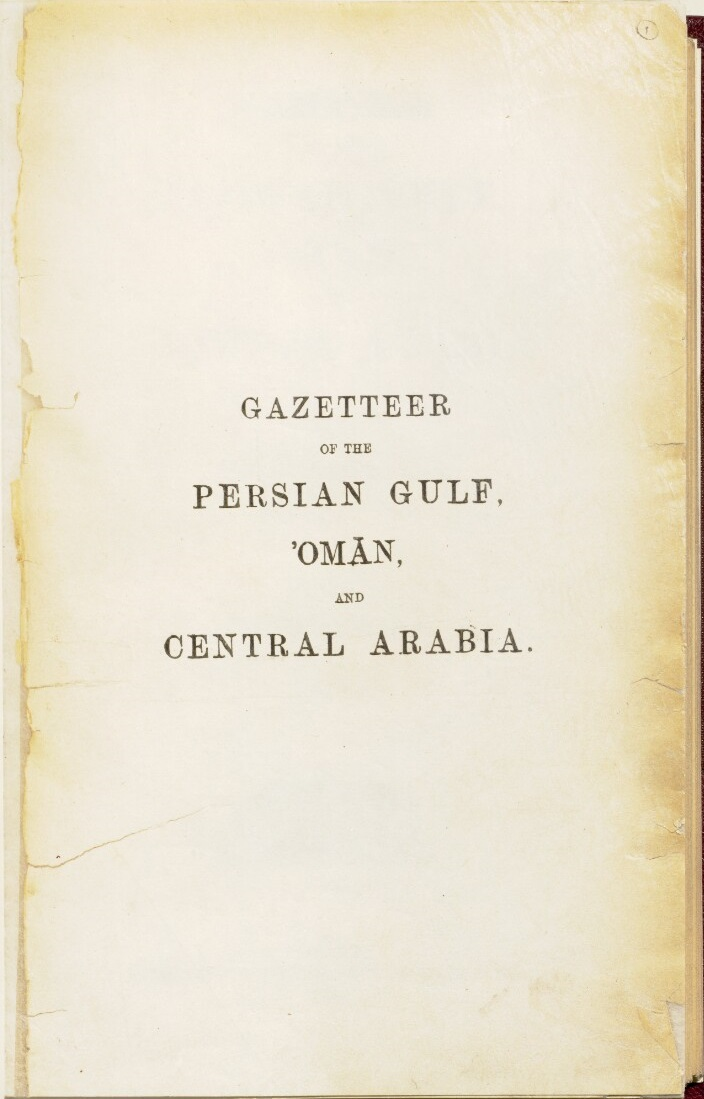
- The cover page of the gazetteer
- Author: John Gordon Lorimer
- Language: English
- Published: 1908, 1915
- Pages: 5000

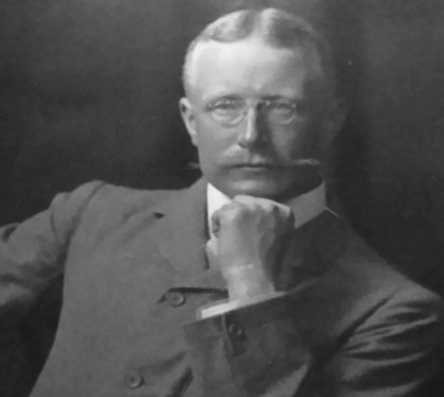
John Gordon Lorimer

The Gazetteer of the Persian Gulf, Oman and Central Arabia (nicknamed Lorimer) is a two-volume encyclopedia compiled by John Gordon Lorimer. The Gazetteer was published in secret by the British government in India in 1908 and 1915 and it served as a handbook for British diplomats in the Arabian Peninsula and Persia.

The work was declassified in 1955 under the fifty-year rule, and was widely praised for its extensive coverage of the region's history and geography. It is considered to be "the most important single source of historical material on the Gulf States and Saudi Arabia" from the 17th to early 20th century.

== Background ==
Beginning in the 20th century, the British Empire sought to strengthen its connections to British-controlled India which in turn resulted in a greater interest in the Persian Gulf region, culminating in the visit of the Viceroy of India Lord Curzon to the Gulf in 1903. To ensure that British agents in the region were adequately informed and prepared to strengthen their influence in the region, a light-weight and easily accessible handbook was needed.

In November 1903, the British authorities commissioned John Gordon Lorimer, a member of the Indian Civil Service serving in the North-West Frontier Province, to compile such a document. Lorimer was initially given six months to accomplish the task, but repeatedly insisted on being granted more time to ensure the work was completed thoroughly. Placed under special duty and with a team of researchers, over the next 10 years data was collated from government archives in Calcutta and Bombay, and from multiple field expeditions to the Gulf.

== Contents ==
The gazetteer is a 5000-page document divided into two volumes; the first details the region's history and the second details its geography. The geography portion of the gazetteer was completed first and was published in 1908. The history portion of the gazetteer was only completed and published in 1915, one year after Lorimer himself died in a shooting accident.

=== History ===
The "Historical" volume is divided into three parts. Part 1 is dedicated to the general history of the Persian Gulf, central Arabia and Ottoman Iraq. Part 2 starts with particular reference to Arabistan, followed by Makran and the Persian costs and islands. It also includes 19 appendices on various subjects. Part 3 consists of 21 genealogical charts pertaining to the ruling families of the region.

The research was compiled from Lorimer's own notes and the work of colleagues such as J.A. Saldanha and C.H. Gabriel and ranged from the 17th to the 20th centuries.

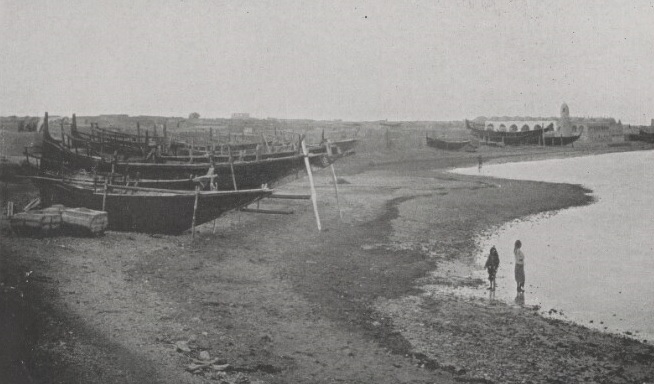
Doha in 1904, from the gazetteer.

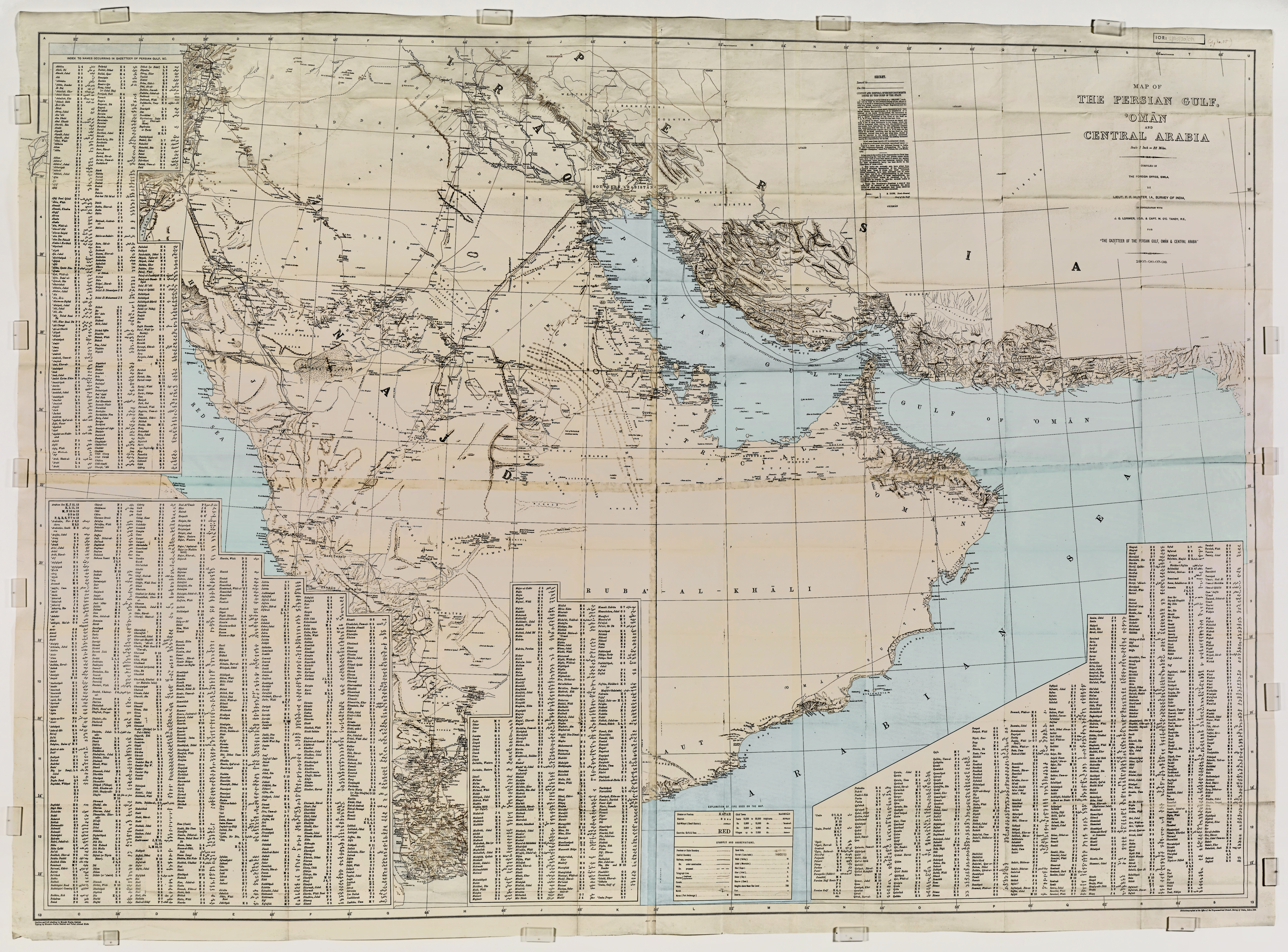
Map of the Persian Gulf, from the gazetteer.

=== Geography ===
Titled the "Geographical and Statistical" section, this is a 2000-page document and lists an extensive alphabetical arrangement of tribes and settlements across the region, divided into different countries. The data was obtained through research missions carried out by Lorimer and his group. Also in the volume are 56 reproduced images of the region taken from colonial records and two maps showing the distribution of pearling sites and the overall political geography.

== Reception and legacy ==
Classified for official use only, the gazetteer was published in secrecy in 1908 and 1915 respectively with only dozens of copies in circulation. As such, there was no public awareness of the existence of the work. Consequently, Lorimer's obituary makes no mention of the gazetteer. He was credited as the author only when the work was declassified in 1955.

In 1971, The Times Literary Supplement praised the historical coverage of the work as "stupendous" and its geographical section as "without modern substitute". The gazetteer, although drawn from British sources and written from a British perspective, is still regarded as a valuable resource for the serious researcher.

The gazetteer was digitised and made available online by the Qatar Digital Library in January 2015.
