= Umm Ebairiya =

Umm Ebairiya أم عبيرية
- Village
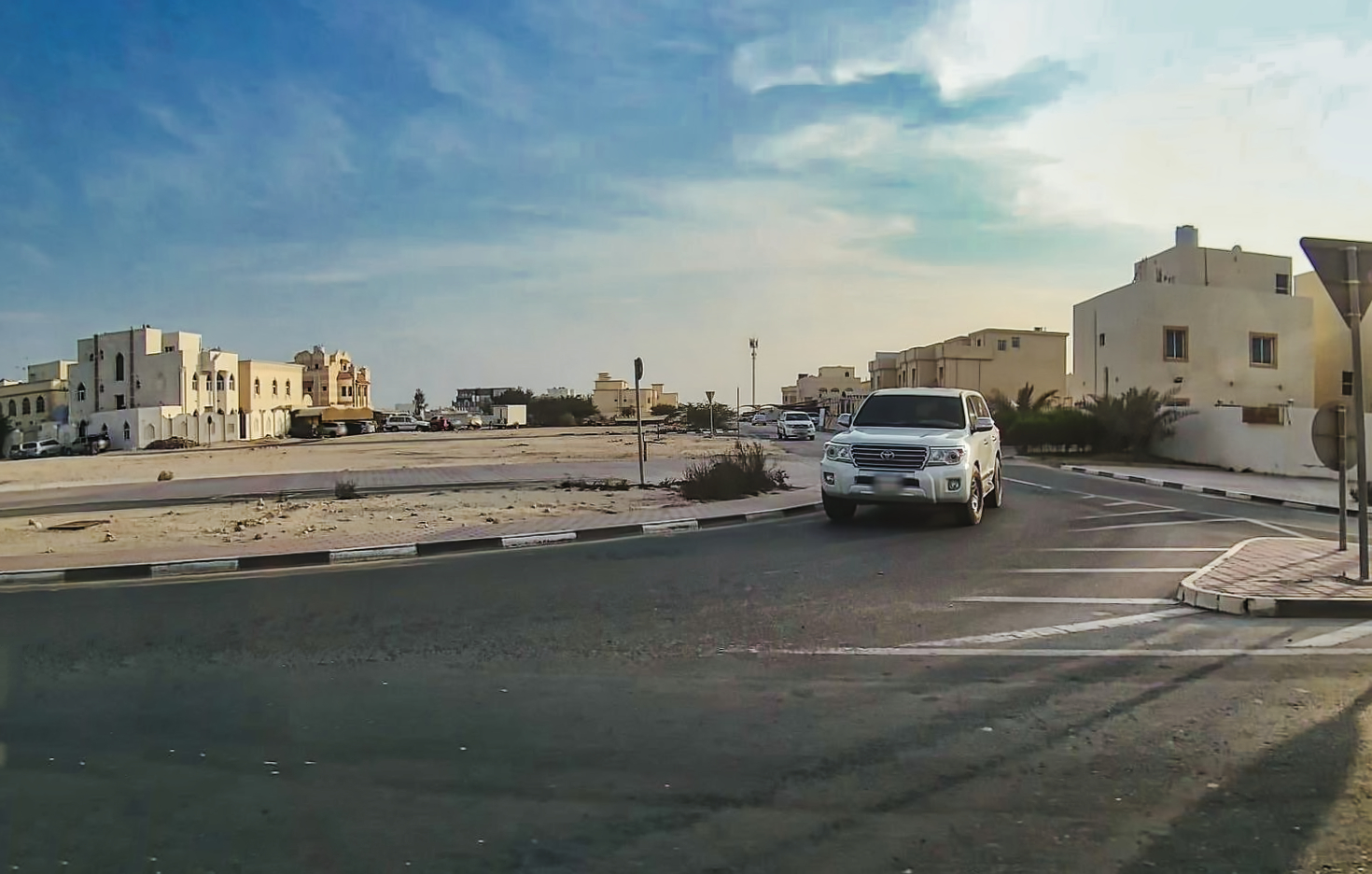
- 188 Street in Umm Ebairiya

- Location within Qatar
- Coordinates: 25°29′00″N 51°23′00″E
- Country: Qatar
- Municipality: Umm Salal
- Zone: Zone 71
- District no.: 131

Area
  - Total: 7.1 km^{2} (2.7 sq mi)

Umm Ebairiya (Arabic: أم عبيرية, romanized: Umm ‘Ābirīyah) is a Qatari village in the municipality of Umm Salal.

In the 2015 census, it was listed as a district of Zone 71, which has a population of 90,835 and also includes all of Umm Salal's other administrative districts.

It borders Umm Al Amad to the east, Umm Salal Ali to the southeast and Saina Al-Humaidi to the northeast.

== Etymology ==
Umm means "mother" in Arabic and is commonly used as a prefix for geographical features. The second component, ebairiya, comes from obri, the local name of a type of Sidr tree that grows abundantly in the region.

Alternative transliterations of the name include Umm ‘Ubayrīyah, Umm Obairiya, Umm A'birieh and Umm Abiriyah.
