= Umm Salal Ali =

Umm Salal Ali أم صلال علي
- Town
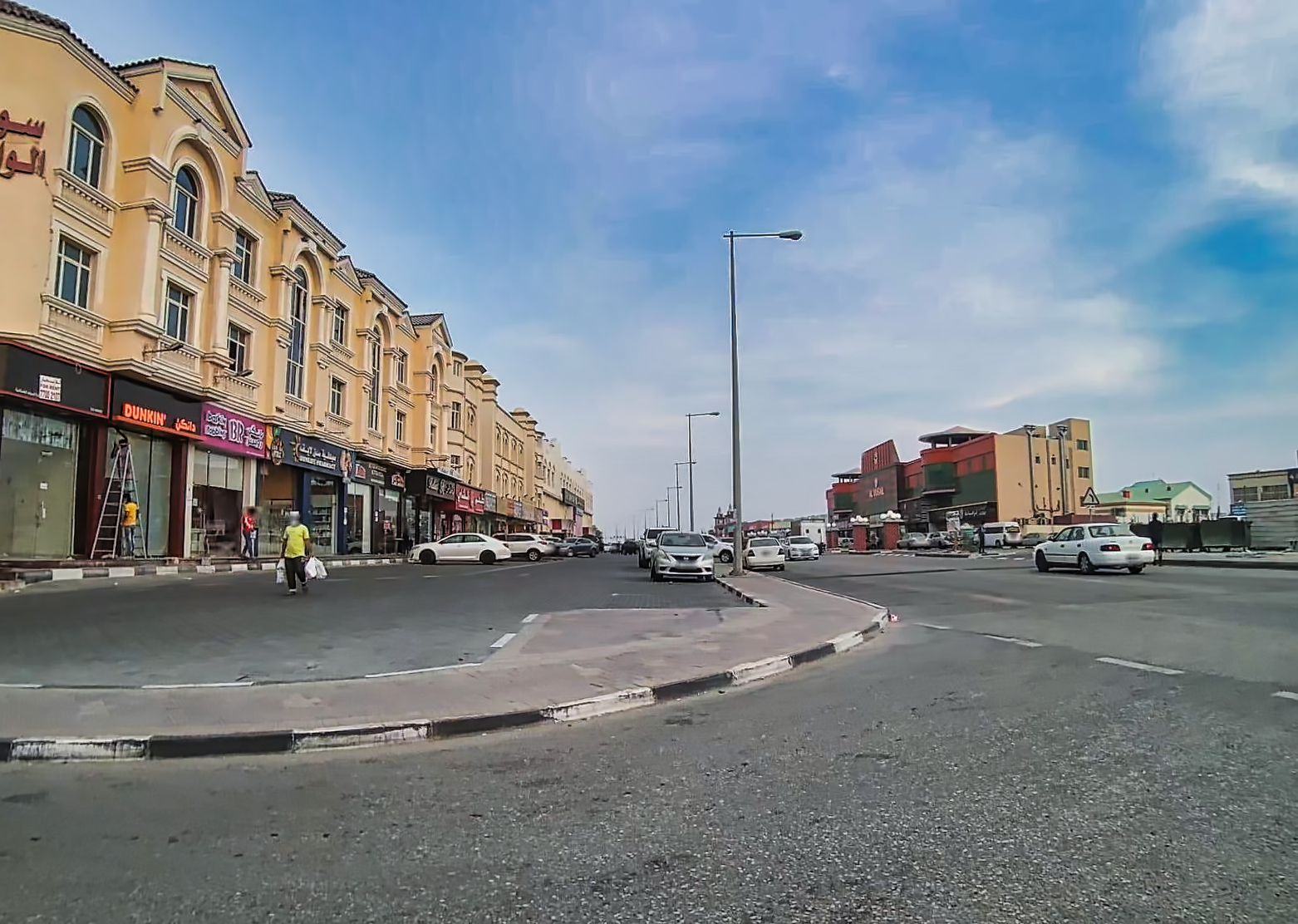
- Shops along Umm Salal Ali Road in Umm Salal Ali

- Location within Qatar
- Coordinates: 25°28′11″N 51°23′51″E
- Country: Qatar
- Municipality: Umm Salal
- Zone: Zone 71
- District no.: 130

Area
  - Total: 11.1 km^{2} (4.3 sq mi)

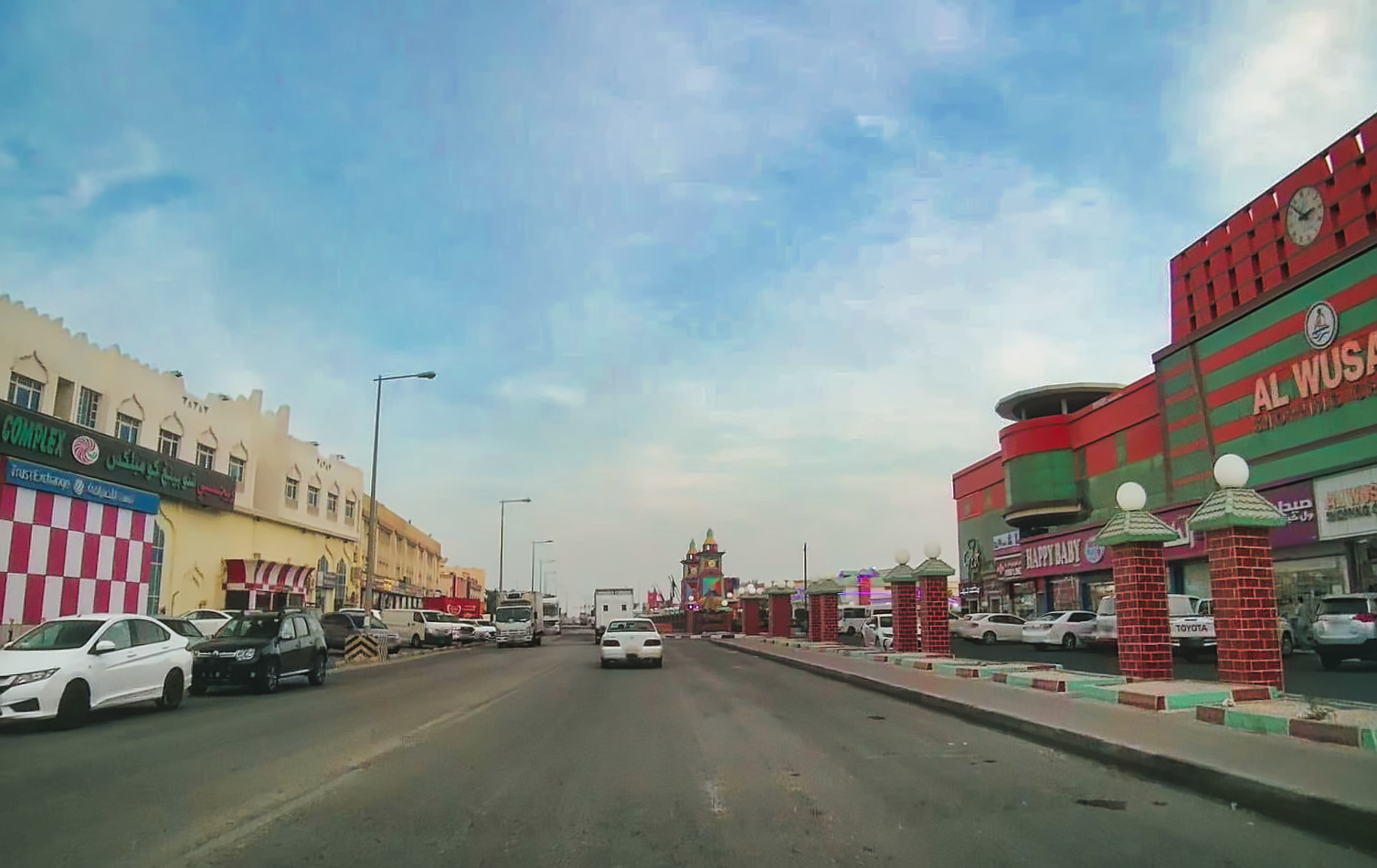
Al Wusail Shopping Complex on Umm Salal Ali Road in Umm Salal Ali

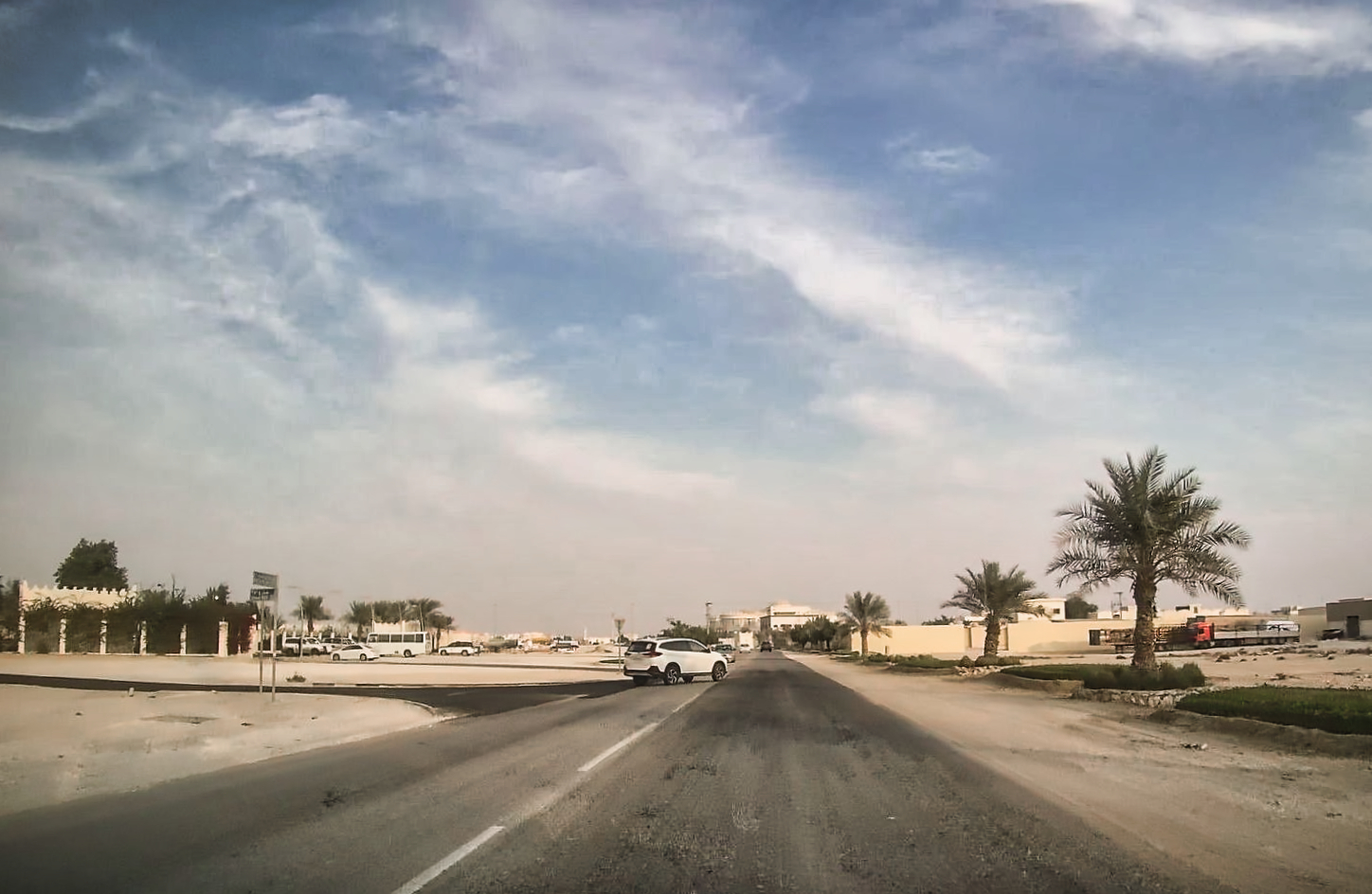
Intersection of Ali Bin Jassim Street and 350 Street in Umm Salal Ali

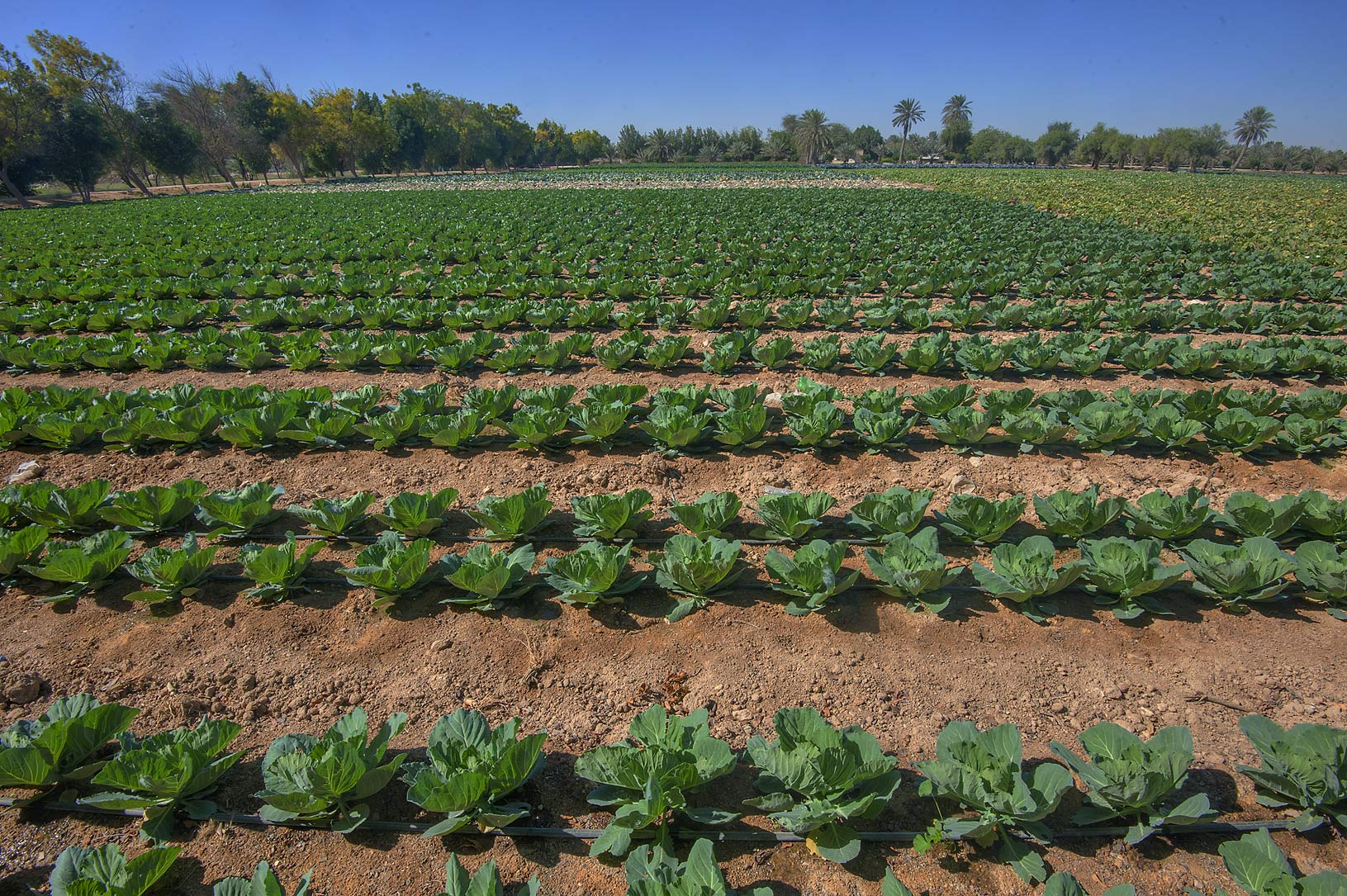
Cabbage field in Al Sulaiteen Complex, Umm Salal Ali

Umm Salal Ali (Arabic: أم صلال علي, romanized: Umm Ṣalāl ‘Alī) is the seat of the municipality of Umm Salal in Qatar.

== Etymology ==
In Arabic, umm salal roughly translates to "mother of rocks". The name "Ali" added onto the end refers to Ali bin Jassim Al Thani, a son of Qatar's former ruler, Jassim bin Mohammed Al Thani. After the death of his father in 1913, Ali bin Jassim Al Thani lived in nearby Al Sakhama and Al Daayen, before moving to Umm Salal Ali in 1931. Previously, he had dug a well here in 1928 while en route to Mecca for the Hajj, and had spent some of his winters here.

== Geography ==
Umm Salal Ali lies in eastern Qatar. Nearby villages include Umm Al Amad, Bu Fasseela and Al Mazrouah. The village is located 27 km from the capital Doha, 7 km from Umm Salal Mohammed, 20 km from Al Khor, 51 km from Madinat ash Shamal, and 26 km from Al Wakrah.

== Central Municipal Council ==
When free elections of the Central Municipal Council first took place in Qatar during 1999, Umm Salal Ali was designated the seat of constituency no. 22. It would remain constituency seat in the next three elections until being transferred to constituency No. 19 and being replaced as constituency seat by Umm Salal Mohammed in the fifth municipal elections in 2015. In the inaugural municipal elections in 1999, Mohammed Khalaf Al Kaabi won the elections, receiving 38.7%, or 104 votes. Runner-up candidate was Ahmed Ibrahim Al Shaib, receiving 27.9%, or 75 votes. Overall, voter turnout that year was 86.5%. The 1999 runner-up Ahmed Ibrahim Al Shaib ended up winning in the 2002 elections. In the third municipal elections in 2007, Mohammed Khamis Al Ali was elected constituency representative. However, Ahmed Ibrahim Al Shaib reclaimed his seat in the 2011 elections.

== Development ==
In 2015, the government included Umm Salal Ali in its $4.6 bn project to construct reservoirs in five sites across the country. Once completed, the reservoirs are expected to be the largest in the world in their category, with a total length of 650 km and constructed at a cost of QR 14.5 billion. In June 2018, the first phase of the project was completed.

== Landmarks ==
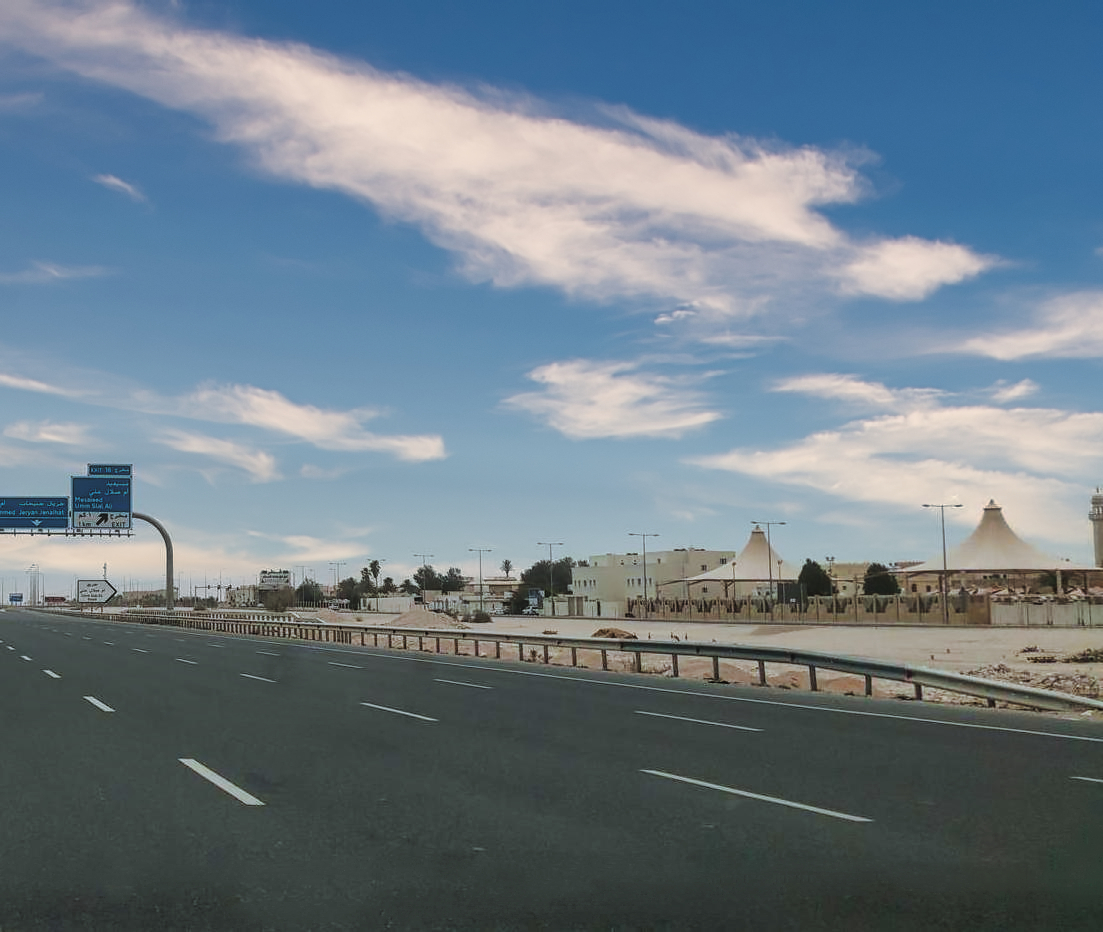
Turn off to Umm Salal Ali Road from Al Shamal Road

=== Barzan Girls Center ===
The town hosts the Brazan Girls Center. Established in 2008, the center engages in various activities for young girls such as sewing classes, seminars, and theater.

=== Central Fish Market ===
In mid-2017, the Central Fish Market was transferred from Abu Hamour to Umm Salal Ali. The new fish market is situated in the south of the village next to Al Mazrouah Yard, and can accommodate up to 50 stalls.

== Infrastructure ==
=== Al Sulaiteen Agricultural Complex ===
Al Sulaiteen Agricultural Complex is headquartered in Umm Salal Ali. Consisting of 40 hectares of cultivable land owned by Abdullah Salem al-Sulaiteen, up to 300 tonnes of fresh produce is shipped from the farm annually. Desalination plants are also located onsite. Preparatory surveys and geological mapping for the farm were first carried out in March 1995, and its designs were finalized in December 1996.

=== Government complex ===
There is a government complex in the heart of the town which has an Insects and Rodent Control Department office, a Public Gardens Department office and a Food Control Department office. To the south-east of these offices is the municipal headquarters.

=== Sewage plant ===
As of its official opening in 2016, the town hosts the main sewage treatment plant for the QR 3.63 billion North Doha Sewage Treatment Works. It had a planned capacity to treat 245,000 cubic meters of sewage daily at the time of its establishment.

== Healthcare ==
The first primary healthcare facility to operate within the municipality was located in Umm Salal Ali. The health centre was opened in 1985 to serve the entire region.

== Sports ==
Umm Salal SC, which fields a top-tier football team, is based in Umm Salal Ali. The Umm Salal Stadium, built in 1996, covers 34,500 m^{2} and features two football pitches, locker rooms and an administrative office. However, the club uses Thani bin Jassim Stadium as its homegrounds for most games due to its larger capacity.

Barzan Olympic Park was established by the Qatar Olympic Committee in the town in 2012. It accommodates a motor racing circuit, two football fields, two tennis courts and a basketball court. There is also a public swimming pool and cycling path in the park.

== Education ==
There are two Quran learning centers in the town: Dar Jassim Bin Ahmed Ali Al-Thani Quran Learning for men and Dar Jassim Bin Ahmed Ali Al-Thani Quran Learning for women.

The following schools are located in Umm Salal Ali:

Name of School	Curriculum	Grade	Genders	Official Website	Ref
Umm Salal Ali Primary Boys School	Independent	Kindergarten – Primary	Male-only	N/A	
Olive International School – Umm Salal Ali campus	Indian	Kindergarten – Primary	Both	Official website	
