= Umm Salal Stadium =

Proposed Qatari football stadium

Coordinates: 25.4200°N 51.4000°E

- Artist's impression of the new stadium
- Interactive map of Umm Salal Stadium
- Location: Umm Salal Mohammed, Umm Salal, Qatar
- Owner: Qatar Football Association
- Capacity: 45,000
- Surface: Grass

Construction
- Architect: Albert Speer & Partner GmbH

Tenants
- Umm Salal SC; 2022 FIFA World Cup

The Umm Salal Stadium (Arabic: ملعب أم صلال) was a proposed football stadium that would have been built in the town of Umm Salal Mohammed in Umm Salal, Qatar. It was designed by Albert Speer & Partner GmbH.

It was one of the five proposed World Cup stadiums which were never built by Qatar. A major factor in its cancellation was its distance from the Doha Metro and from other accommodation and sporting venues in Doha.

== Plans ==
Umm Salal Stadium was planned to support 45,120 fans. The conceptual design of the stadium was based on traditional Arabian forts. Post World Cup, the stadium would have decreased its capacity to 25,500 seats and would have been used by Umm Salal F.C. as their home ground.
