= Al Mazrouah =

Al Mazrouah اَلْمَزْرُوعَة
- Al Mazrouah Yard
- Coordinates: 25.43585°N 51.3810825°E
- Country: Qatar
- Municipality: Umm Salal
- Zone: Zone 71
- District no.: 145

Area
  - Total: 5.9 km^{2} (2.3 sq mi)

Al Mazrouah (Arabic: اَلْمَزْرُوعَة, romanized: Al Mazrū‘ah) is a village in the municipality of Umm Salal in Qatar. It is located south of the town of Umm Salal Ali and west of Bu Fasseela, another village in the same municipality.

== Etymology ==
The word mazrouah is Arabic for "the cultivated". Being located next to a large rawda (depression), rainwater would gather here, and as a result various shrubs and trees grew here, hence giving the impression that it is cultivated. In the past, inhabitants constructed wells in the village from whence they obtained drinking water and a source of irrigation for their crops. Nearby villages would also obtain water from these wells.

== History ==
J.G. Lorimer mentioned Al Mazrouah in 1908 in his Gazetteer of the Persian Gulf, stating that it lies "14 miles north-west of Dohah and 10 from the east coast". He also noted that "there is a masonry well, 7 fathoms deep, which yields good water. There are trees, but cultivation is wanting, notwithstanding the name".

== Infrastructure ==
Al Mazrouah Yard hosts a farmers' market where consumers can purchase fresh produce. Niche products such as hydroponically grown fruits and vegetables are sold here. It is one of the three farmers' markets in Qatar as of 2014. Next to Al Mazrouah Yard is the Umm Salal Ali Central Fish Market.

The Ministry of Municipality and Environment has announced construction of a massive 270,000 square meter agricultural research complex in the village. One of the focuses of the complex will be developing new methods for hydroponic crop production. Officials provided a completion date of 2021 for phase one of the project.

The Scout and Guide Association of Qatar has a camp set up over a 400,000 square meter area in the district. Located just off Al Shamal Road, it was constructed at a cost of QR 86 million and is one of the largest facilities of its kind in the world.
