= Jeri Al Samir =

Jeri Al Samir جري السمر
- Location within Qatar
- Coordinates: 25.41795°N 51.36215°E
- Country: Qatar
- Municipality: Umm Salal
- Zone: Zone 71
- District no.: 147

Area
  - Total: 10.8 km^{2} (4.2 sq mi)

Jeri Al Samir (Arabic: جري السمر, romanized: Jarī as Sāmir; also spelled Jeri Al Sammar and Jeri Al Samur) is a village in the municipality of Umm Salal in Qatar. It is located in the central-southern part of the municipality near the border with Al Rayyan Municipality.

== Etymology ==
Jeri originates from the Arabic word qeri, which refers to an area where water aggregates and facilitates the growth of various vegetation. The second part of the village's name, Samir, is the name of a prominent man who used to reside there.

== Infrastructure ==
In 2015, the Ministry of Economy and Trade announced that it would be commencing the development of a logistics center in the village at a cost of QR 331 million. The area was selected because of its strategic location near the Orbital Highway and because of relatively lower operation costs. Once fully completed, the logistics center will host facilities for 21 companies in the fields of auto parts and machinery, food and beverages, warehousing and storage, and construction.
