= Abu Thaylah =

Abu Thaylah أَبُو ثَيْلَة
- District
- Location in Qatar
- Coordinates: 25°31′55″N 51°18′16″E
- Country: Qatar
- Municipality: Umm Salal
- Zone: Zone 71
- District no.: 139

Area
  - Total: 7.7 sq mi (20.0 km^{2})

Abu Thaylah (Arabic: أَبُو ثَيْلَة) is a district in Qatar, located in the municipality of Umm Salal.

== Etymology ==
Abu means father in Arabic, and in this context is used as a prefix to signify a geographic feature. The second part, thayla, is derived from a plant known locally as al thail which is found in great abundance around the area.

== Geography ==
Abu Thaylah forms the southernmost boundary of the southern sector of Qatar's interior plain region. The area around Abu Thaylah, as part of this southern sector, is characterized by small hills and valleys. Rawdas (depressions) are also a common feature. Elevations in the area range from 3 metres (9.8 ft) to 45 metres (148 ft).

== Infrastructure ==
In the late 1960s the government established an electrical substation here.

A large-scale government-sanctioned plant nursery was opened in Abu Thaylah in 2003. Plants grown in the nursery are used for research and also distributed to government ministries. The nursery covers an area of 2,500 sq meters.
