= Umm Salal =

Municipality in Qatar

Umm Salal أم صلال (Arabic)
- Municipality
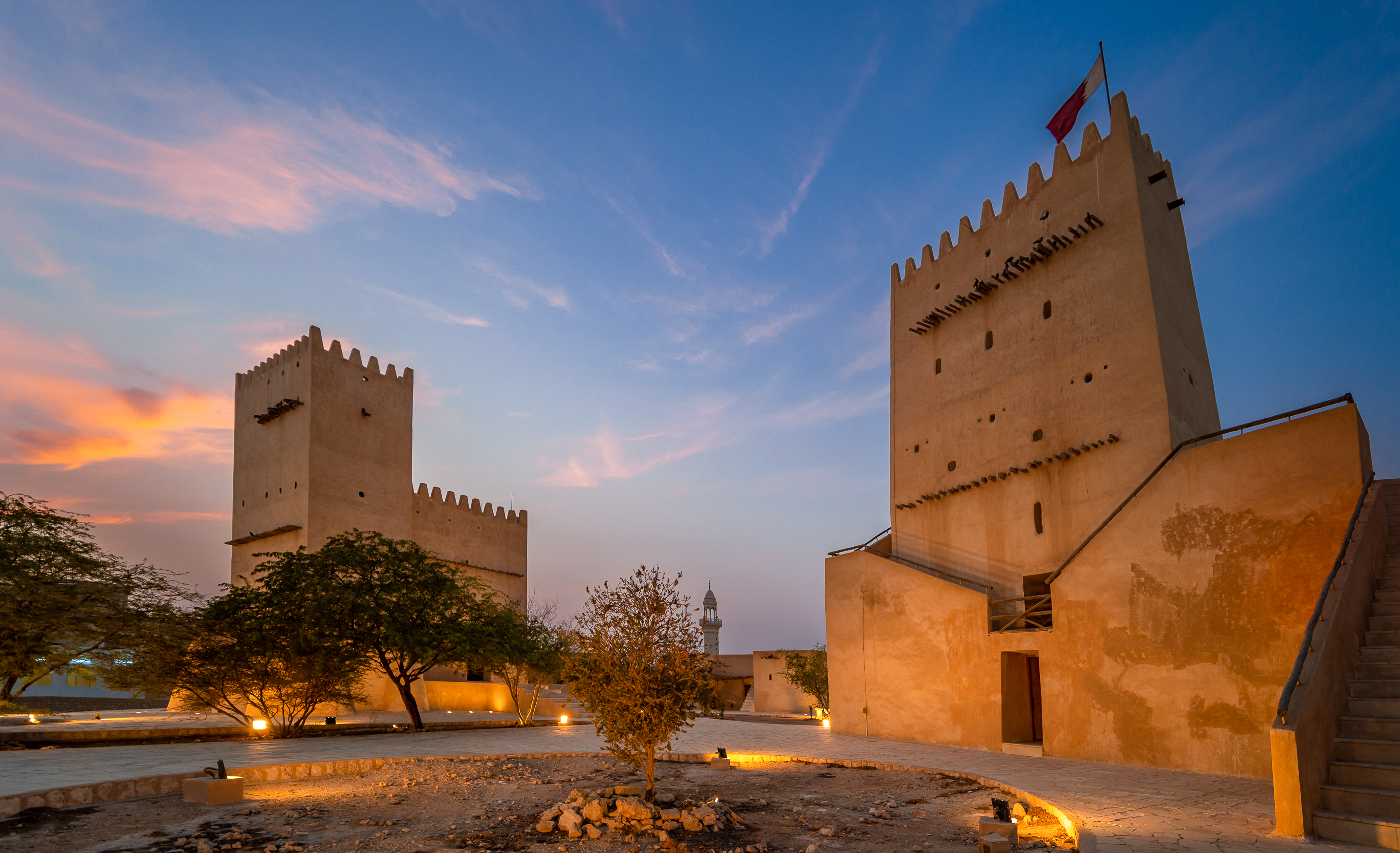
- The iconic Barzan Towers found in Umm Salal Mohammed

- Map of Qatar with Umm Salal highlighted
- Coordinates (Umm Salal Ali): 25°28′11″N 51°23′51″E
- Country: Qatar
- Capital: Umm Salal Ali
- Zones: 1

Government
  - Mayor: Rashid Ahmed Al-Kaabi

Area
  - Total: 318.4 km^{2} (122.9 sq mi)

Population (2015)
  - Total: 90,835
  - Density: 285.3/km^{2} (738.9/sq mi)
- Time zone: UTC+03 (East Africa Time)
- ISO 3166 code: QA-US

Umm Salal (Arabic: أم صلال, romanized: Umm Ṣalāl, lit. 'mother of rocks'; also spelled Umm Slal) is a municipality in the State of Qatar.

Historic landmarks such as the Barzan Tower are located in Umm Salal.The municipal headquarters is located in Umm Salal Ali, about 10 km from the coast and 15 km north of Doha, the Qatari capital.

== Etymology ==
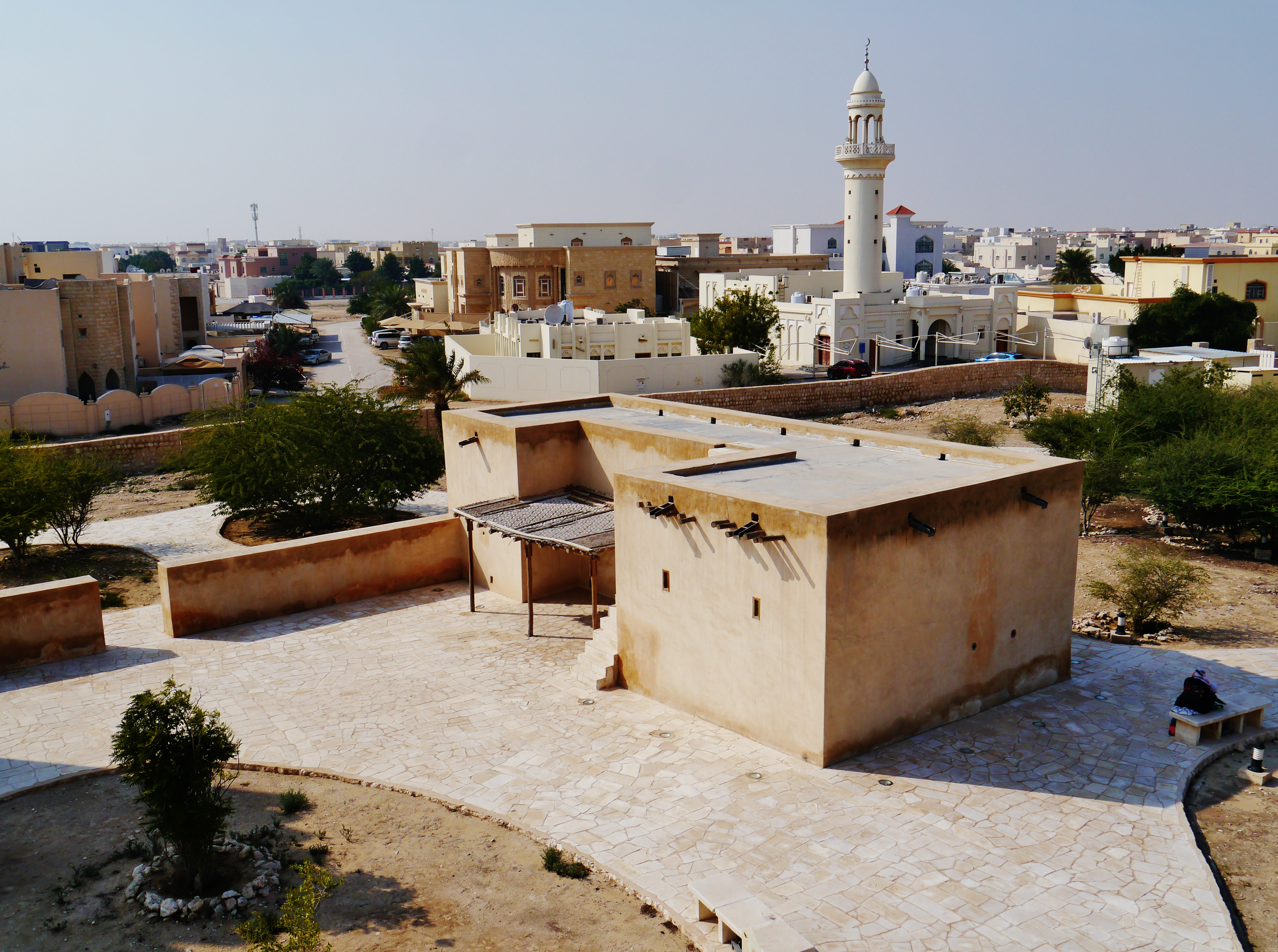
Overview of Umm Salal Mohammed from one of the Barzan Towers

"Umm" is Arabic for "mother", while salal refers to large rocks or stones. Hence, the name translates literally to "mother of rocks". The municipality was named for the numerous rock formations found in the area, in a similar fashion to Umm Salal Mohammed and Umm Salal Ali.

== History ==
Umm Salal was established as a municipality in 1972. On 29 November 1974, Mohammad bin Jaber Al Thani, a former minister of the Municipality and Urban Planning, became the municipality's first director. As of 2017, Rashid Ahmed Al-Kaabi is the director of Umm Salal Municipality.

== Geography ==
Umm Salal shares land borders with Doha to the southeast, Al Rayyan to the south, Al-Shahaniya to the west, Al Khor to the north, and Al Daayen to the east. It does not have a coastline. Occupying roughly 2.7% of Qatar's territory, the municipality is relatively small in size. Its landscape consists of many open spaces and rock formations.

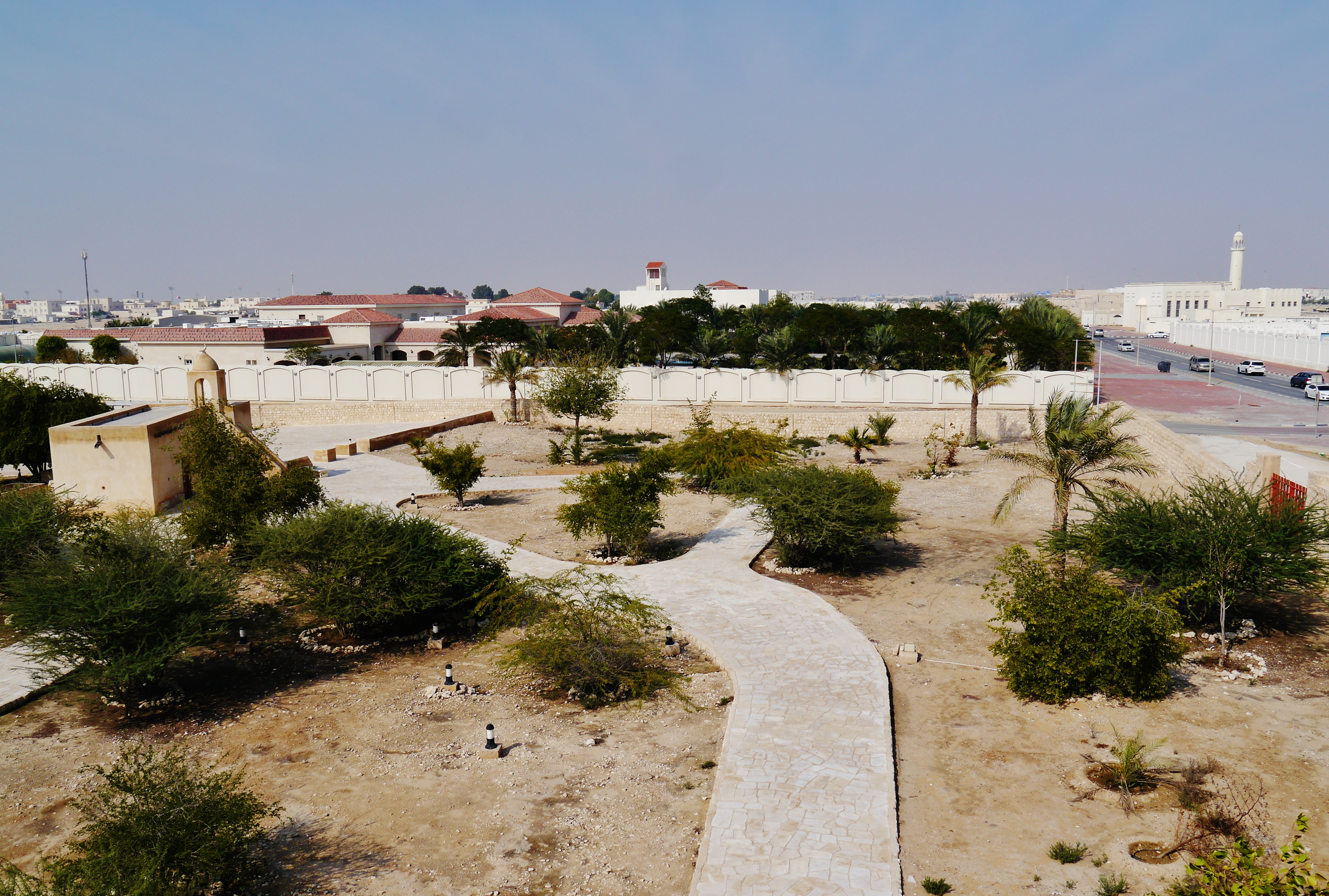
View of Umm Salal Mohammed

The northern portion of the municipality is largely agricultural due to the presence of a large aquifer, and it accommodates a number of small villages and farms. Saina Al-Humaidi, at a distance of 5 km north of Umm Salal Ali, is the main urban settlement located in the north. Government land grants have expanded the boundaries of Saina Al-Humaidi in recent years, and it is being developed as a residential center for the nearby rural communities.

In the municipality's southern portion, Umm Salal Mohammed constitutes part of the Doha Metropolitan Area. Slightly to the north is Umm Salal Ali, which is also considered to be within the Doha Metropolitan Area's boundaries, albeit to a much lesser extent. These two towns have fueled a large part of the municipality's southern growth.

Umm Salal's eastern and western segments are divided by the path of the national utilities corridor. Desert mainly dominates the western section, which has few settlements. The eastern section is highly urbanized and adjacent to Al Shamal Road.

According to the Ministry of Municipality and Environment (MME), the municipality accommodates 21 rawdas (sunken landform), 10 wadis (river valleys), 20 jeris (streams), and three hills.

== Administrative divisions ==
The municipality is divided into one zone which is then divided into 355 blocks.

=== Administrative zones ===
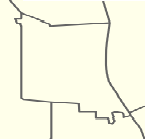
Approximate locations of census districts of Umm Salal.

The following zone was recorded in the 2015 population census:

Zone no.	Census districts	Area (km²)	Population (2015)
71	Bu Fasseela; Izghawa; Al Kharaitiyat; Umm Salal Ali; Umm Salal Mohammed; Saina Al-Humaidi; Umm Al Amad; Umm Ebairiya	318.4	90,835
71	Municipality	318.4	90,835

=== Districts ===
Other settlements in Umm Salal include:

- Abu Thaylah (Arabic: أبو ثيلة)
- Al Froosh (Arabic: الفروش)
- Al Mazrouah (Arabic: المزروعه)
- Jeri Al Samir (Arabic: جري السمر)
- Jeri Khabbab (Arabic: جري خباب)
- Muaither Al Dasem (Arabic: معيذر الدسم)
- Muaither Al Meshaf (Arabic: معيذر المشاف)
- Rawdat Al `Ajuz (Arabic: رَوْضَة اَلْعَجُوز)
- Umm Shaharain (Arabic: ام اشهرين)
- Wadi Al Askar (Arabic: وادي العسكر)
- Wadi Al Waab (Arabic: وادي الوعب)

== Economy ==
As of 2017, most of the industry that takes place within Umm Salal's boundaries is centered on construction, at 3,200 employees, with agriculture coming second at 2,000 employees, and retail and services trades in third, numbering 1,500 employees. A vast majority of the municipality's inhabitants work outside the municipality.

=== Retail ===
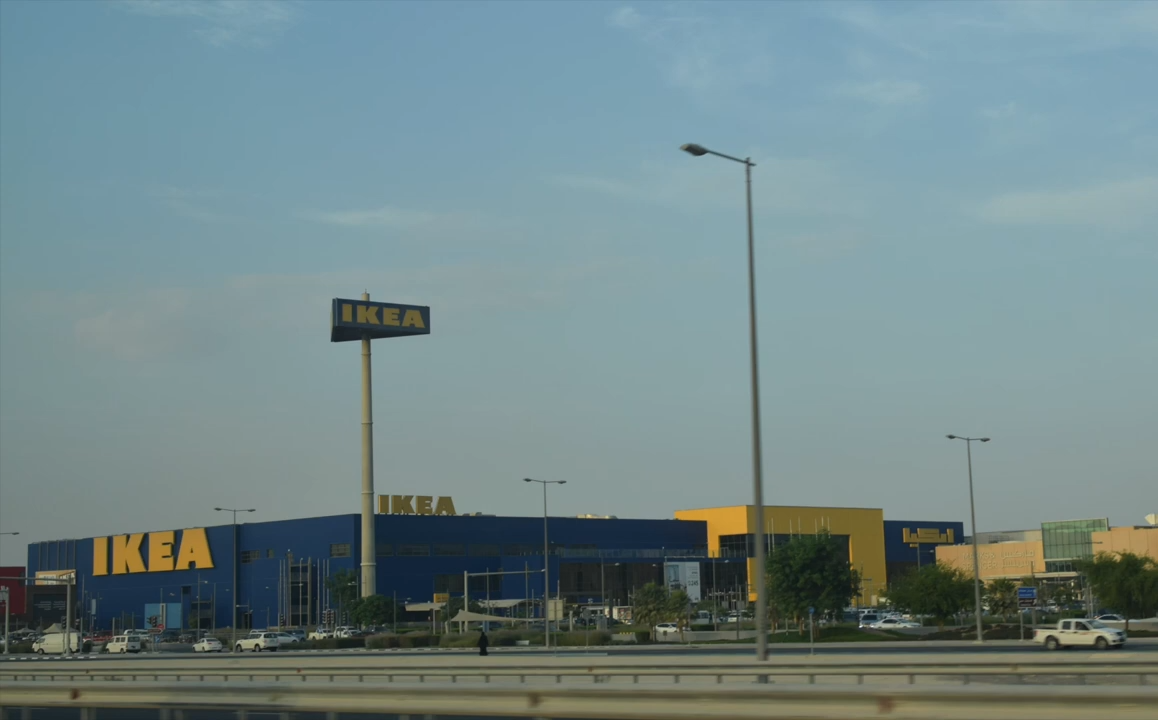
IKEA store in Doha Festival City, Umm Salal Mohammed

Qatar's largest mall, Doha Festival City, was partially opened in Umm Salal Mohammed in April 2017. Valued at QR 6.4 billion, the mall will eventually have 540 retail stores covering an area of 244,000 square meters. IKEA was the first store to be commissioned in Doha Festival City, opening its doors in March 2013.

=== Heavy industries ===
In recent years, heavy industry companies have set up in or relocated from Doha Industrial Area to Umm Salal. Factors that account for this pattern involve the finer condition of the roads, fewer transportation costs and more affordable renting of industrial buildings. It was reported that several metal fabrication and steelworks factories were being planned in 2016.

=== Logistics ===
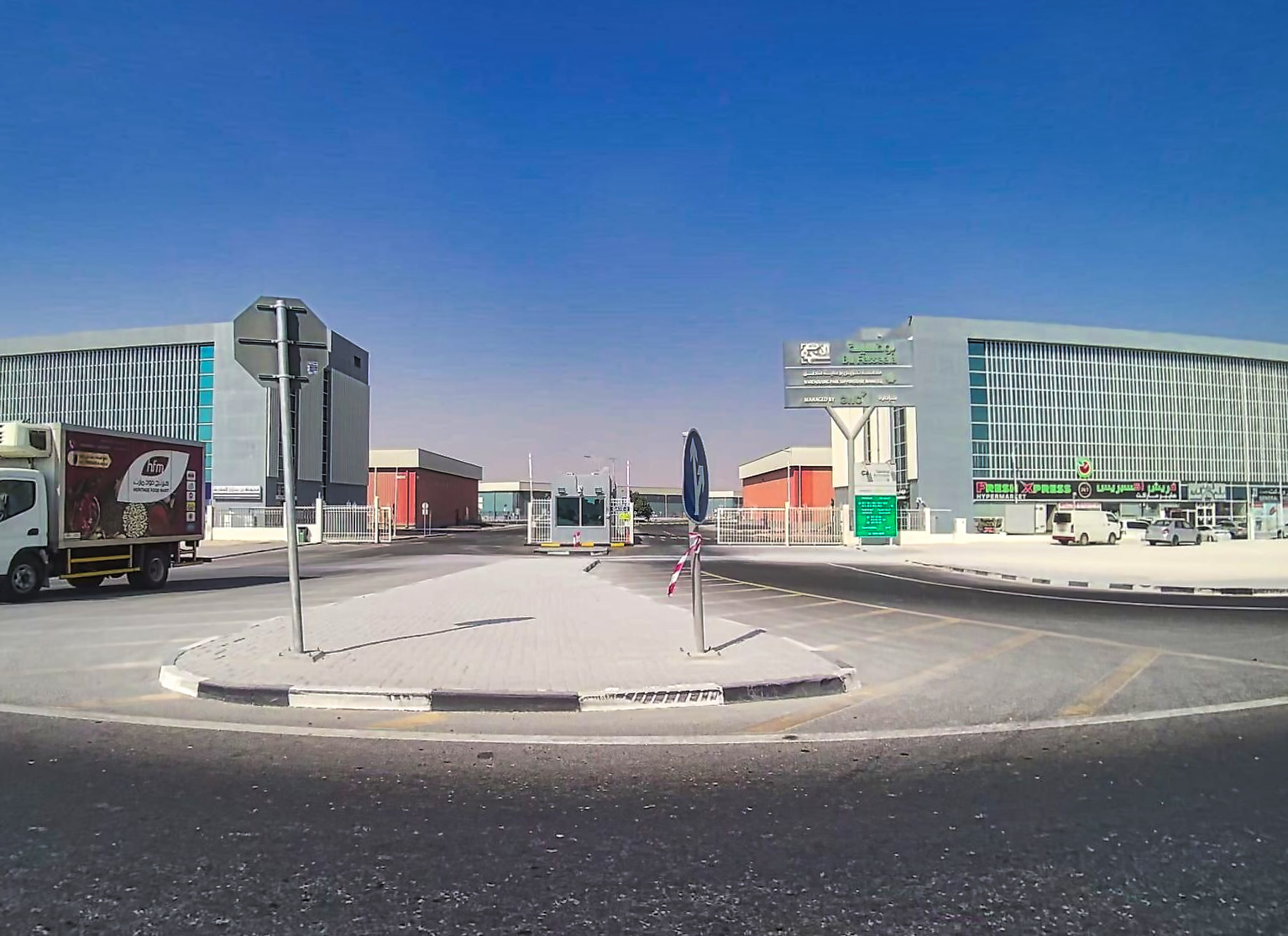
Entrance to Bu Fasseela Warehousing Park in Bu Fasseela

Major logistics centers have been set up in the south-central Umm Salal. In 2015, a QAR 133 million logistics area in Jeri Al Samir was announced by the Ministry of Economy and Trade. The area allocated for the logistics center was 74,180 square meters, and it had an estimated completion date of early 2017.

Barwa Group embarked on a QAR 395 million warehouse complex project, due to be completed in 2017, with an area 259,446 square meters in Umm Shahrayn, next to Jeri Al Samur.

One of the largest warehousing parks outside of Doha, the Bu Fasseela Warehousing Park, located in Bu Fasseela, serves several multinational companies and is spread over 496,410 square meters.

=== Agriculture ===
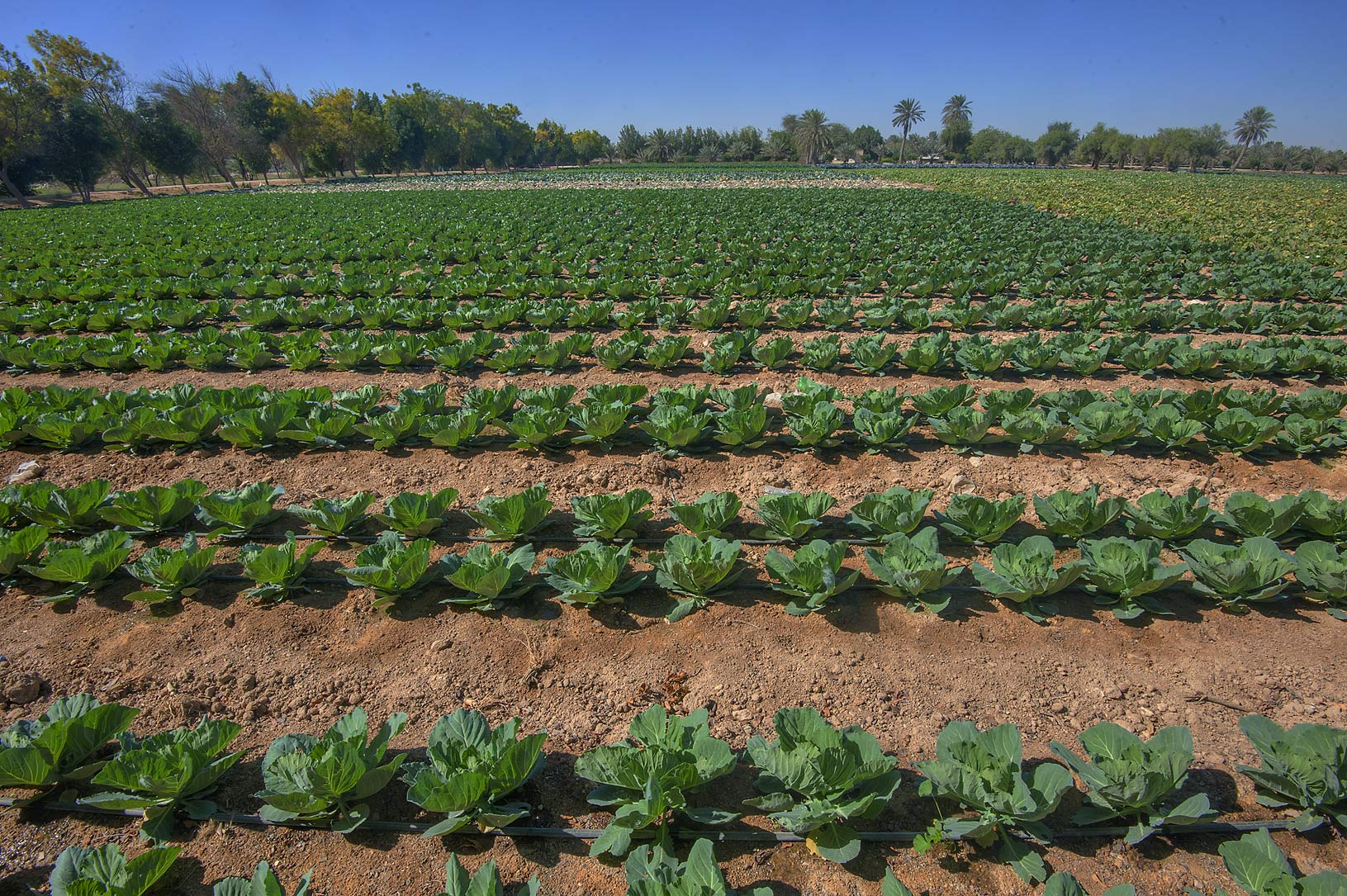
Cabbage field at Al Sulaiteen Complex in Umm Salal Ali

Agriculture plays an important role in Umm Salal's rural areas. Roughly 11% of Qatar's total farmland was found in Umm Salal in 2015, ranking third of Qatar's seven municipalities. There were 161 farms spread over 5,044 hectares, with roughly half (80) being involved in growing crops and the other half (78) being split between crops and livestock. The municipality had a livestock inventory of 41,870, the majority of which were sheep (23,607).

The majority of farms are concentrated to the east of Umm Salal Ali and in the north near Saina Al-Humaidi. Al Sulaiteen Agricultural Complex is headquartered in Umm Salal Ali. Consisting of 40 hectares of cultivable land owned by Abdullah Salem al-Sulaiteen, up to 300 tonnes of fresh produce is shipped from the farm annually. Desalination plants are also located onsite.

== Transportation ==
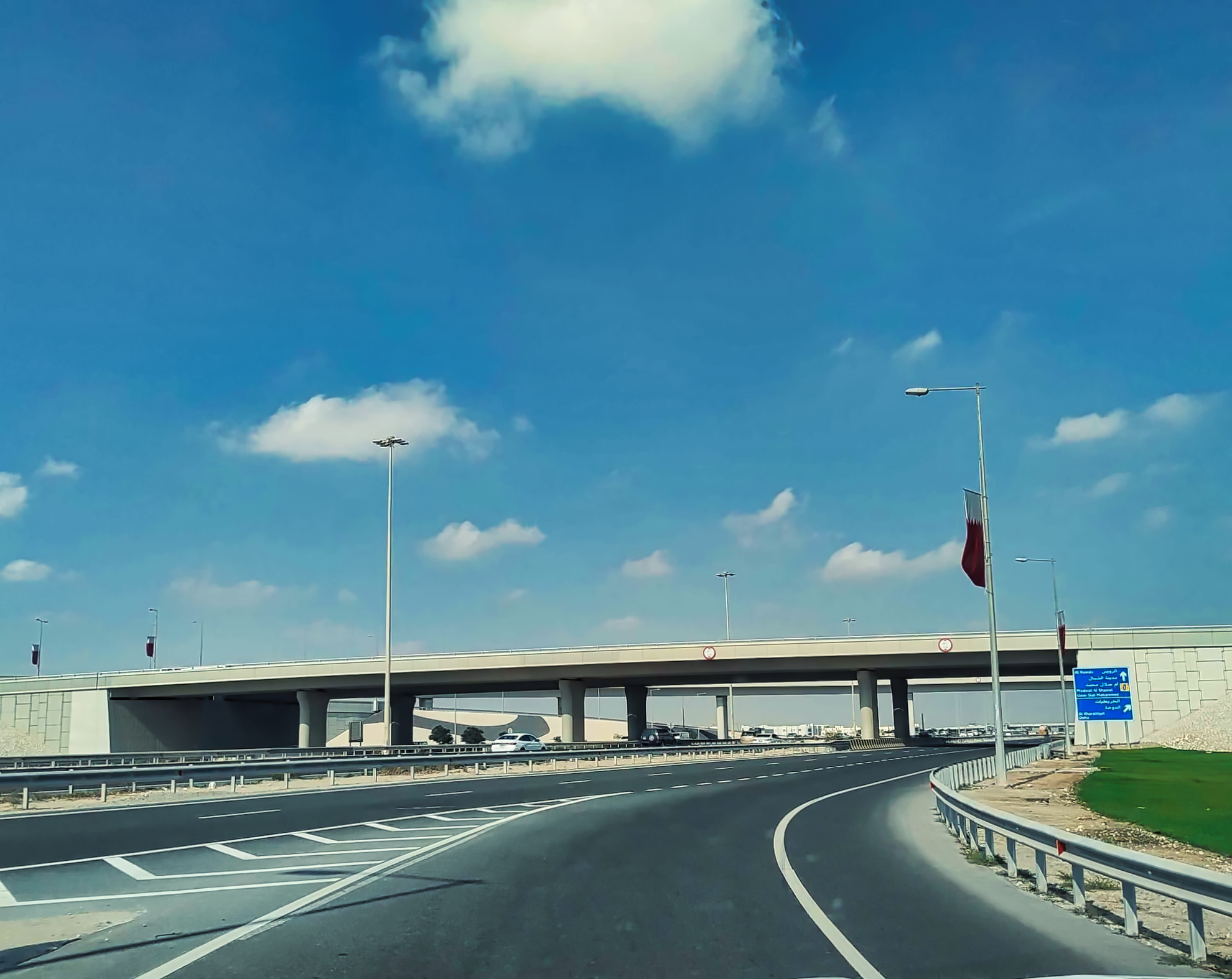
The on-ramp to Al Shamal Road near Umm Salal Mohammed, northbound

Movement into and out of the municipality is mainly facilitated by Al Shamal Road, which is on the eastern fringes, close to Al Daayen. Celebration Highway is the other major highway in Umm Salal, and connects to Dukhan Highway as well as to Al Rayyan Municipality. Public transport is poor and characterized by a lack of bus services and bus stops.

In the future, Doha Metro's Green Line will connect Doha to Umm Salal via rail. Tram stations will be located in Al Kharaitiyat, Umm Salal Mohammed, and Umm Salal Ali, the latter station being the northernmost extension of the rail network in the municipality.

== Infrastructure ==
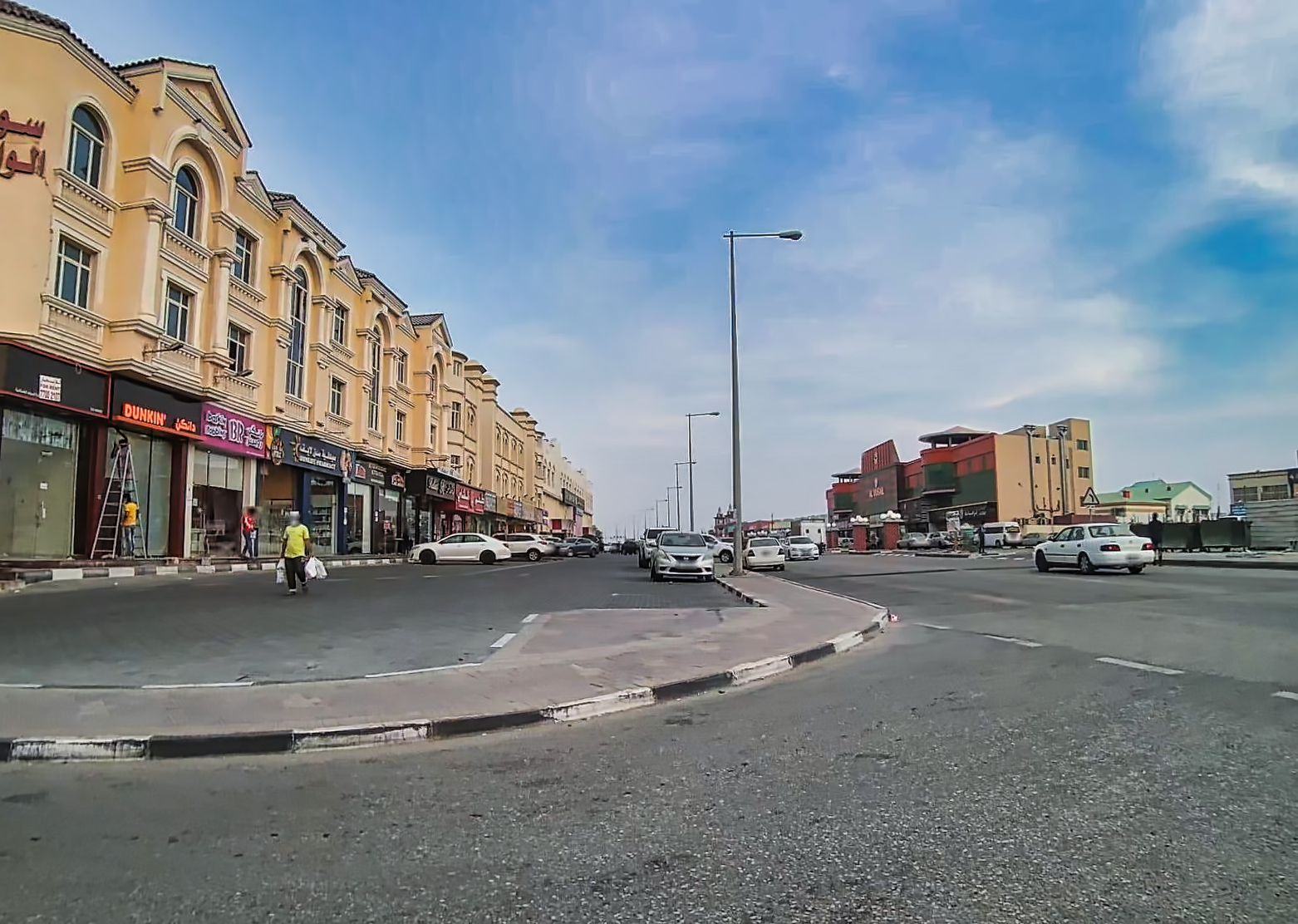
Storefronts on Umm Salal Ali Road in Umm Salal Ali

A comprehensive plan and vision released by the municipality in December 2017 outlined the Umm Salal Mohammed area as being developed as the region's administrative seat and economic hub, and Izghawa, Umm Salal Ali and Al Kharaitiyat undergoing developments to become major mixed-use residential areas.

In the southwest of the municipality, the North Gate Mixed Use development project is underway. Close to Qatar's major population centers, North Gate is planned to have 98,000 square meters dedicated to retail space, 64,000 square meters for office space and over 400 housing units and apartments.

In Umm Salal Ali, a massive sewer treatment facility was constructed at a cost of QAR 3.63 billion and became fully functional in February 2016. It has the capacity to process 245,000 cubic meters of sewage daily.

== Education ==
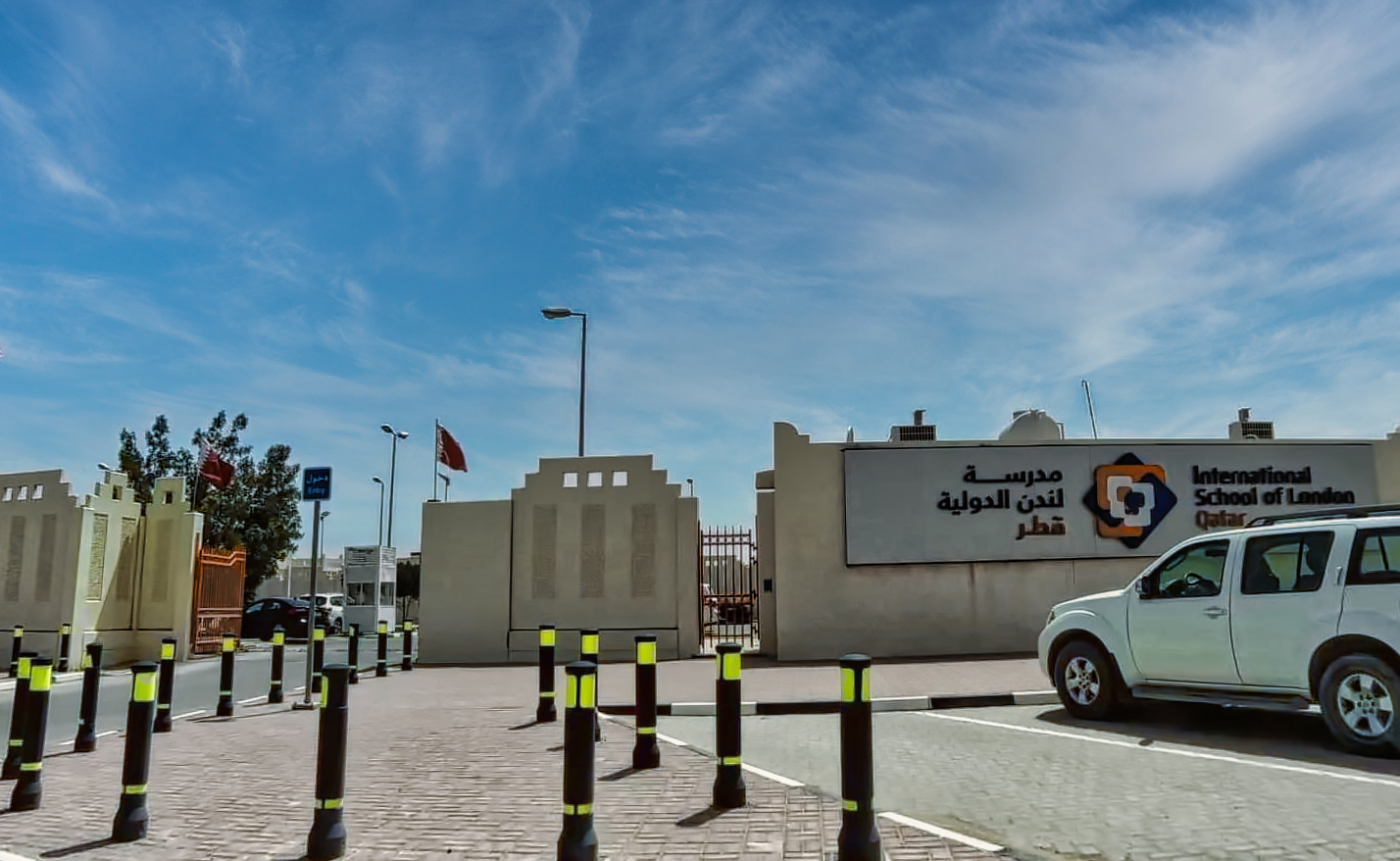
Entrance to the International School of London Qatar in Umm Salal Mohammed

According to the 2016 education census, sixteen public schools operated in Umm Salal at the time. Half of the schools were exclusively for girls and the other half were reserved for boys. Female students numbered at 3,814, outnumbering the 3,549 male students.

A number of private international schools also have a presence in Umm Salal, such as the Royal Grammar School, Guildford, which is based in Umm Salal Mohammed and which opened to students in September 2016, in addition to the Qatar Finland International School and the International School of London Qatar, which are also based in Umm Salal Mohammed.

== Healthcare ==
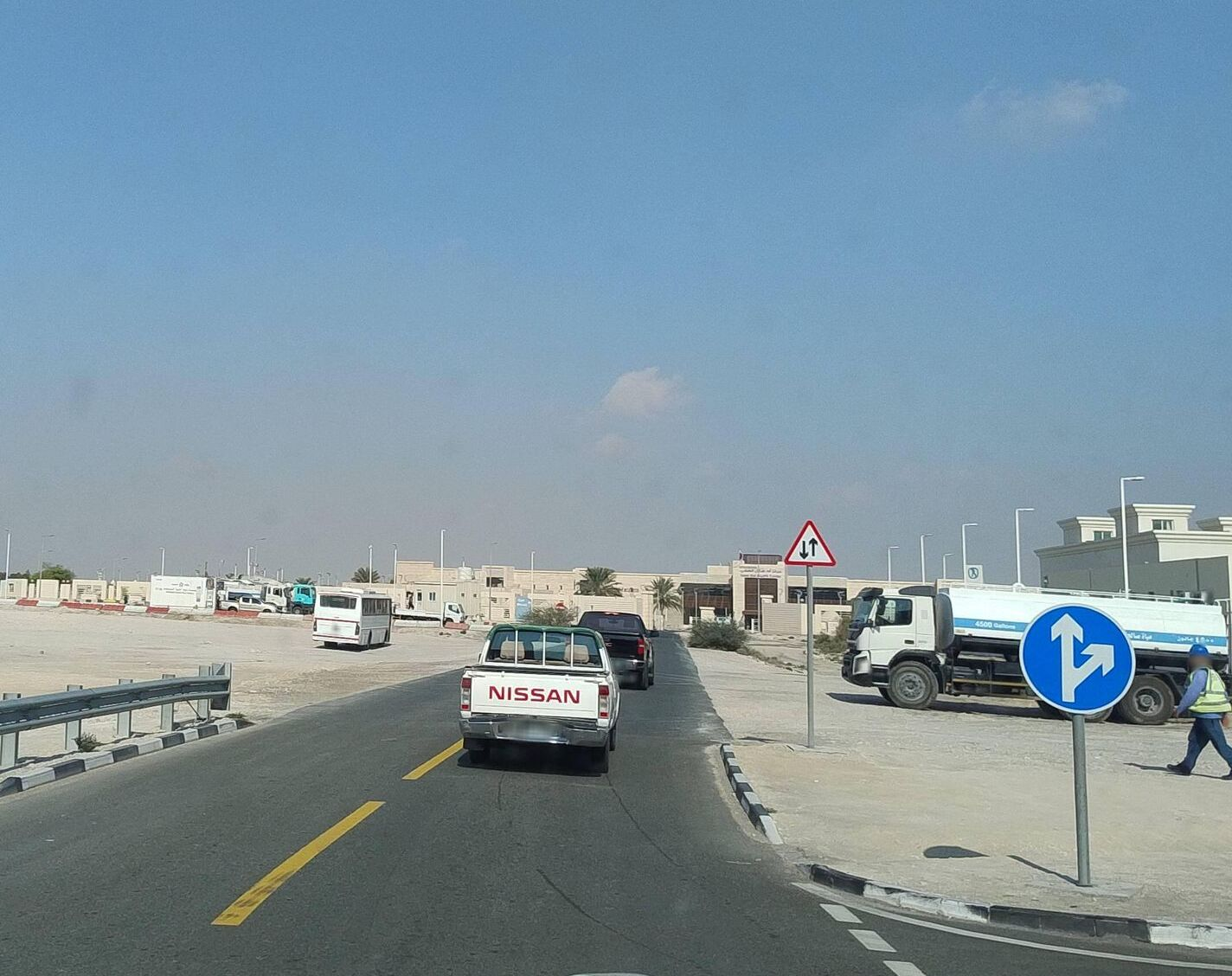
View of Umm Salal Health Centre from Street 491 in Bu Fasseela

The first primary healthcare facility to operate within Umm Salal was located in Umm Salal Ali, and opened in 1985 to serve the entire region. In July 2016, Umm Salal Health Centre opened in Bu Fasseela, spread out over an area exceeding 50,000 square meters. This inauguration came after 2.5 years of construction at a cost of QR 115 million. With the stated goal of serving a population of up to 50,000, the facility has 64 clinics, which is more than all other health care centers in Qatar.

Six pharmacies were recorded in the municipality in 2013 by Qatar's Supreme Council of Health.

== Sports ==
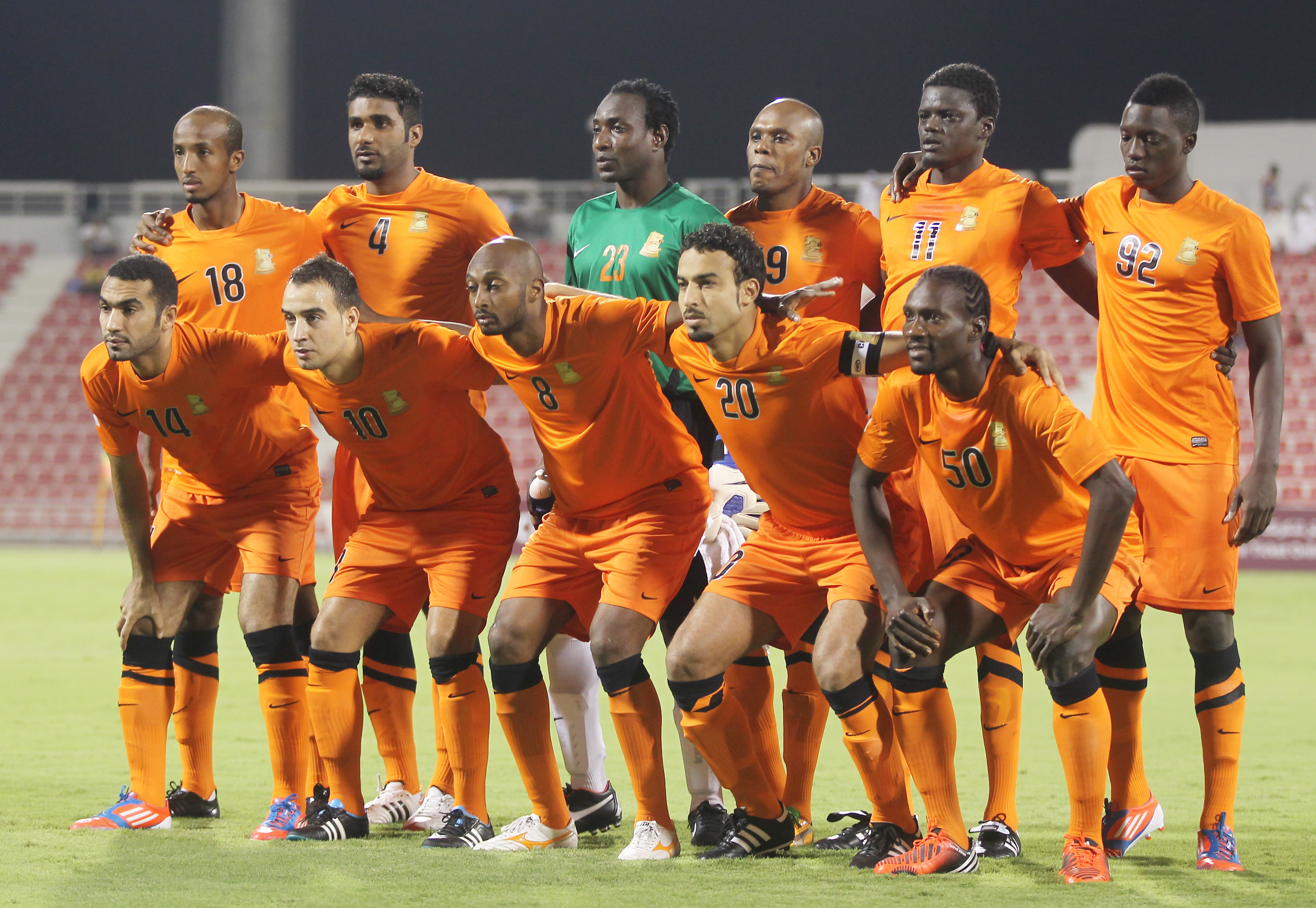
Members of the Umm Salal football team form a huddle prior to the start of their Qatar Stars League match in Doha

There are two sports clubs based in the municipality: Umm Salal SC, based in Umm Salal Ali, and Al-Kharaitiyat SC in Al Kharaitiyat. Both clubs field teams in Qatar's premier football league, the Qatar Stars League. Furthermore, Umm Salal Ali also accommodates Barzan Youth Center as well as Barzan Olympic Park.

In Umm Salal Mohammed, the Umm Salal Stadium was planned as a venue for the 2022 FIFA World Cup. It was designed by Albert Speer & Partner GmbH. The stadium was planned to support 45,120 fans and modeled after traditional Arabian forts. After the 2022 World Cup, it was planned for the stadium to decrease its capacity to 25,500 seats and be used by Umm Salal SC as their home ground.

However, it was one of the five proposed World Cup stadiums which were never built by Qatar. A major factor in its cancellation was its distance from the Doha Metro and from other accommodation and sporting venues in Doha.

== Visitor attractions ==
=== Landmarks and heritage sites ===
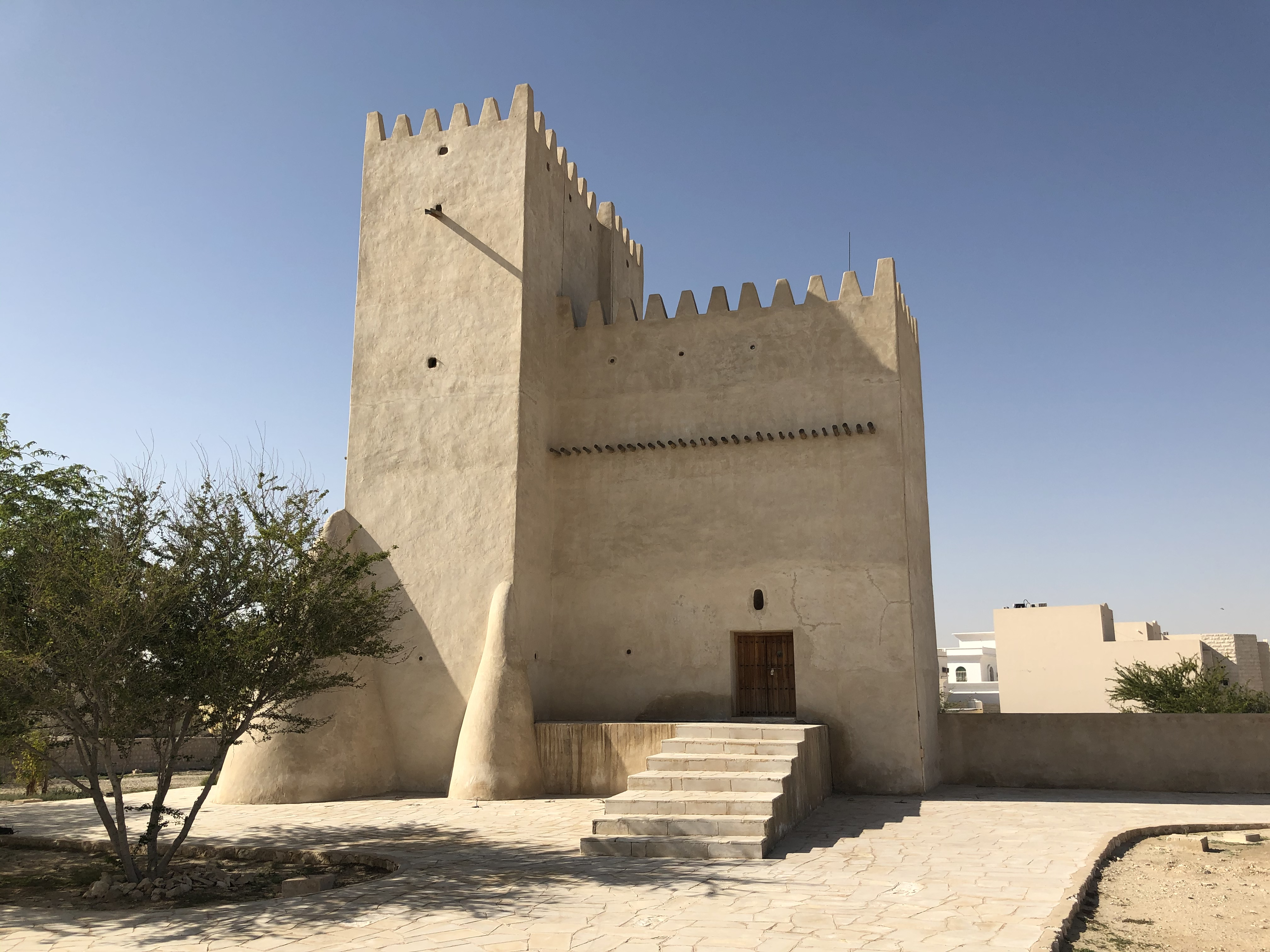
One of the Barzan Towers in Umm Salal Mohammed

Barzan Towers are located in Umm Salal Mohammed. The towers were built in the late 19th century and were renovated by Sheikh Mohammed bin Jassim Al Thani in the early 20th century to serve as guard posts for water sources and to observe the new moon during Ramadan. A third major fort can also be found in the municipality: the former palace of Jassim bin Muhammed bin Jassim Al Thani.

The grave of another member of the royal family and a former governor, Ahmed bin Muhammed Al Thani, is also a notable attraction located in the municipality.

A division of Umm Salal Mohammed is being sectioned off as a heritage quarter. This quarter will feature traditional Qatari architecture and neighborhoods (known as fereej), and will have safeguards in place to ensure they are preserved in their original state.

=== Parks ===
Overall, five parks are located in the municipality as of June 2018. In December 2014, municipal authorities unveiled Umm Salal Park near Barzan Towers in Umm Salal Mohammed. The park will serve the entire central region of Umm Salal. Spread over an area of 12,272 square meters, Umm Salal Park is equipped with a footpath, children's play area, landscaped plants, a cafeteria, and a prayer area. During the same period, a park south of Umm Salal Mohammed in Al Kharaitiyat was opened. Intended to serve the southern regions of Al Kharaitiyat and Izghawa, the park is set over a 2,094 square meter area. Two other parks also exist in this area, with Izghawa hosting the massive 14,000 square meter Izghawa Park and another park in Al Kharaitiyat which occupies 5,836 square meters.

The Mohamed bin Jassim Park became the second park in Umm Salal Mohammed to open in May 2017. It spans an area of 5,988 square meters and features a cafeteria, children's play area and 13 different species of plants.

=== Protected areas ===
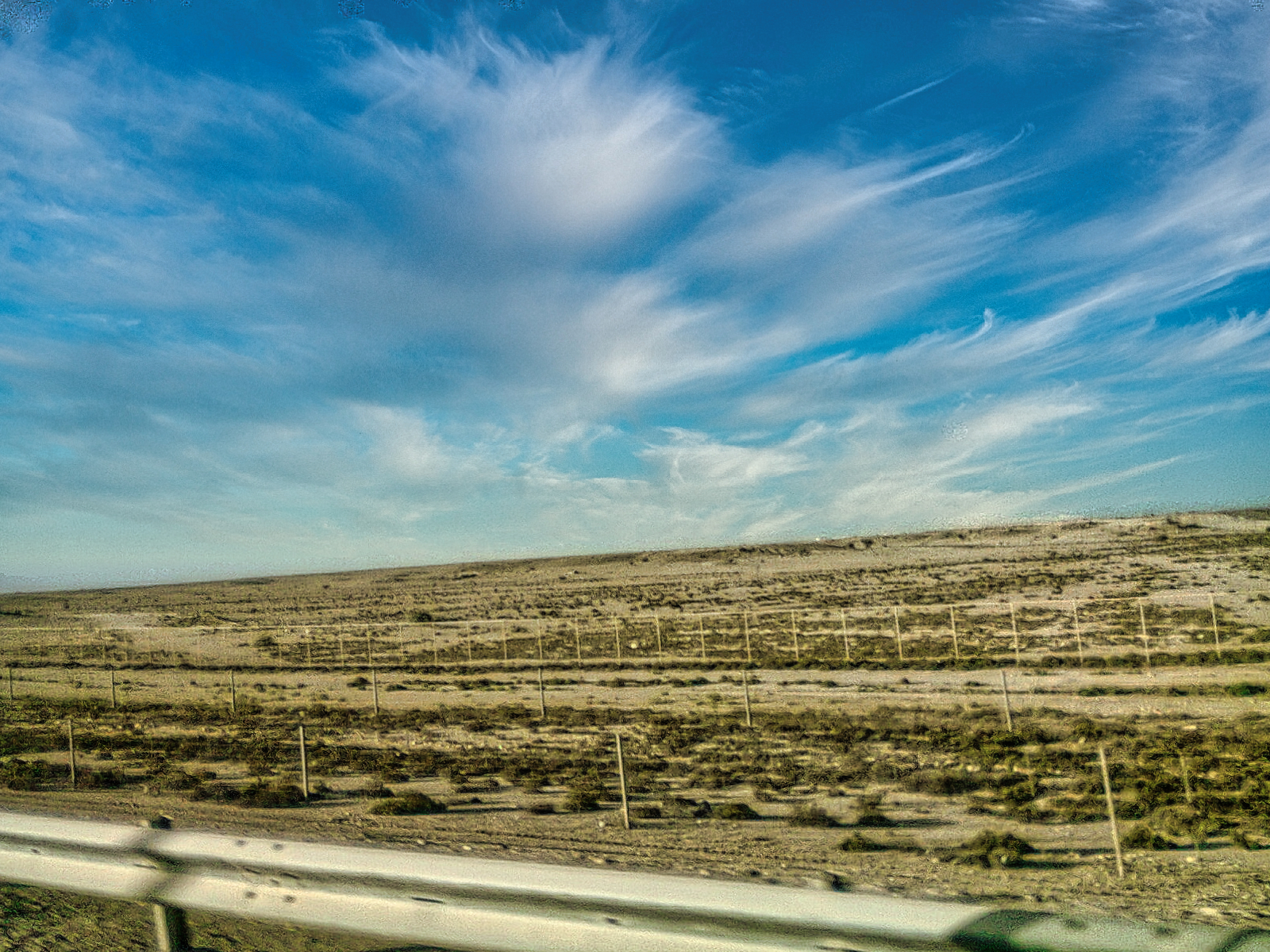
Desert scrub near Umm Al Amad

Three protected environmental areas are found in the municipality. The first, Sunai, is 4 square kilometers and is situated to the north of Umm Al Amad. It was given legal protection to preserve its biodiversity and to prevent the negative effects of urbanization. The second area is Umm Al Amad reserve, which spans 5.72 square kilometers and is typified by its abundance of vegetation. Finally, Wadi Sultan occupies an area of 1 square kilometers and is west of Al Kharaitiyat.

It was announced in late 2016 that the largest-ever human-made forest will be established next to the sewage treatment plant in Umm Salal Ali. Set to span 8.3 square kilometers, the forest will contain close to 100,000 trees. Treated water from the plant will be used to irrigate the forest. Combined costs of sewage treatment plant and the forest are close to $3.65 billion.

== Demographics ==
Historical population
Year	Pop.	±%
1986	11,161	—
1997	18,392	+64.8%
2004	31,547	+71.5%
2010	60,509	+91.8%
2015	90,835	+50.1%
census;estimate

As of the 2015 population census, Umm Salal's population stood at 90,835. Municipal officials estimated that the population would increase to 104,100 by 2017 as a result of an influx of migrant workers before decreasing by 2032. Most of the growth is expected to happen near the border with Doha Municipality.

In 2010, males accounted for 60.7% of the population while females made up 39.3% of the population. The overall literacy rate was 95.9%. Age-wise, 22.2% of the population was under 15 and the remaining 77.8% was above the age of 15.

The following table is a breakdown of registered live births by nationality and sex for Umm Salal. Places of birth are based on the home municipality of the mother at birth.

Registered live births by nationality and sex
Year	Qatari			Non-Qatari			Total		
Year	M	F	Total	M	F	Total	M	F	Total
1984	97	102	199	79	64	143	176	166	342
1985	101	75	176	92	79	171	193	154	347
1986	94	71	165	84	82	166	178	153	331
1987	108	100	208	83	91	174	191	191	382
1988	107	98	205	96	90	186	203	188	391
1989	114	94	208	89	96	185	203	190	393
1990	98	86	184	104	85	189	202	171	373
1991	105	108	213	60	72	132	165	180	345
1992	122	105	227	68	68	136	190	173	363
1993	113	130	243	68	65	133	181	195	376
1994	N/A								
1995	131	129	260	71	61	132	202	190	392
1996	175	157	332	64	65	129	239	222	461

Registered live births by nationality and sex
Year	Qatari			Non-Qatari			Total		
Year	M	F	Total	M	F	Total	M	F	Total
1997	147	151	298	74	62	136	221	213	434
1998	162	155	317	67	64	131	229	219	448
1999	190	159	349	80	63	143	270	222	492
2000	192	171	363	81	68	149	273	239	512
2001	196	162	358	101	78	179	297	240	537
2002	216	179	395	93	73	166	309	252	561
2003	215	216	431	89	85	174	304	301	605
2004	270	222	492	98	100	198	368	322	690
2005	229	270	499	110	95	205	339	365	704
2006	275	248	523	96	126	222	371	374	745
2007	335	300	635	118	115	233	453	415	868
2008	290	279	569	150	168	318	440	447	887
2009	345	339	684	146	134	280	491	473	964
