= Rawḑat al ʽAjūz =

Rawdat Al ʽAjuz رَوْضَة اَلْعَجُوز
- Location within Qatar
- Coordinates: 25°33′N 51°23′E
- Country: Qatar
- Municipality: Umm Salal
- Zone: Zone 71

Rawdat Al ʽAjuz (Arabic: رَوْضَة اَلْعَجُوز, romanized: Rawḑat al ʽAjūz) is a rural district in Qatar, located in the municipality of Umm Salal. It is located near the border with Al Khor Municipality.

== Etymology ==
In Arabic, rawda refers to a depression that holds water and is rich in vegetation. Because of this, they are usually favored grazing spots for Bedouins. The second part, ʽajouz, is the Arabic term for "old woman". According to local tradition, the area was named for an elderly woman who owned a farm as well as a herd of cattle, all of which perished in one day during a severe cold spell.

== History ==
J.G. Lorimer mentioned the area in his 1908 manuscript of the Gazetteer of the Persian Gulf. He described it as a Bedouin camping ground containing a well that lies "13 miles south-west from Khor Shaqiq and 10 from the east coast".
