= Barzan Towers =

Group of watchtowers in Qatar

Barzan Tower
- برج برزان
- Umm Salal Mohammed, Umm Salal, Qatar
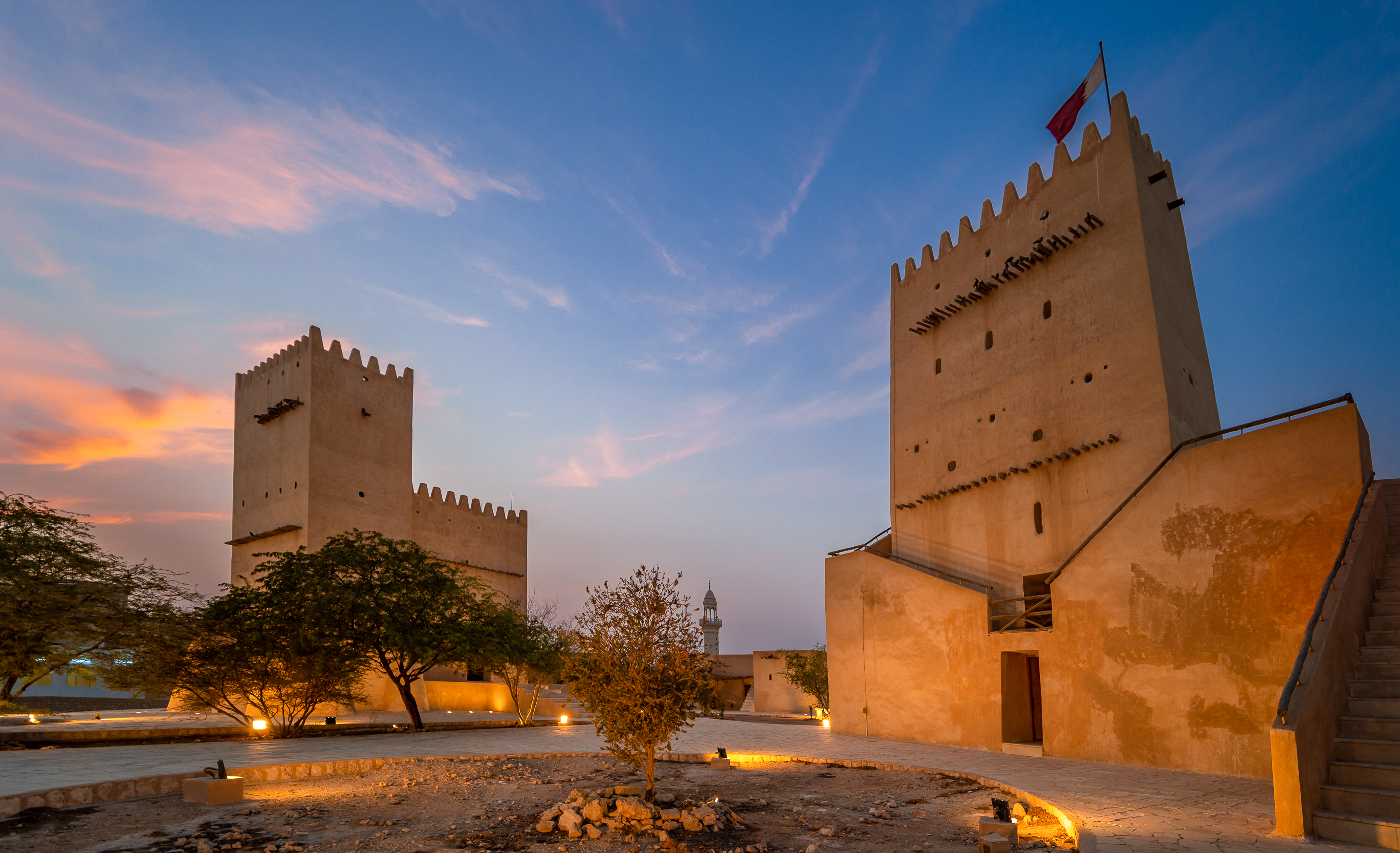
- Barzan Tower (with staircases).

Site information
- Type: Historical Watchtowers
- Owner: Qatari Government; Ministry of Tourism, Qatar Museums Authority
- Controlled by: Late 19th century–present: Qatar

Location
- Coordinates: 25.418024°N 51.413094°E
- Height: 16 m (52 ft)

Site history
- Built: Late 19th century
- In use: 1910–2003: Watchtowers; 2003–present: Museum

The Barzan Towers (Arabic: برج برزان, lit. 'high place'), also known as the Umm Salal Mohammed Fort Towers, are watchtowers that were built in the late 19th century and renovated in 1910 by Sheikh Mohammed bin Jassim Al Thani. They are located at the southern side of the defensive system established at the end of the 19th century and start of the 20th century to protect the rawda, a depression where precious rainwater is collected after flowing downward from higher ground. In Arabic, barzan means "high place".

The buildings were restored in 2003. The towers measure 16 m (52 ft) high. The fort links to two other fortified buildings towards the west and another tower towards the north. Barzan Towers may have been built near the sea to keep an observant eye on pearl divers, as a look-out for approaching ships, and as an observatory for tracking the moon. The Barzan Towers have been rebuilt with features such as air-conditioners.

Originally built with coral rock and limestone cementing the structures featured traditional Qatari design and building methods including marazim wooden channels to drain rainwater during storms away from the building walls, a majilis room between the towers to receive guests, and four-layer roofs with "danchal" wood pole construction, basgijl, woven bamboo strips, mangrove mesh and a layer of compressed mud.

== History ==
The Barzan Towers were built in the late 19th century and were renovated by Sheikh Mohammed bin Jassim Al Thani in the early 20th century to serve as watchtowers against the incoming Ottoman soldiers. Although his father had defeated the Ottomans several years before in the Battle of Al Wajbah, Mohammed remained weary of renewed military tensions. They were also used by the native Qataris to scrutinize the new moon during the holy month of Ramadan, since keeping track of the moon was essential. The towers were restored in 2003 by the Qatari authorities.

== Geography ==
The Barzan Towers are situated on a low hill called Jebel Lusail in the town of Umm Salal Mohammed, in the municipality of Umm Salal that is about 10 km (6.2 mi) from the coast and 15 km (9.3 mi) north of Doha, the capital city of Qatar. On one side of the towers, huge, modern houses stand, while on the other are makeshift shacks. The former fortified house, sometimes referred to as castle, of Sheikh Jassim bin Mohammed Al Thani is located beside the towers. An oasis full of green trees, animals and palm trees can also be found behind the towers.

== Structure ==
The Barzan Towers have walls which are 1 metre (3.3 ft) thick at the base, and are further reinforced by buttresses. One tower has walls in the form of cones and a massive staircases in the other. These walls were built by first merging and blending overlapping raw pieces of coral stones with limestone and cementing the two with a mud mortar after, which is similar to the construction of the walls of Al Zubara Fort. The walls were then covered with a gypsum-based plaster once dry. The Barzan Towers have a roof that was built with four layers. The first layer is composed of a series of danchal wood poles, which were sometimes painted with bitumen for protection. The danchal poles were then covered by a layer of basgijl, a layer of woven bamboo strips. A carefully constructed net of mangrove branches was added, followed by a layer of compressed mud to protect the towers from the sun during the hot summers. The towers were also built with some external features such as a room for receiving guests, called majilis, which was built as an L-shaped pavilion with windows for ventilation, and a mosque which has a prayer room that was also used as a school for teaching the Quran to children, called madrassa. Traditional marazims protect the walls' surfaces and were built as wooden channels that stretch out from the roof to drain rainwater in case of storms. The marazims were built on top of the majilis and the mosque.

== Gallery ==
Click on the thumbnail to enlarge.

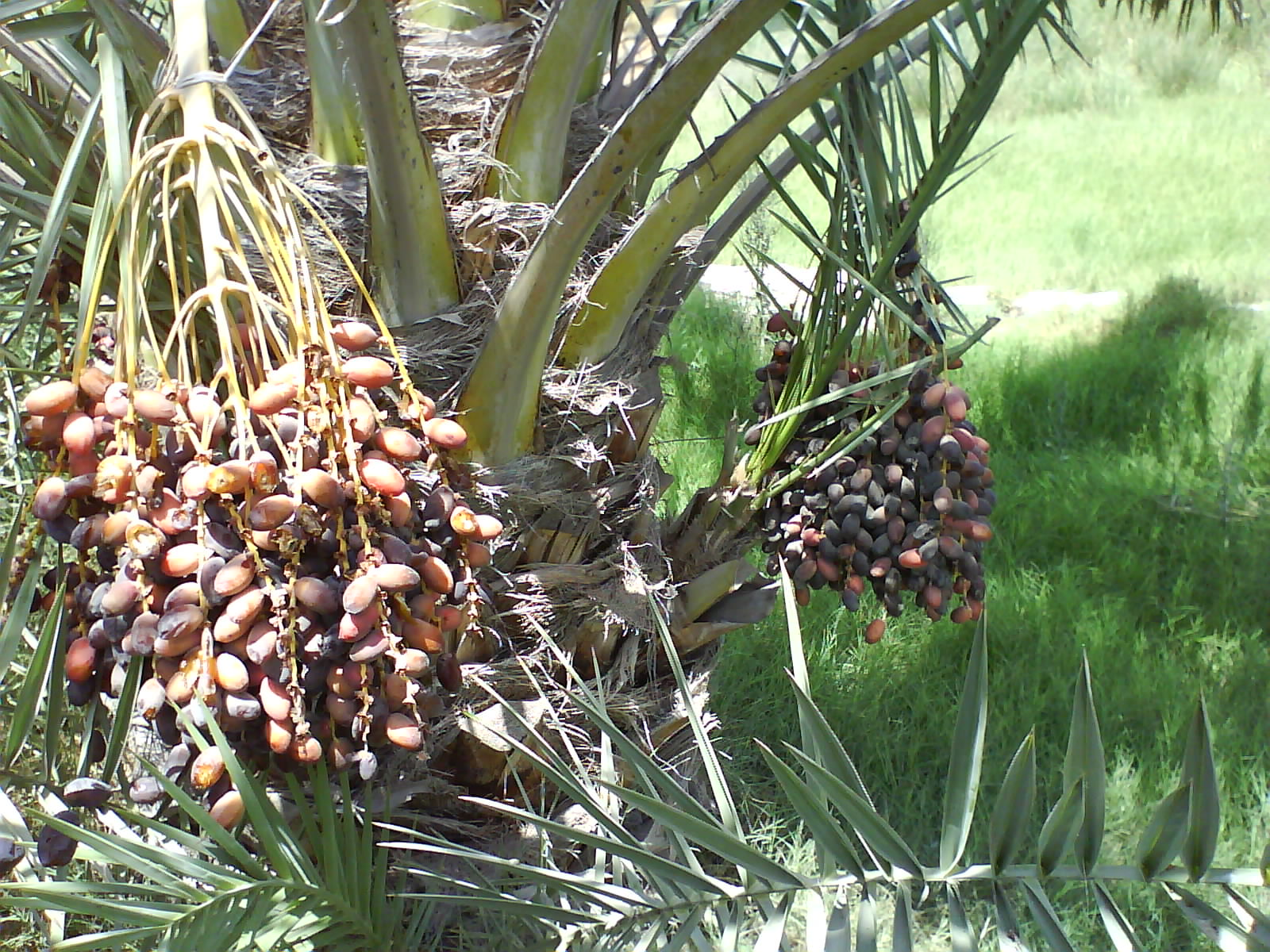
Date palms in the oasis near the Barzan Towers, showing signs of vegetation in the barren desert.

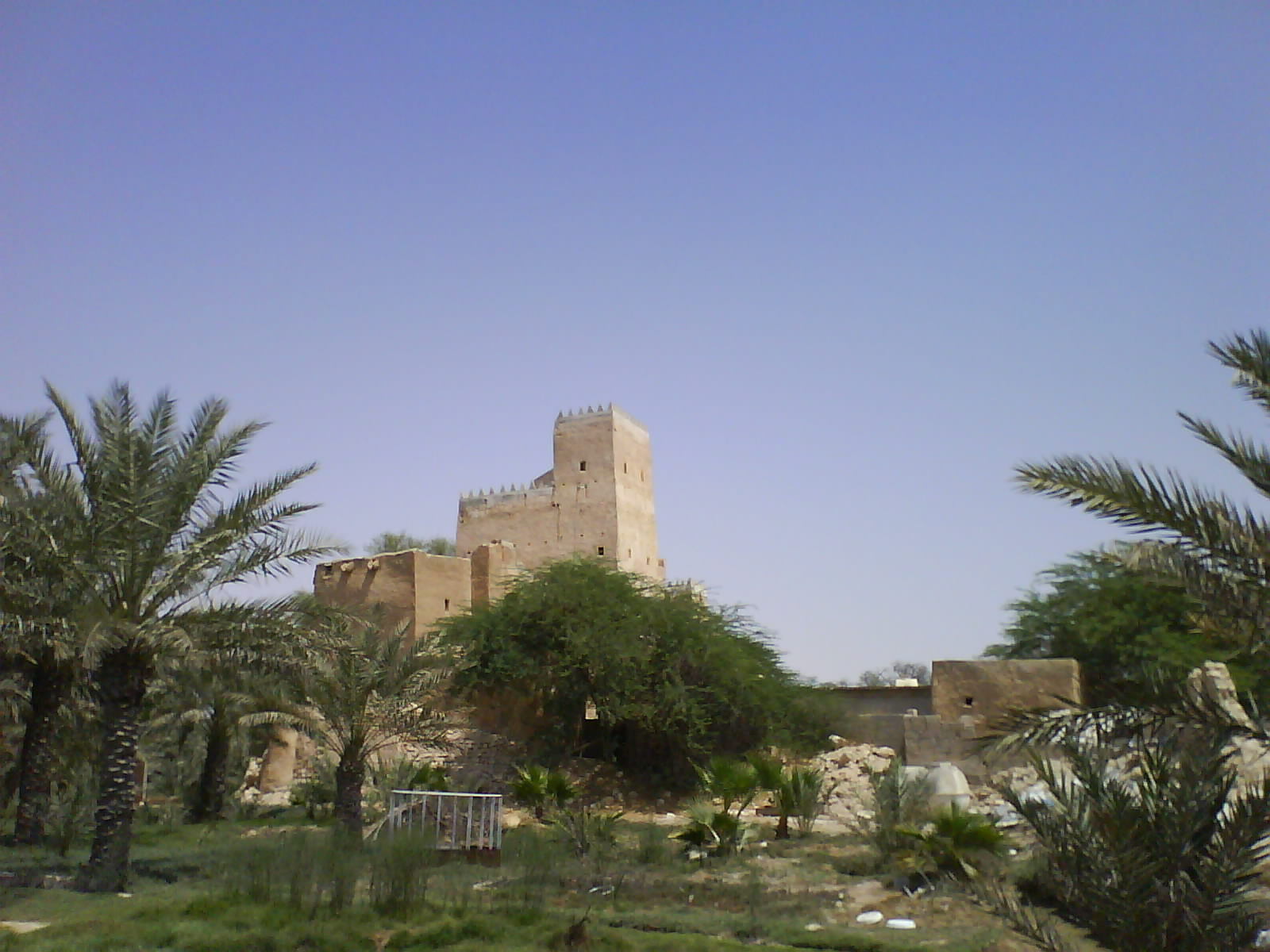
Barzan Tower (with cones), viewed from the side.

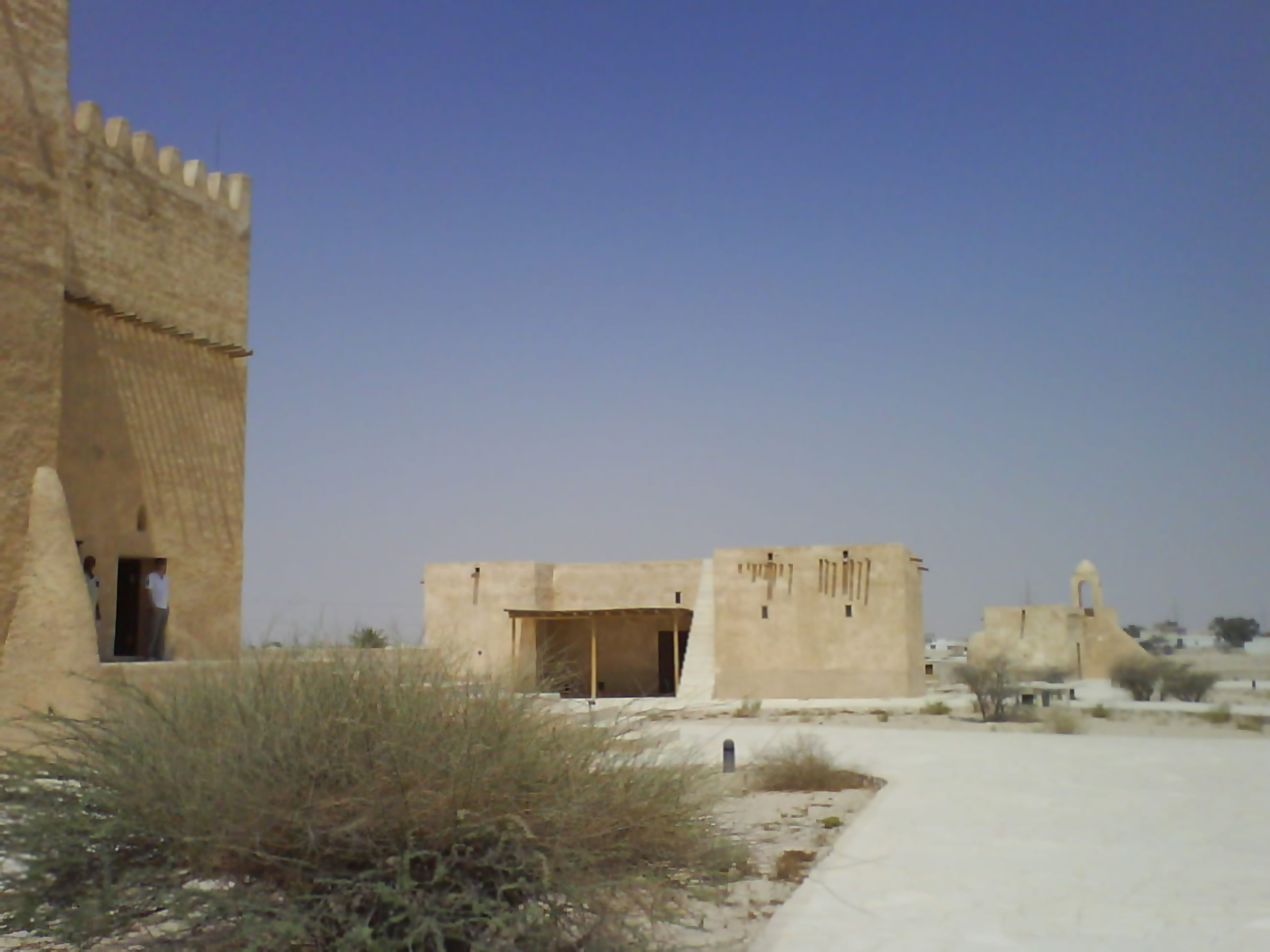
Umm Salal Muhammed Fort. In Arabic barzan means "high place".

== See also ==
- Lusail
- Al Koot Fort
- Zubarah Fort
