= Zone 71, Qatar =

Zone 71
- Zone
- Interactive map of Zone 71
- Coordinates: 25.465510°N 51.353947°E
- Country: Qatar
- Municipality: Umm Salal
- Blocks: 355

Area
  - Total: 318.4 km^{2} (122.9 sq mi)

Population (2015)
  - Total: 90,835
- Time zone: UTC+03 (Arabia Standard Time)
- ISO 3166 code: QA-US

Zone 71 is the only zone in the municipality of Umm Salal in the state of Qatar. The main districts recorded in the 2015 population census were Bu Fasseela, Izghawa, Al Kharaitiyat, Umm Salal Ali, Umm Salal Mohammed, Saina Al-Humaidi, Umm Al Amad, and Umm Ebairiya.

Other districts which fall within its administrative boundaries are Abu Thaylah, Al Froosh, Al Mazrouah, Jeri Al Samir, Jeri Khabbab, Muaither Al Dasem, Muaither Al Meshaf, Rawdat al `Ajuz, Umm Shaharain, Wadi Al Askar, and Wadi Al Waab.

== Demographics ==
Year	Population
1986	9,448
1997	15,935
2004	25,413
2010	60,509
2015	90,835

== Land use ==
The Ministry of Municipality and Environment (MME) breaks down land use in the zone as follows.

Area (km^{2})	Developed land (km^{2})	Undeveloped land (km^{2})	Residential (km^{2})	Commercial/ Industrial (km^{2})	Education/ Health (km^{2})	Farming/ Green areas (km^{2})	Other uses (km^{2})
318.45	112.73	205.71	9.20	1.36	0.60	62.92	38.65
