= Umm Salal Mohammed =

Umm Salal Mohammed أم صلال محمد
- Town
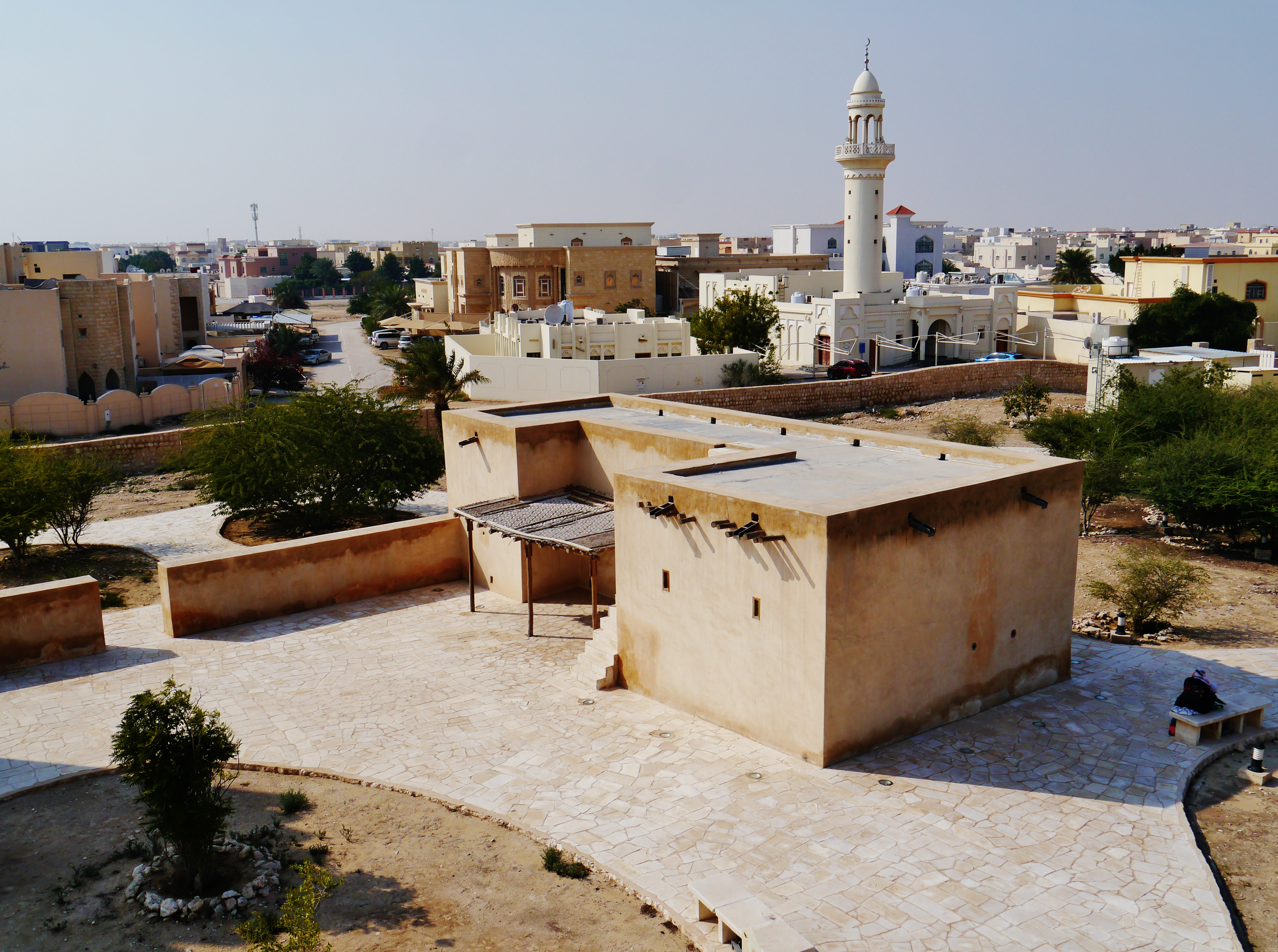
- View from the grounds of the Barzan Towers

- Location within Qatar
- Coordinates: 25°25′N 51°24′E
- Country: Qatar
- Municipality: Umm Salal
- Zone: Zone 71
- District no.: 128
- Established: 1910

Area
  - Total: 8.1 km^{2} (3.1 sq mi)

Umm Salal Mohammed (Arabic: أم صلال محمد, romanized: Umm Şalāl Muḩammad) is a town in the municipality of Umm Salal in Qatar. The town has numerous farms, wells and a large water reservoir which is filled during the rainy season.

== History ==
Umm Salal Mohammed was initially founded around 1910 by its namesake, Sheikh Mohammed bin Jassim Al Thani. He designed and oversaw the construction of the town after he had decided to refurbish the Barzan Towers to serve as his winter residence as well as an outpost to scout for incoming Ottoman troops.

In 2023, the Public Works Authority (Ashghal) initiated a major infrastructure development to improve the western sector of Umm Salal Mohammed. This project, covering an area of roughly 318 acres, is intended to support a new mixed-use neighborhood comprising hundreds of residential plots and commercial zones, six mosques, two schools, and 25 public parks. The scheme will involve the installation of over 36 kilometres (22 miles) of roadways, a combined 83 kilometres (52 miles) of wastewater and stormwater systems, and more than 21 kilometres (13 miles) of pipelines for treated water reuse. The estimated investment for the project is approximately $40 million and the anticipated completion date is around 2027.

== Geography ==
The town is bordered by Umm Salal Ali to the north, and Al Kharaitiyat to the south. Qatar's capital, Doha is located 21 km (13 mi) to the south.

Common vegetation found in Umm Salal Mohammed include brome grass (Bromus madritensis) and cheat grass (Bromus scoparius) in stony areas. Shaja (Zilla spinosa) grows abundantly in sandy depressions, while mouse barley (Hordeum murinum) is found in rocky depressions. On rare occasion, rabl (Plantago psyllium) can be found in sandy soils and near the roadside. Agathophora alopecuroides (local name hamd) and Mercurialis annua have also been recorded here.

== Visitor attractions ==
=== Barzan Towers ===
The historic Barzan Towers are situated on a low hill called Jebel Lusail in Umm Salal Muhammad. This location was chosen for its vantage point of the town and because the relatively high winds cooled those keeping watch. The towers date back to 1895 and its enclosed site was excavated by a Danish archaeological team in 1958.

=== Doha Festival City ===
Qatar's largest mall, Doha Festival City, was partially opened in Umm Salal Mohammed in April 2017. Valued at QR 6.4 billion, the mall plans to have 540 retail stores covering an area of 244,000 m^{2} (2,630,000 sq ft).

=== Parks ===
Mohammed bin Jassim Park opened to the public in May 2015. It spans an area of 5,988 m^{2} (64,450 sq ft) and features a cafeteria, children's play area and 13 different species of plants.

=== Darb Al Saai ===
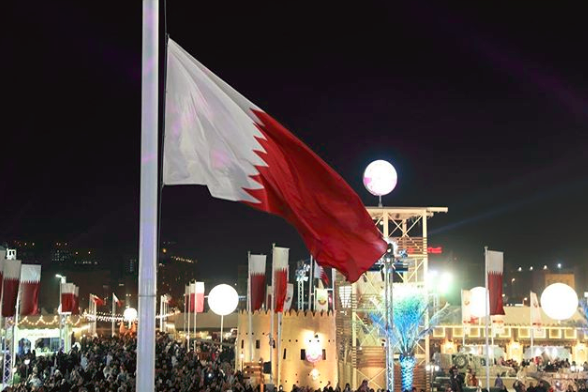
The flag-raising ceremony at Darb Al Saai

The Darb Al Saai festival, organized by Qatar's Ministry of Culture, is held annually in early December in Umm Salal Mohammed. The event runs daily for several days until the commencement of Qatar National Day on December 18 and showcases the nation's cultural heritage and national identity. The name translates to "route of the messenger" in Arabic, related to the path taken by Sheikh Jassim bin Mohammed Al Thani's messengers.

Activities include the ceremonial flag-raising at Flag Square, accompanied by military performances and displays, including horse and camel-mounted contingents, and local musicians' live performances of sea music. The event also features exhibitions, traditional crafts, and folklore. Workshops offer hands-on experiences in wool weaving, tent fabric-making, and bird photography.

Spanning a 150,000 m^{2} (1,600,000 sq ft) area in Umm Salal Mohammed, the venue's design merges traditional Qatari architecture with modern elements. Three arterial roads provide access to the venue, and the Doha Metro's Green Line is nearby. Prior to being relocated to Umm Salal Mohammed, the festival was held in the Al Sadd district of Doha. Several commercial establishments are found at Darb Al Saai Market, all with traditional names and selling local souvenirs, clothing and cuisine, including several cafés offering Arabic coffee.

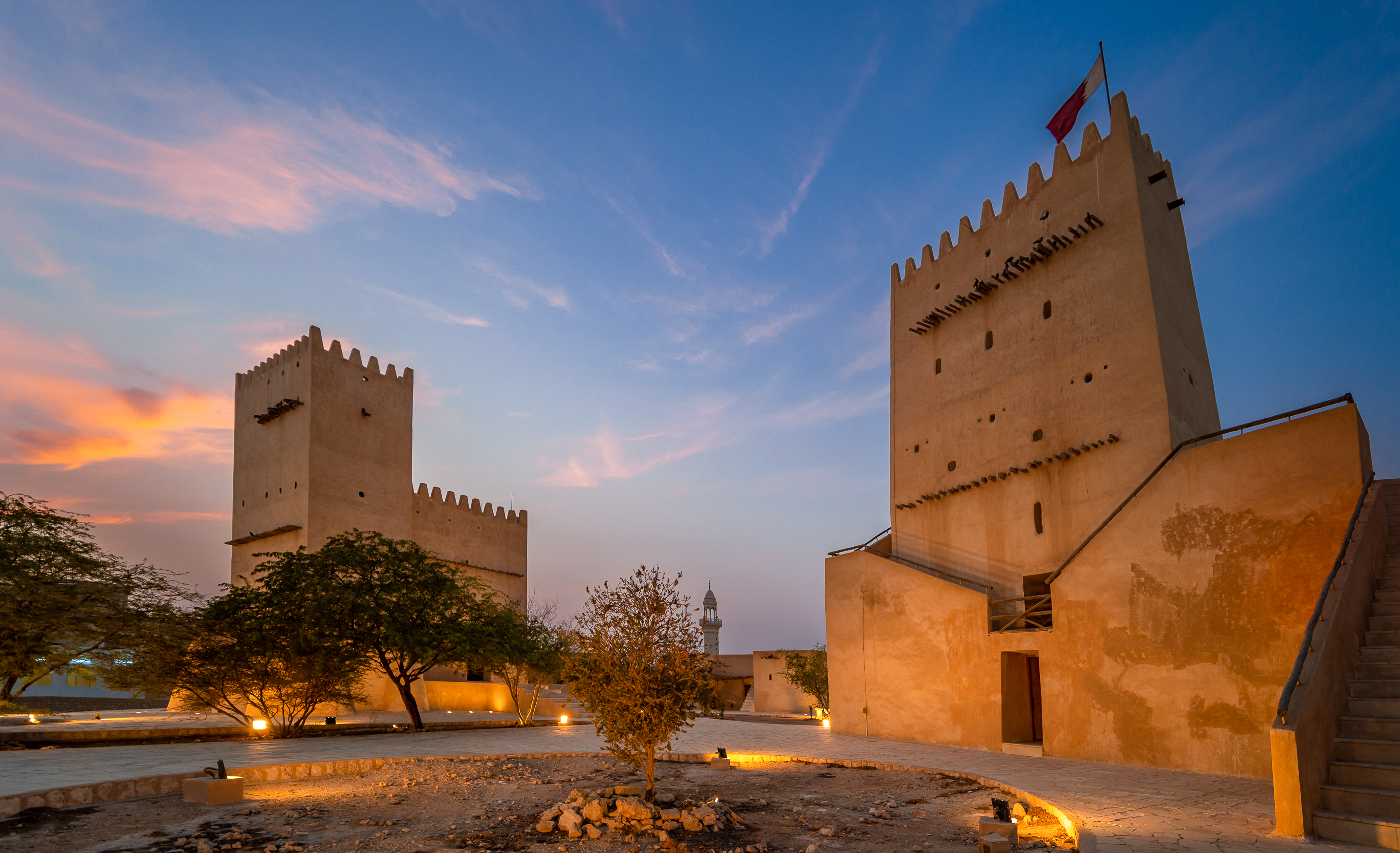
View of the iconic Barzan Towers

The Darb Al Saai venue is also used to present the culture of other countries, such as the Cultural Week of Uzbekistan held in February 2024.

== Industry ==
Delta Doha Corporation, an oilfield equipment designer and manufacturer, was founded in the town in 1995 with its initial facilities being situated on a 9,000 m^{2} (97,000 sq ft) plot of land.

The town hosts Umm Salal Nursery, one of the region's most sizable plant nurseries. It has played an important role in Qatar's preparations to host the 2022 FIFA World Cup, growing the turf and trees required for stadia and their surrounding areas. It is spread over an area of 880,000 m^{2} (9,500,000 sq ft) and in February 2018 had within it 16,000 trees and about 679,000 shrubs.

== Qatar National Master Plan ==
The Qatar National Master Plan (QNMP) is described as a "spatial representation of the Qatar National Vision 2030". As part of the QNMP's Urban Centre plan, which aims to implement development strategies in 28 central hubs that will serve their surrounding communities, Umm Salal Mohammed has been designated a Town Centre, which is the third-highest designation. It is the only Urban Centre in the municipality.

The existing site of the proposed Town Centre is largely undeveloped and situated between two metro stations on Al Shamal Highway. It will have a higher density of buildings than the town of Umm Salal Mohammed as well as distinguishable landmarks. Due to its close proximity to two metro stations, the area will have relatively high pedestrian accessibility. Among the new buildings planned are a 96,152 m^{2} (1,034,970 sq ft) girls' primary and secondary school, a kindergarten, a youth centre and a 28,189 m^{2} (303,420 sq ft) town park.

== Education ==
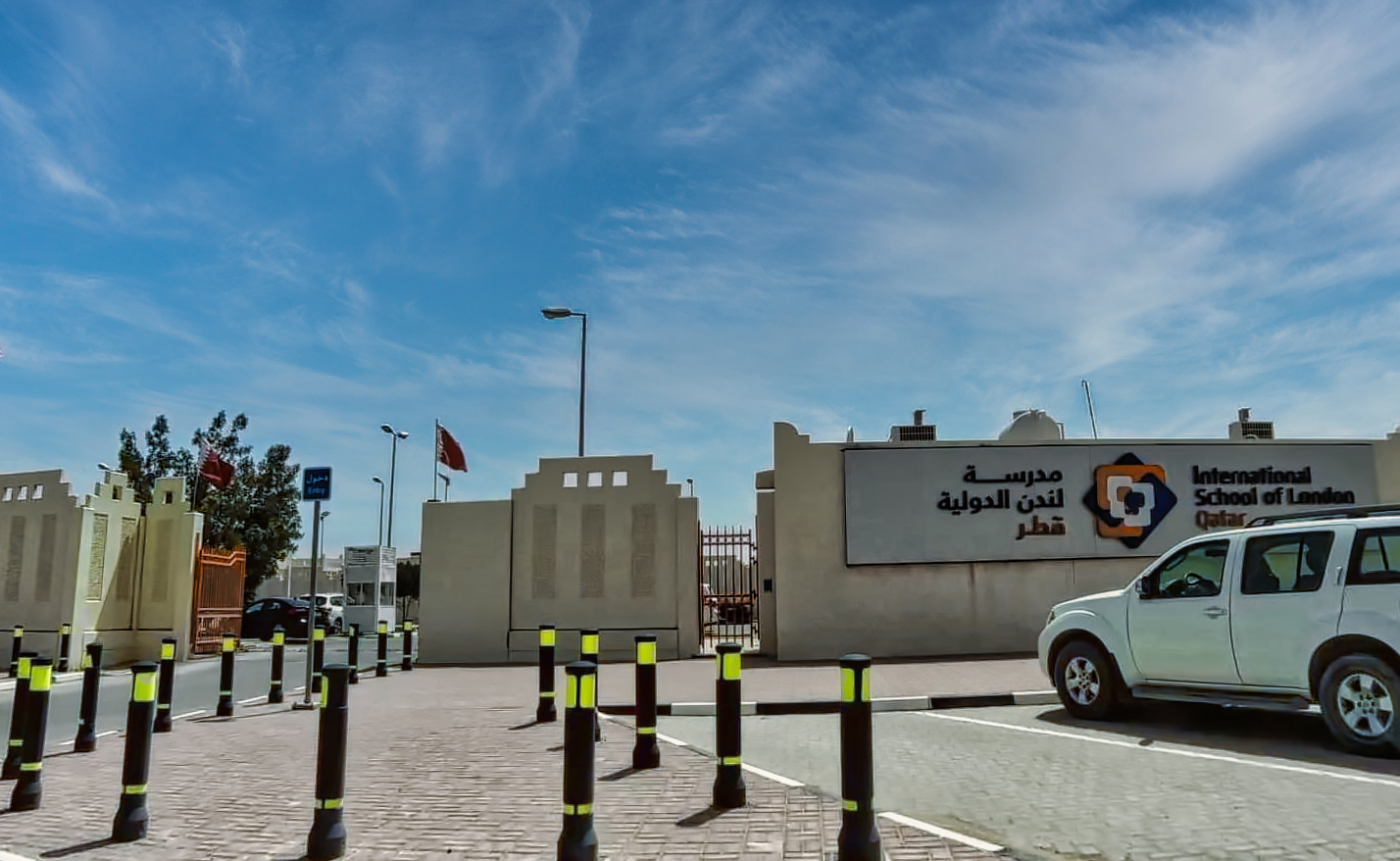
Entrance International School of London Qatar in Umm Salal Mohammed

A number of private international schools have a presence in Umm Salal Mohammed, such as the Royal Grammar School, Guildford, which opened to students in September 2016, in addition to the Qatar Finland International School and the International School of London Qatar.

Name of School	Curriculum	Grade	Genders	Official Website	Ref
Royal Grammar School, Guildford	British	Kindergarten – Secondary	Both	Official website	
International School of London	IB	Kindergarten – Secondary	Both	Official website	
Qatar Finland International School	Finnish	Kindergarten – Primary	Both	Official website	
