= Saina Al-Humaidi =

Saina Al-Humaidi صنيع الحميدي
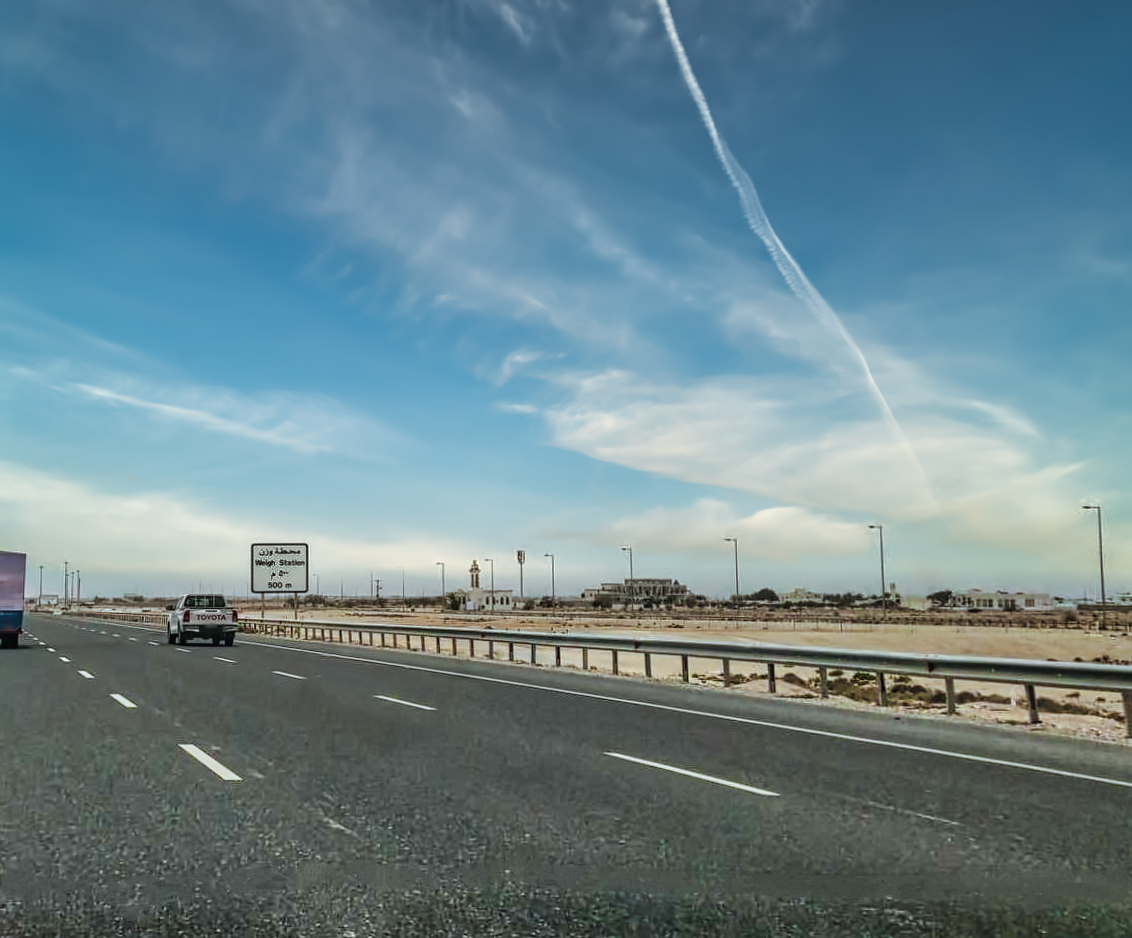
- View of Saina Al Humaidi from Al Shamal Road

- Location within Qatar
- Coordinates: 25°32′N 51°24′E
- Country: Qatar
- Municipality: Umm Salal
- Zone: Zone 71
- District no.: 133

Area
  - Total: 8.3 km^{2} (3.2 sq mi)

Saina Al-Humaidi (Arabic: صنيع الحميدي; also spelled Snay Lehmaidi) is a Qatari village in the municipality of Umm Salal. The village has been inhabited primarily by the Al-Humaidi tribe for decades.

== Etymology ==
In Arabic, sana is a term used to denote an area where water accumulates. The term may also refer to the type of wood used in a barrier enclosing a water reservoir.

== Infrastructure ==
The village has only 15 housing units, all owned by the Al-Humaidi. There is a mosque in the area, called "Smra Bin Muawiya". The village is typified by poor sanitation and a lack of facilities. Resident typically travel to Umm Qarn, a village 2 km away, to purchase products.
