= Bu Fasseela =

Bu Fasseela بوفسيلة
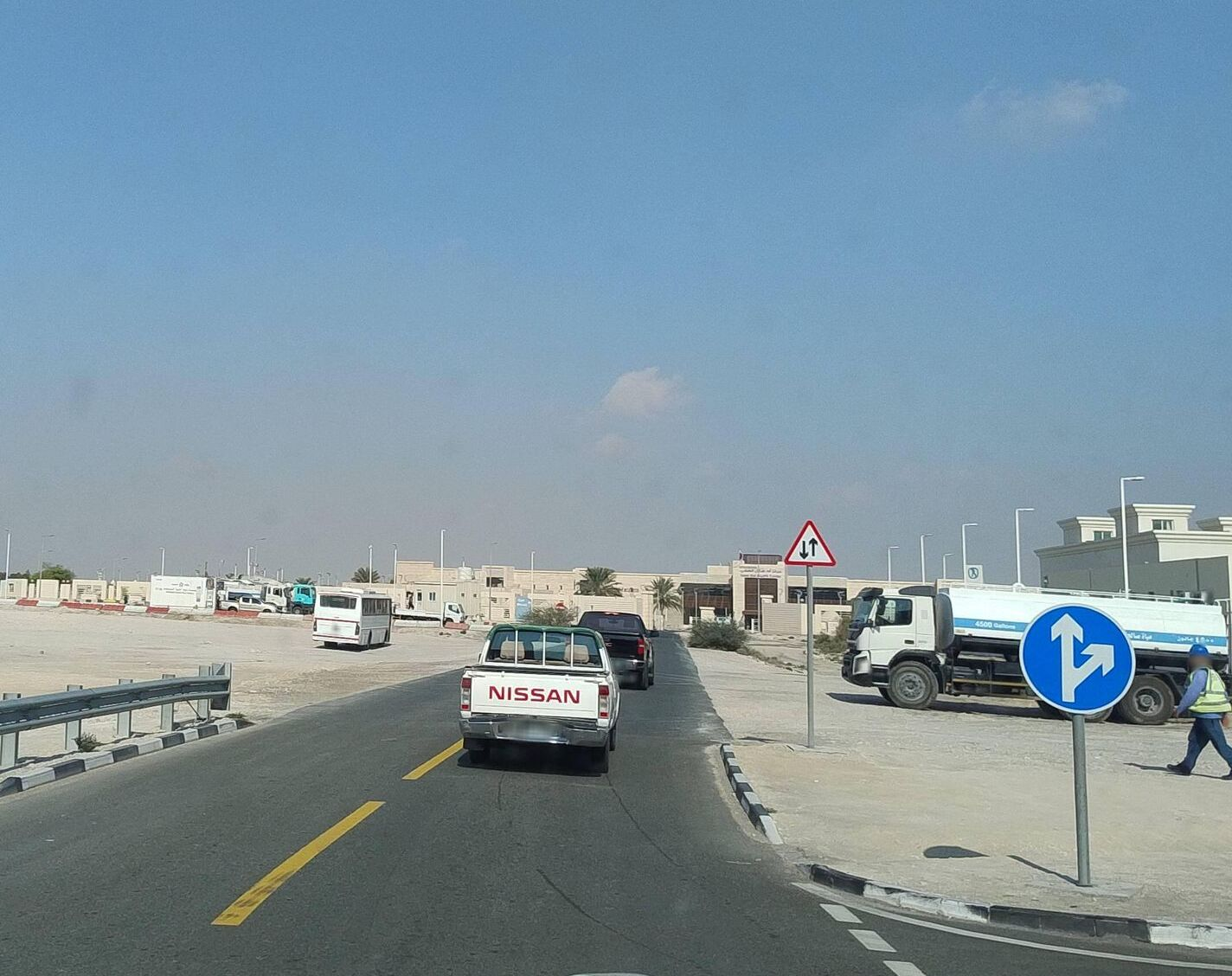
- View of Umm Salal Health Centre from Street 491

- Location within Qatar
- Coordinates: 25°26′26″N 51°24′19″E
- Country: Qatar
- Municipality: Umm Salal
- Zone: Zone 71
- District no.: 129

Area
  - Total: 6.8 km^{2} (2.6 sq mi)

Bu Fasseela (Arabic: بوفسيلة, romanized: Bū Fasīlah) is a village in the municipality of Umm Salal in Qatar.

== Etymology ==
Abu in Arabic translates to "father", while the word fasseela is a local term for "palm trees". The settlement derived its name from a prominent palm tree located within its confines.

== Infrastructure ==
Umm Salal Health Centre, occupying an area of over 50,000 square meters, is situated in the settlement. It opened in July 2016, after 2.5 years of construction, at a cost of QR 115 million. With the stated goal of serving a population of up to 50,000, the facility has 64 clinics, which is more than all other health care centers in Qatar.

Land in Abu Fasseela measuring over 190,000 square meters was disclosed as being earmarked for a major manufacturing project in 2017. Announced as "Abu Fasseela Logistics Hub", this area would be dedicated towards warehouse storage. Al Asmakh Real Estate Development Company was reported to be responsible for overseeing its development.
