= Umm Al Amad (Qatar) =

Umm Al Amad ام العمد
- Village
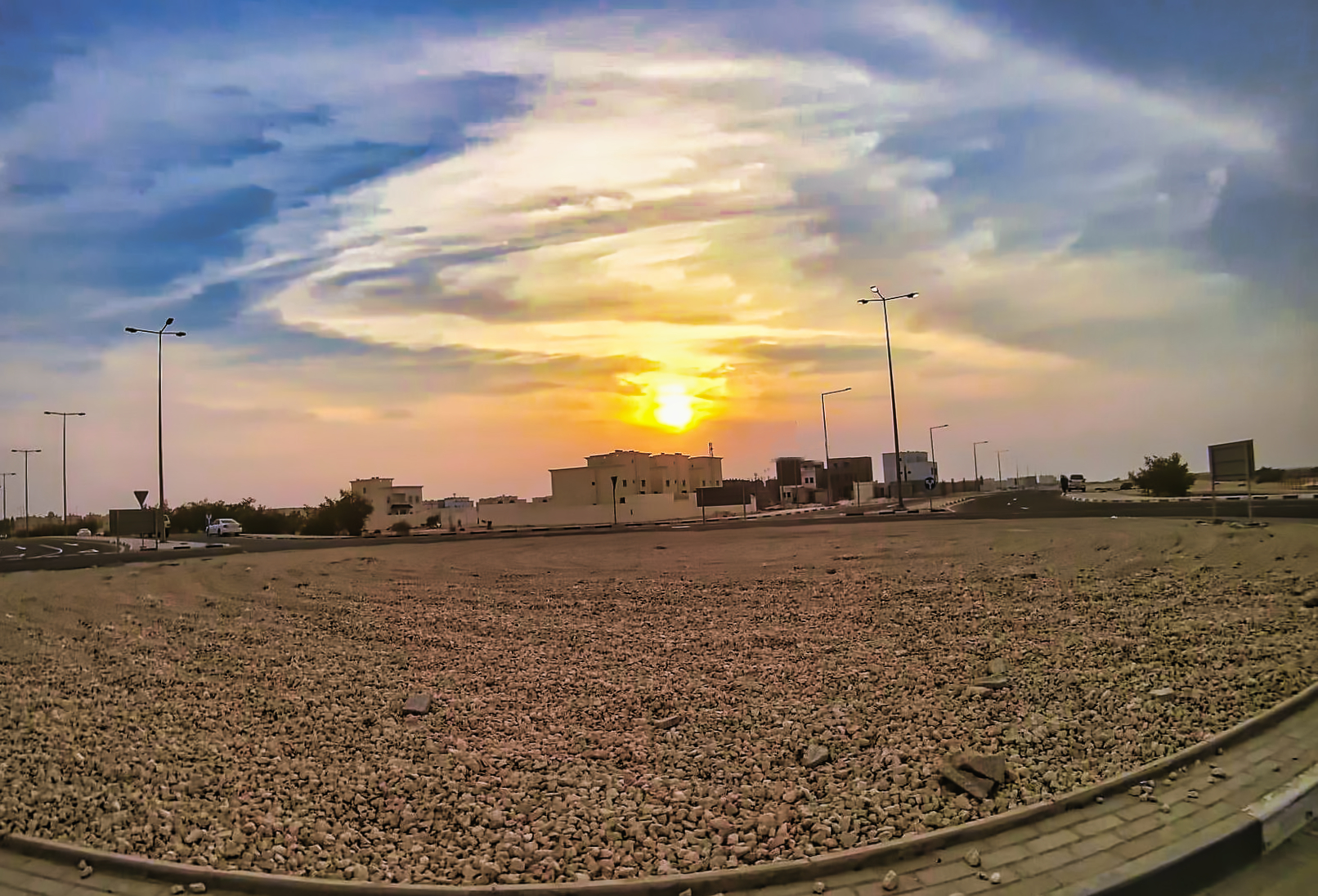
- View of Umm Al Amad from North Street

- Location within Qatar
- Coordinates: 25°29′32″N 51°24′1″E
- Country: Qatar
- Municipality: Umm Salal
- Zone: Zone 71
- District no.: 132

Area
  - Total: 15.8 km^{2} (6.1 sq mi)

Population (2024)
  - Total: 2,700
  - Density: 20/km^{2} (52/sq mi)
- Time zone: GMT+3

Umm Al Amad (Arabic: ام العمد) is a village in the municipality of Umm Salal in Qatar.

== Etymology ==
Umm in Arabic translates to "mother", whereas the term amad is used to describe a pillar or support structure for a building. It was so named because of its propensity of sidra and samr trees which were cut and used as a foundation for many of the houses constructed in the village.

== Geography ==
Situated to the immediate north of the village is Sunai, a 4 km square protected area. It was given legal protection to preserve its biodiversity and to prevent the negative effects of urbanization.

To the west of Sunai is Abal Najem. This area is a rawda (depression) which hosts a rich diversity of plants. In 2017, the Ministry of Municipality and Environment launched a rehabilitation campaign to help beautify and preserve the rawda. This campaign involved disposing of waste and planting native tree species, and was participated in by Ooredoo and Barzan Youth Center.

== Infrastructure ==
Umm Al Amad has seen rapid urban development since the 21st century, with large residential complexes being built in the village. One of the most notable features of the village is its plant nursery, which contains over 500 trees, shrubs and ornamentals, attracting customers from other parts of the country due to its relatively low prices.
