= Bani Hajer (Al Rayyan) =

Bani Hajer بني هاجر
- District
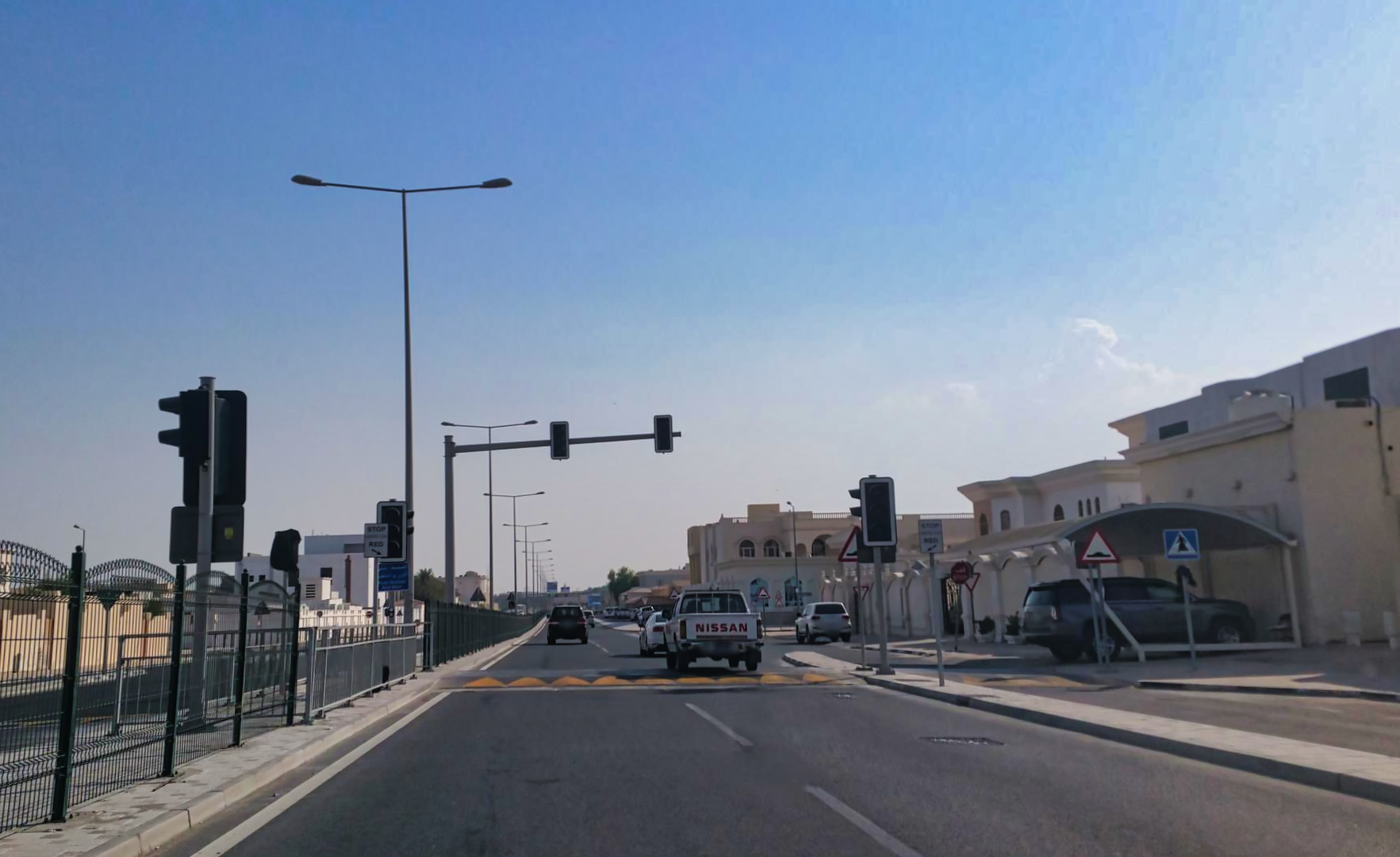
- Al Shahama Street in Bani Hajer

- Location within Qatar Location within Middle East Location within Asia
- Coordinates: 25.2367°N 51.4054°E
- Country: Qatar
- Municipality: Al Rayyan
- Zone: Zone 51
- District no.: 50

Area
  - Total: 2.7 km^{2} (1.0 sq mi)
- Elevation: 27 m (89 ft)

Bani Hajer (Arabic: بني هاجر) is a district in Qatar, located in the municipality of Al Rayyan and part of the Doha Metropolitan Area.

In the 2015 census, it was listed as a district of Zone 51, with a population of 56,027. It includes Izghawa, Gharrafat Al Rayyan, Al Gharrafa, Al Seej, Rawdat Egdaim and Al Themaid.

The district is 10 km (6.2 mi) away from central Doha. It is bordered to the north by Rawdat Egdaim.

== Etymology ==
The district is named after the Bani Hajer tribe. They historically inhabited the area, along with other Bedouin tribes such as the Al Murrah, Dawasir and Al Qahtani.

== Landmarks ==
- Fereej Bani Hajer Stadium (managed by Qatar Olympic Committee) on Al Athab Street.
- Bani Hajer Roundabout.

== Development ==
Ashghal (The Public Works Authority) launched a QR 322 million road and infrastructure project in Bani Hajer in 2015. One of the primary focuses of the project was the construction of paved roads in future housing areas. New roads linking existing neighborhoods to arterial roads and building additional roads into Rawdat Egdaim were also planned. In February 2018, the project was completed. According to Saoud Al Tamimi, Roads Projects Department Manager at Ashghal, the project resulted in a 60% reduction in time spent traveling in the district and helped integrate the roads into the national expressway network. Overall, 91 km (57 mi) of shared pedestrian and cycling paths, 1,937 light poles, 7,100 parking bays and over 20 km (12 mi) of road was constructed.

The most vital road constructed as part of the road and infrastructure project was Bani Hajer Interchange, which links westward Dukhan with Bani Hajer and Al Rayyan City. Four overpasses, two loops and two link bridges are included on this highway, the most heavily trafficked being the Bani Hajer Underpass which connects Bani Hajer's Al Shahama Street to Al Rayyan Al Jadeed Street in Al Rayyan City.

== Education ==
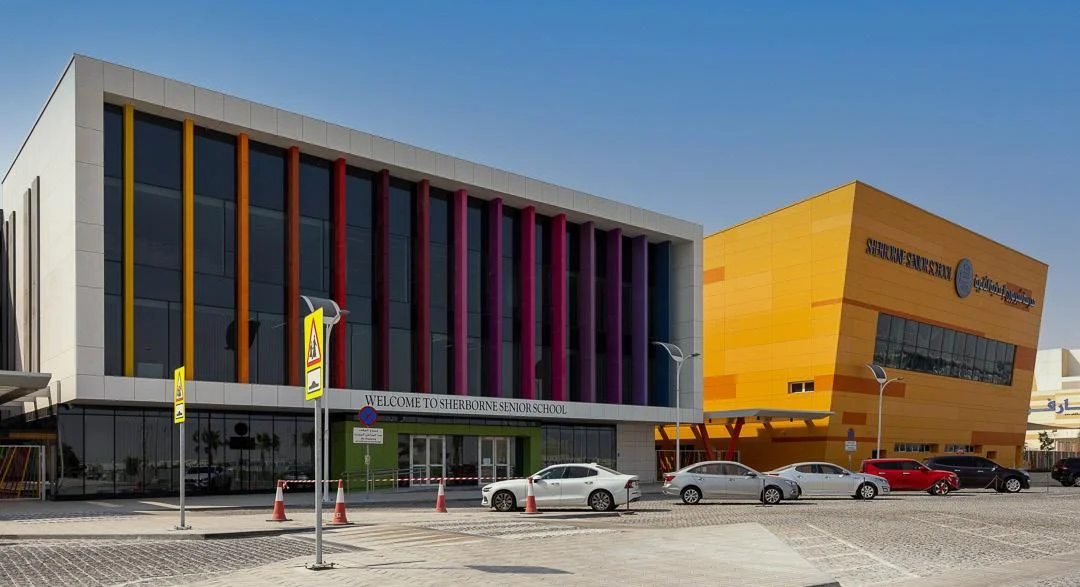
Sherborne Qatar Senior School

The following schools are in Bani Hajer:

Name of school	Curriculum	Grade	Genders	Ref
Al Manar Model School	Independent	Primary	Male-only	
Ali Bin Jassim Bin Mohammed Al Thani Secondary Boys	Independent	Secondary	Male-only	
Omamah Bint Hamzah Primary Independent Girls	Independent	Primary	Female-only	
Sherborne Qatar Preparatory School	British	Primary	Both	
Sherborne Qatar Senior School	British	Secondary	Both	
