= Al Themaid =

Al Themaid الثميد
- District
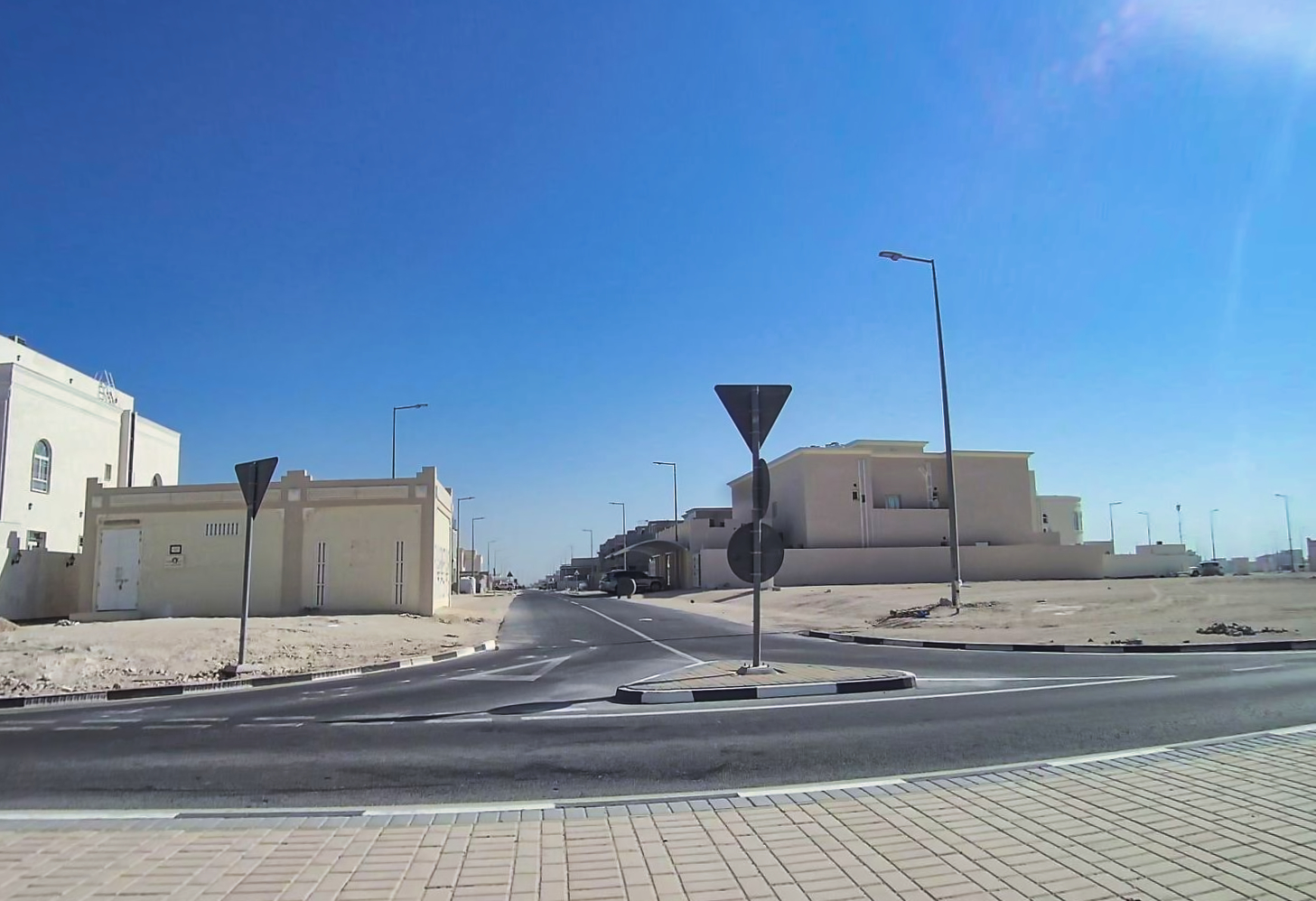
- Street 1507 in Al Themaid

- Location within Qatar
- Coordinates: 25.35383°N 51.377567°E
- Country: Qatar
- Municipality: Al Rayyan
- Zone: Zone 51
- District no.: 53

Area
  - Total: 7.4 km^{2} (2.9 sq mi)
- Elevation: 32 m (105 ft)

Al Themaid (Arabic: الثميد, romanized: Ath Thumayd; also spelled Al Thumaid) is a district in Qatar, located in the municipality of Al Rayyan.

In the 2015 census, it was listed as a district of zone no. 51 with a population of 56,027. It also includes Izghawa, Gharrafat Al Rayyan, Al Gharrafa, Rawdat Egdaim, Bani Hajer and Al Seej.

It borders Rawdat Egdaim to the south and south-east, Izghawa 71 in Umm Salal Municipality to the east, Al Froosh in Umm Salal Municipality to the north, and Rawdat Al Jahhaniya to the west.

== Etymology ==
An Arabic term, thumaid roughly translates to "shallow area that holds water". This name was given in recognition of a shallow well found here. This historic well is found in the district's southern portion in a rawda (depression).

== History ==
Until the district's development in the 1960s, it was a popular hunting area for local falconry enthusiasts.
