= Rawdat Al Jahhaniya =

Rawdat Al Jahhaniya روضة الجهانية
- District
- Location within Qatar
- Coordinates: 25.339838°N 51.354994°E
- Country: Qatar
- Municipality: Al Rayyan
- Zone: Zone 51
- District no.: 56

Area
  - Total: 3.35 km^{2} (1.29 sq mi)
- Elevation: 32 m (105 ft)

Rawdat Al Jahhaniya, also known as Al Riffa (Arabic: روضة الجهانية, romanized: Rawḑat al Jahānīyah) is a district in Qatar, located in the municipality of Al Rayyan. It is accessible through Dukhan Highway by road and Al Riffa station by rail. The district is one of the areas in Qatar which allows freehold ownership by foreigners.

It is bordered to the east by the districts of Al Seej, Al Themaid, and Rawdat Egdaim, to the north by Jeryan Al Saham, to the west and north-west by Jery Al Dabi, and to the south by Umm Al Jawashen. The Mall of Qatar is located here.

== Etymology ==
In Arabic, rawdat refers to a depression where rainfall runoff accumulates. The second part of the name, "Jahanniya", is derived from Juhaynah, the name of a tribe which historically occupied the area.

== Developments ==
The formerly undeveloped area was chosen as the site to build a new commercial and sports hub for Al Rayyan west of Sports City in Baaya. Aside from the Mall of Qatar, which constitutes Qatar's largest shopping mall, and the new Al Rayyan Stadium, the area is expected to host several sports fields, a hospital, a metro station, a large park and a wedding hall.

== Transport ==
The elevated Al Riffa station currently serves as the western terminus the Green Line of the Doha Metro. The station was opened to the public on 10 December 2019 along with the other Green Line stations. It is located on Dukhan Highway, opposite of the Mall of Qatar.

The station currently has no metrolinks. Facilities on the premises include restrooms and a prayer room.

== Gallery ==
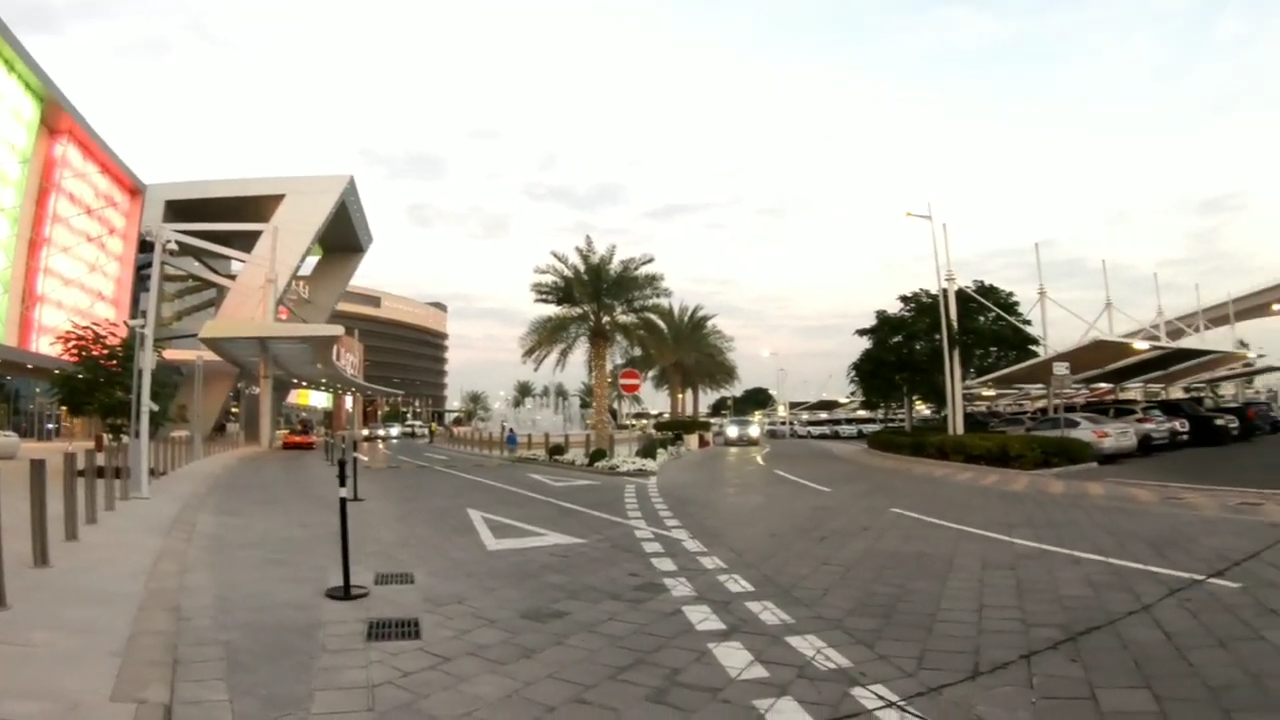
Mall of Qatar front entrance and parking lot.

The under-construction Al Rayyan Stadium in 2019. It was used as a venue for the 2022 FIFA World Cup.
