= Al Seej =

Al Seej السيج
- District
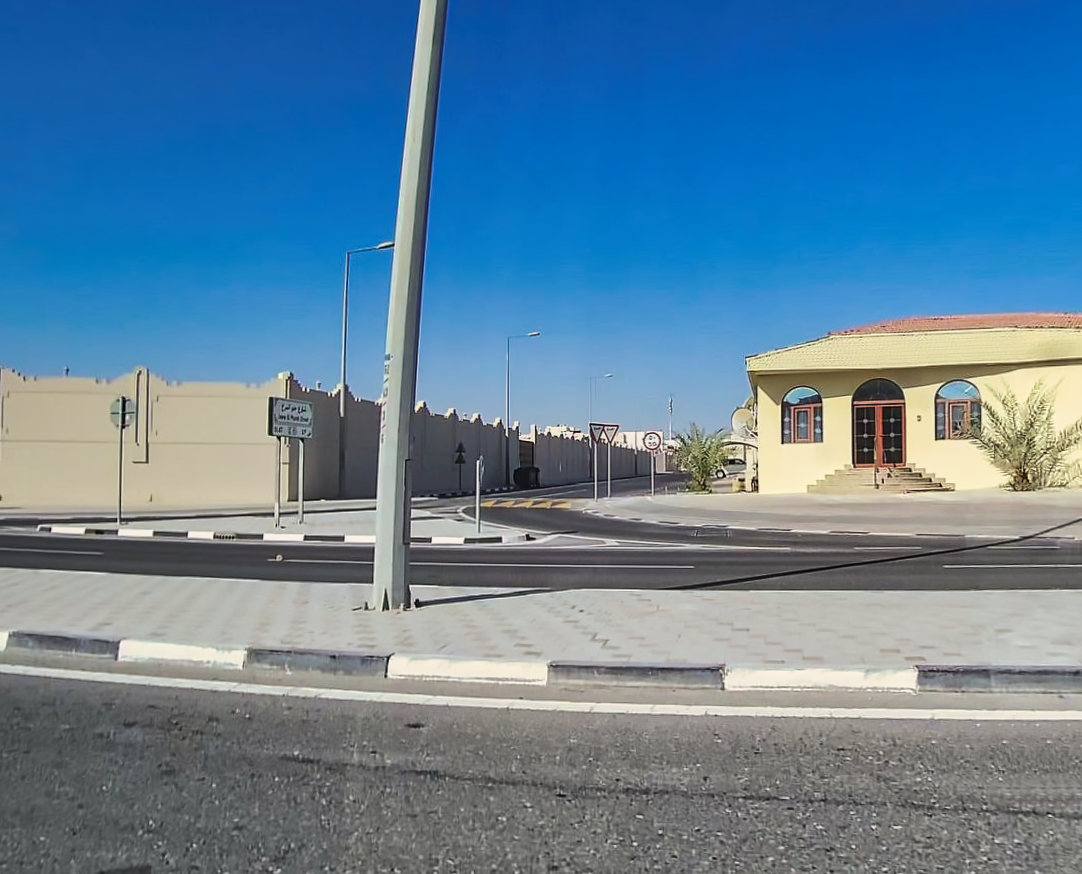
- Jaww Al Markh Street in Al Seej

- Location within Qatar
- Coordinates: 25.321845°N 51.374191°E
- Country: Qatar
- Municipality: Al Rayyan
- Zone: Zone 51
- District no.: 52

Area
  - Total: 5.8 km^{2} (2.2 sq mi)
- Elevation: 37 m (121 ft)

Al Seej (Arabic: السيج, romanized: As Sīq; also spelled Al Seeq) is a district in Qatar, located in the municipality of Al Rayyan.

In the 2015 census, it was listed as a district of Zone 51 which has a population of 56,027 and also includes Izghawa, Gharrafat Al Rayyan, Al Gharrafa, Rawdat Egdaim, Bani Hajer and Al Themaid.

It borders Bani Hajer to the east, Al Wajbah to the south, Rawdat Al Jahanniya to the west, and Rawdat Egdaim to the north.

== Etymology ==
The district's name has its origins in the Arabic word saq, which refers to a tree trunk. As the area is situated in a rawda (depression), it accommodated various flora, among which Ziziphus nummularia, locally known as sidr, was most valued because of the use of its trunks as building material.
