= Rawdat Egdaim =

Rawdat Egdaim روضة اقديم
- District
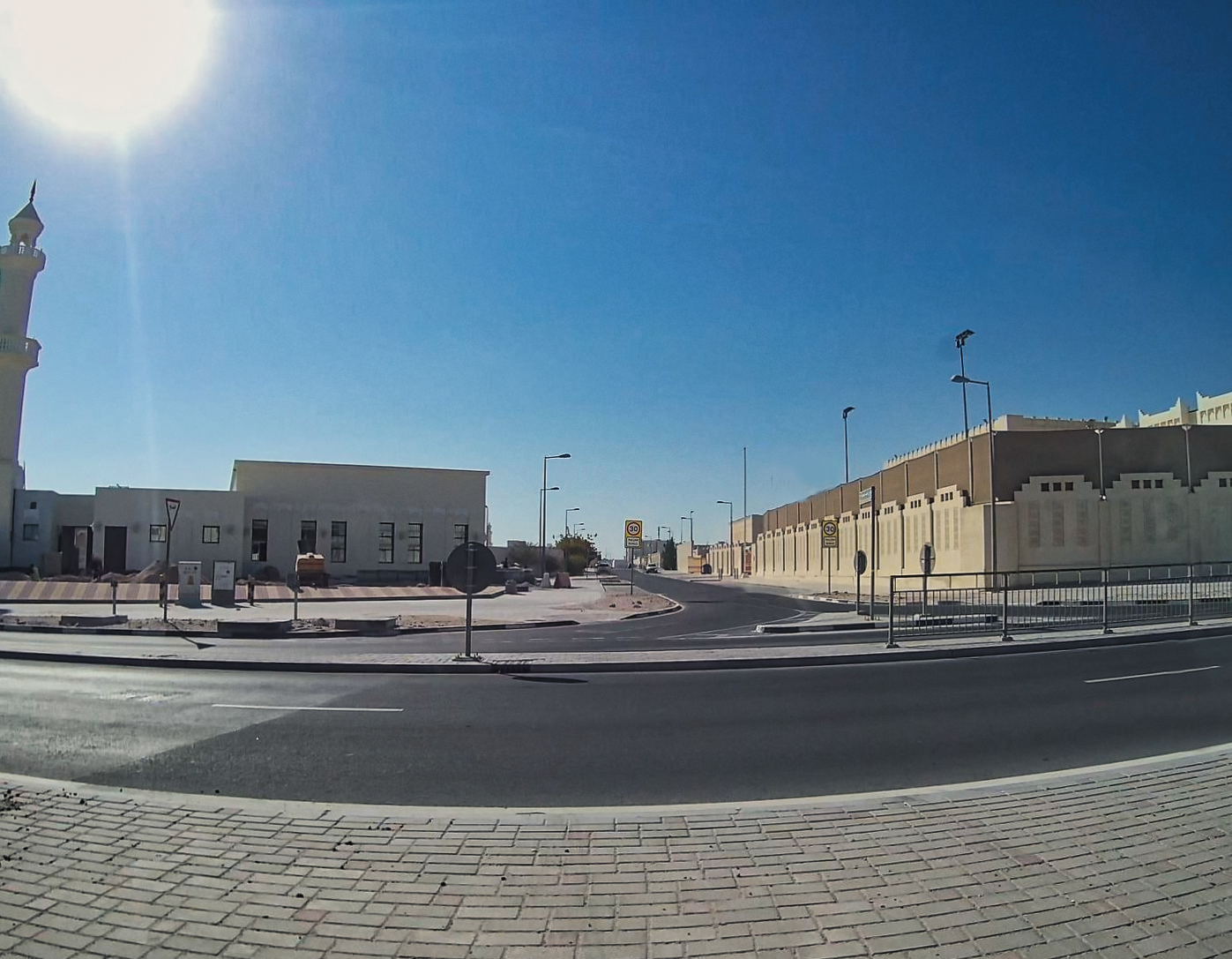
- Thaghab Al Mayeda Street in Rawdat Egdaim

- Location within Qatar
- Coordinates (Rawdat Egdaim Market): 25.3307°N 51.3803°E
- Country: Qatar
- Municipality: Al Rayyan
- Zone: Zone 51
- District no.: 51

Area
  - Total: 12.7 km^{2} (4.9 sq mi)
- Elevation: 33 m (108 ft)

Rawdat Egdaim (Arabic: روضة اقديم; also spelled Rawdat Ekdaim) is a district in Qatar, located in the municipality of Al Rayyan.

In the 2015 census it was listed as a district of Zone 51, with a population of 56,027. It includes Izghawa, Gharrafat Al Rayyan, Al Gharrafa, Al Seej, Bani Hajer and Al Themaid.

It is bordered to the south by Bani Hajer and to the east by Gharrafat Al Rayyan. To the north is Umm Salal Municipality.

== Etymology ==
The first word of the district's name has its roots in the Arabic term rawda, which means "a fertile depression that is usually rich in vegetation". Typically, these depressions are excellent sites for grazing livestock. Egdaim, the second part of the name, is an alternate spelling of aqdaim, which itself originates from qadam, the Arabic word for "foot". This name was bestowed on the area because the rawda has a foot-like shape.
