= Zone 51, Qatar =

Zone 51
- Zone
- Interactive map of Zone 51
- Coordinates: 25.346092°N 51.364398°E
- Country: Qatar
- Municipality: Al Rayyan
- Blocks: 244

Area
  - Total: 80.9 km^{2} (31.2 sq mi)

Population
  - Total: 56,027 (2,015)
- Time zone: UTC+03 (Arabia Standard Time)
- ISO 3166 code: QA-RA

Zone 51 is a zone of the municipality of Al Rayyan in Qatar. The main districts recorded in the 2015 population census were Al Gharrafa, Gharrafat Al Rayyan, Izghawa, Bani Hajer, Al Seej, Rawdat Egdaim, and Al Themaid.

Other districts which fall within its administrative boundaries are Rawdat Al Jahhaniya and Umm Al Afaei.

== Demographics ==
| Year | Population |
|---|---|
| 1986 | 964 |
| 1997 | 484 |
| 2004 | 558 |
| 2010 | 771 |
| 2015 | 1,727 |

== Land use ==
The Ministry of Municipality and Environment's breakdown of land use in the zone is as follows.

| Area (km^{2}) | Developed land (km^{2}) | Undeveloped land (km^{2}) | Residential (km^{2}) | Commercial/ Industrial (km^{2}) | Education/ Health (km^{2}) | Farming/ Green areas (km^{2}) | Other uses (km^{2}) |
|---|---|---|---|---|---|---|---|
| 80.94 | 48.36 | 32.58 | 10.30 | 2.95 | 3.37 | 3.99 | 27.75 |
