= Landmark Mall Doha =

Shopping Mall in Qatar

Landmark Mall
- Location: Al Gharrafa, Al Rayyan, Qatar
- Coordinates: 25.3342°N 51.4661°E
- Opened: 2000
- Developer: Business Trading Company
- Owner: Abdul Aziz Mohammed Al Rabban
- Floor area: 58,000 m^{2} (620,000 sq ft)
- Floors: 3
- Website: landmarkdoha.com

Landmark Mall is a shopping mall located in Al Gharrafa, west of Doha, Qatar along Al Shamal road. Developed by the Business Trading Company (BTC), the mall officially opened in 2000, making it one of the earliest modern malls in Qatar. BTC, co-chaired by Abdul Aziz Mohammed Al Rabban and with Sheikh Abdul Aziz bin Nasser al‑Thani serving as deputy chairman, oversaw its development.

== History ==
Landmark Mall was conceived in the late 1990s during Qatar’s first wave of modern retail development. It officially opened in 2000 with around 30,000 m² of retail space, making it one of the earliest large-scale shopping centres in Doha.

The mall was designed with inspiration from traditional Qatari castles, featuring stylized turrets and a fort-like façade.

- 2000 – Official opening with 30,000 m² of space.
- 2005 – First expansion added 10,000 m².
- 2007–2008 – Second expansion added 18,000 m², bringing the total to 58,000 m². This also introduced more fashion outlets, and expanded Circus Land.

In the 2000s, Landmark Mall played a pioneering role in promoting mall culture in Qatar, particularly as a family-oriented destination with children’s amusement facilities and casual dining.

During the 2010s, the mall made headlines for regulatory issues:

- In 2012, municipal authorities temporarily closed Carrefour’s meat section inside the mall due to health violations.
- In 2015, the Ministry of Economy and Commerce fined several shops for misleading discount campaigns.

== Development ==
Originally covering around 30,000 m², Landmark Mall underwent two major expansions—adding about 10,000 m² in 2005 and another 18,000 m² in 2007–2008—bringing it to a total of approximately 58,000 m². The mall houses around 200 retail outlets, including high-end brands, specialty shops, and anchor tenants like Carrefour hypermarket.

== Architecture ==
The mall's design is influenced by traditional Qatari architecture and includes castle-like towers and ornamentation. The interior has wide corridors and natural lighting. The corridors are wide and naturally lit.

== Features ==
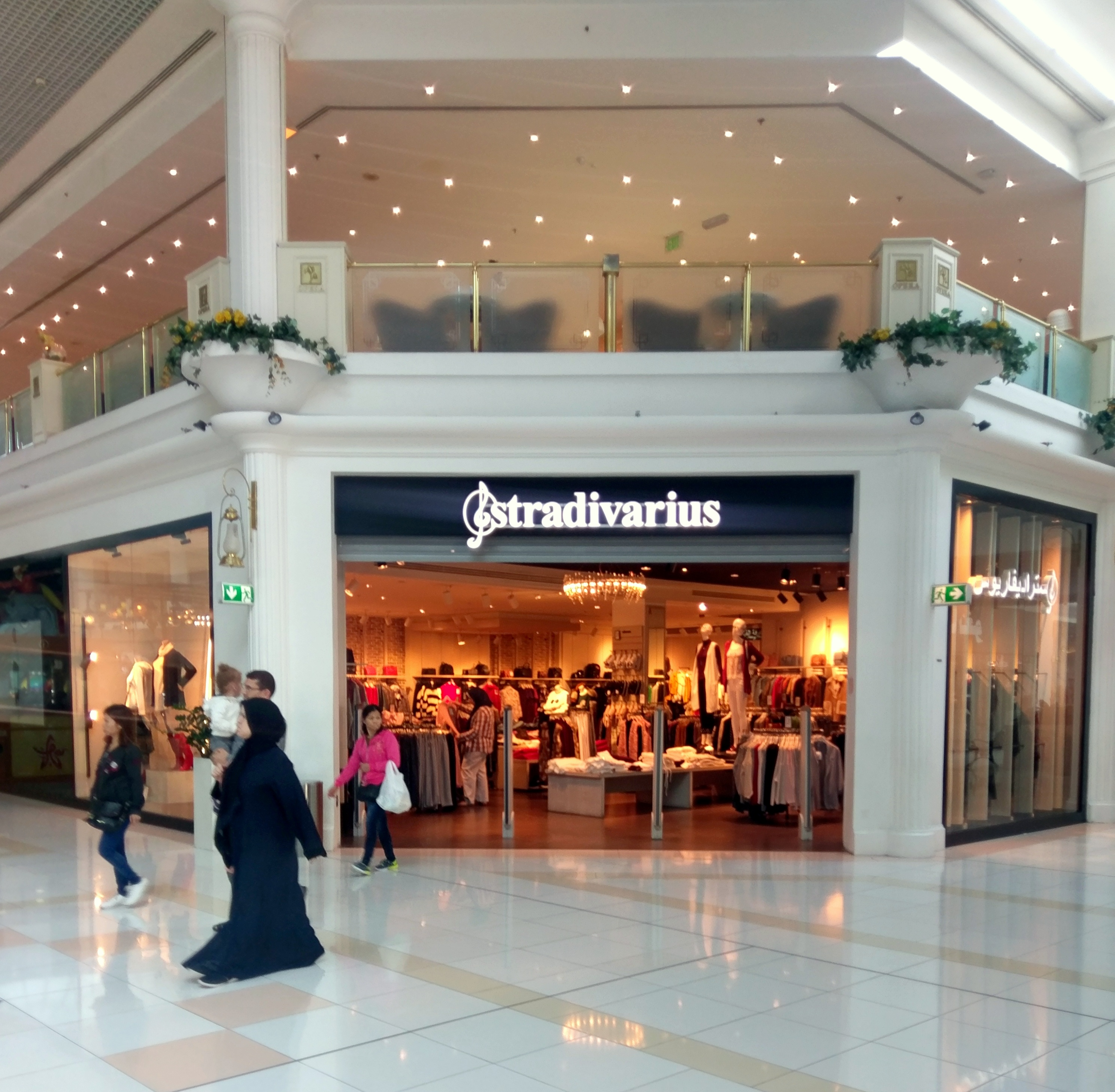
Stradivarius store at the mall

Landmark Mall hosts a variety of stores:

=== Retail ===
Landmark Mall hosts around 200 outlets, including international fashion brands such as Zara, H&M, Mango, Prada, Dolce & Gabbana, Marks & Spencer, and Swarovski. Anchor tenants include a large Carrefour hypermarket.

=== Dining ===
The mall features a food court and a mix of casual and upscale restaurants. International chains such as Starbucks, McDonald's, KFC, Subway, and TGI Fridays are complemented by regional cafés and bakeries such as Paul and Simit Sarayı.

=== Services ===
The mall provides family-friendly facilities including prayer rooms, ATMs, free Wi-Fi, beauty salons, and more than 1,800 parking spaces.

=== Circus Land ===
Circus Land is designed like a circus and a fair, including a horse carousel, a red baron airplane flyover, an inflatable slide, trampoline beds, bumper cars and four-story soft play area form the main attractions at Circus Land, which has a separate food court area and various kid shopping options.

== See also ==
- Villaggio Mall
- Mall of Qatar
- Doha Festival City
