= Umm Al Afaei =

Umm Al Afaei أم الأفاعي
- District
- Location within Qatar
- Coordinates: 25.3500°N 51.3333°E
- Country: Qatar
- Municipality: Al Rayyan
- Zone: Zone 51
- District no.: 59

Area
  - Total: 6.7 km^{2} (2.6 sq mi)

Umm Al Afaei (Arabic: أم الأفاعي) is a rural district in Qatar, located in the municipality of Al Rayyan.

The districts of Umm Leghab and Lehsiniya in Al-Shahaniya Municipality are nearby to the west.

== Etymology ==
In Arabic, umm translates to "mother" and is used as a prefix for geographical features. The second word, afaei, translates to snakes. Since the area is located on a rawda (depression), it used to be infested with snakes, hence the name.
