= Al Kharaitiyat =

Al Kharaitiyat الخريطيات
- Town
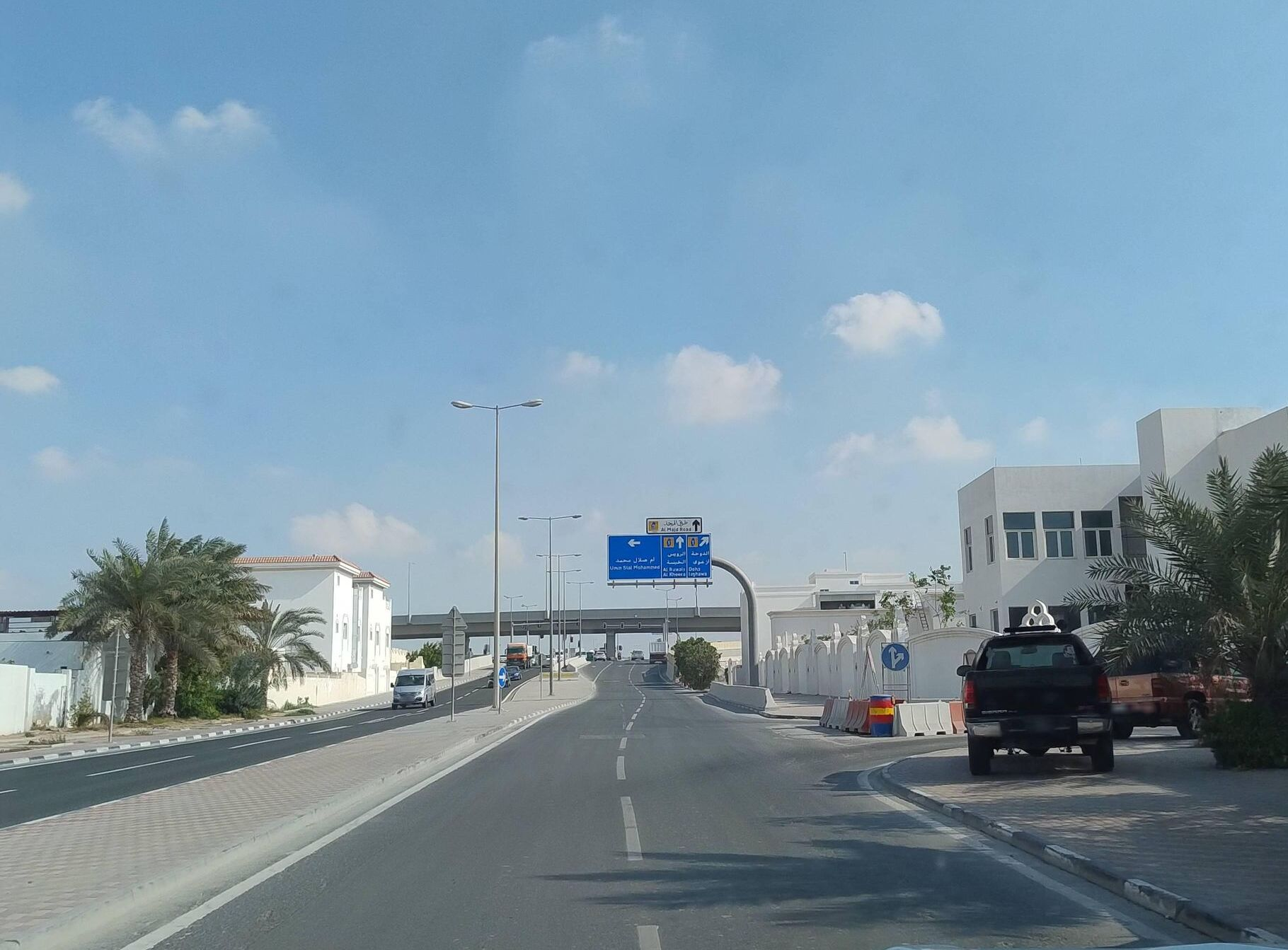
- Al Kheesa Road in Al Kharaitiyat

- Location within Qatar
- Coordinates: 25°24′0″N 51°25′30″E
- Country: Qatar
- Municipality: Umm Salal
- Zone: Zone 71
- District no.: 127

Area
  - Total: 15.7 km^{2} (6.1 sq mi)

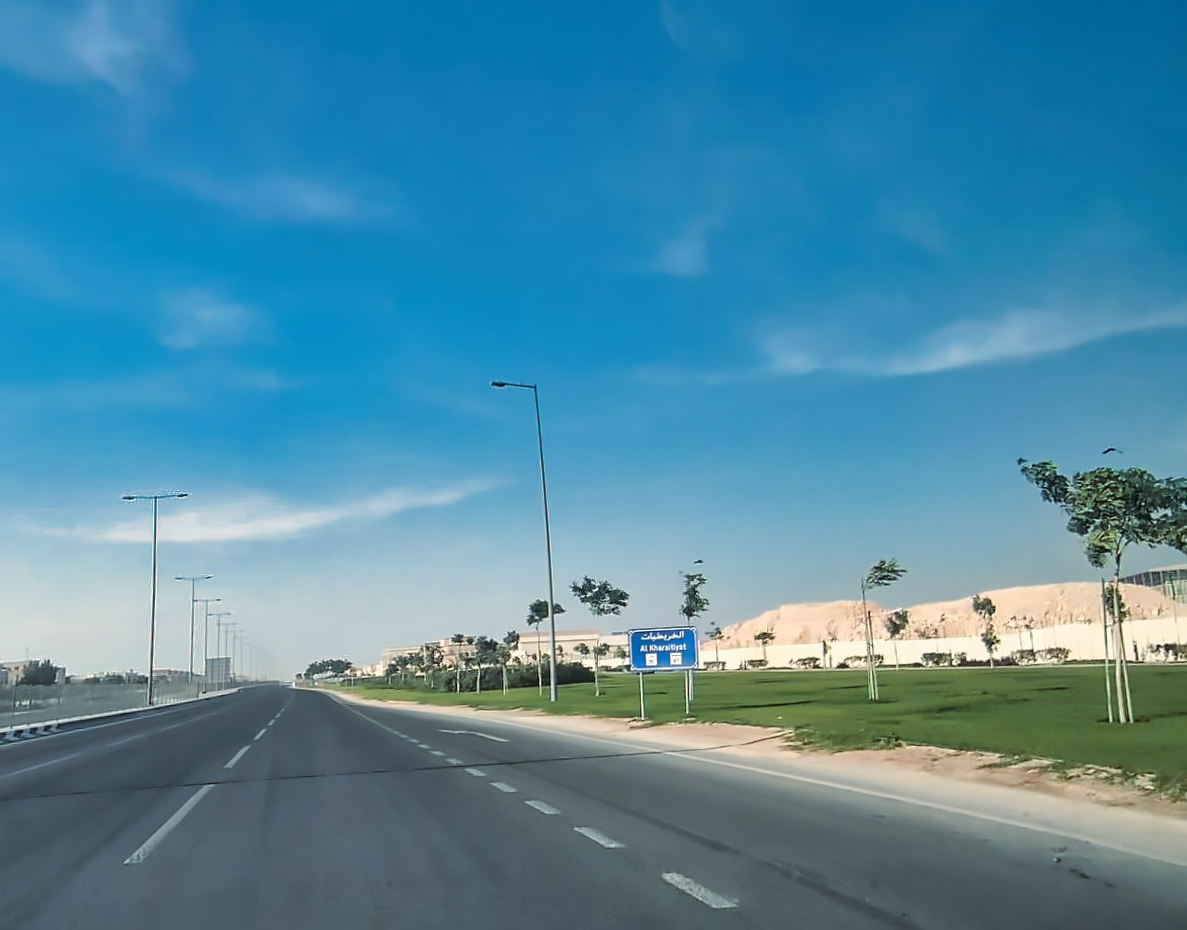
Sign for Al Kharaitiyat on New Al Hateem Street.

Al Kharaitiyat (Arabic: الخريطيات, romanized: Al Khurayţīyāt) is a town in the municipality of Umm Salal in Qatar.

== Etymology ==
Kharaitiyat is the plural form of the Arabic term khurat, which roughly translates to "map-like". The town received its name from a nearby depression that was named for its uneven and winding terrain, presenting a map-like appearance.

== History ==
In February 2025, the Public Works Authority (Ashghal) completed the first phase of its Roads and Infrastructure Development Project in Al Kharaitiyat and Al Froosh. The works served about 411 residential plots through the construction of 17.8 kilometres (11.1 mi) of roads, new drainage and water networks, and 655 street lighting poles. Despite challenges posed by high groundwater levels and rocky soil, the project was completed with 80% of materials sourced locally under Ashghal's Ta'heel initiative.

== Landmarks ==
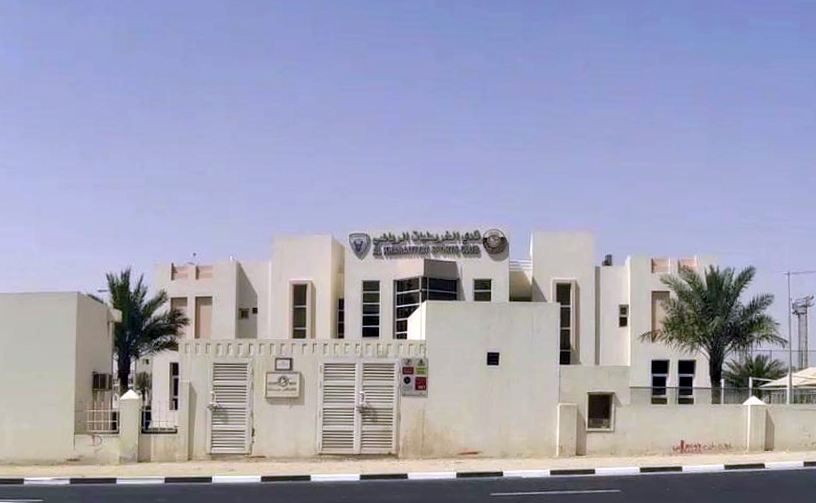
Al Kharaitiyat SC headquarters off Al Ebb Road in Al Kharaitiyat

- Al Kharaitiyat SC on Al Ebb Road.
- Al Kharaitiyat Family Park.
- Qatar Charity branch on Nasser Al Attiyah Street.
- Al Kharaitiyat Zakat Fund on Shu'ail bin Abdullah Al Attiyah Street.
- Q-Post branch on Shu'ail bin Abdullah Al Attiyah Street.

== Transport ==
Currently, the elevated Al Kharaitiyat Metro Station is under construction, having been launched during Phase 2A. Once completed, it will be part of Doha Metro's Green Line.

== Sports ==
Al Kharaitiyat is represented by the multi sportsclub Al Kharaitiyat SC.

== Central Municipal Council ==
When free elections of the Central Municipal Council first took place in Qatar during 1999, Al Kharaitiyat was designated as seat of constituency no. 23. It would remain seat of constituency no. 23 in the next three consecutive elections until the fifth municipal elections in 2015, when it was split between constituencies no. 15 and no. 17, with the former accommodating its southern section and the latter being seated by its northern section. Aside from featuring northern Al Kharaitiyat as its seat, constituency no. 17 also includes the districts of Al Froosh and northern Izghawa.

In the inaugural municipal elections of 1999, Abdullah Abdulrahman Al Mannai was declared the winner, receiving 26.7%, or 157 votes. Runner-up was Mubarak Mohammed Al-Hajri, receiving 23.2%, or 137 votes. Overall, voter turnout was 69.3%. The 2002 elections saw Fawaz Eid Daghash elected as constituency representative. For the third municipal elections in 2007, Ali Nasser Al-Kaabi was elected as representative. Al-Kaabi lost his seat to Hamad Hadi Al Marri in the 2011 elections. In the 2015 elections, in which Al Kharaitiyat was split between two constituencies, Ali Nasser Al-Kaabi was declared the representative of constituency no. 17, which had northern Al Kharaitiyat serving as its seat.

== Education ==
Name of School	Curriculum	Grade	Genders	Official Website	Ref
Al Obaib Primary Independent Girls School	Independent	Primary	Female-only	N/A	
Ibn Taymiyyah Boys Independent Secondary School	Independent	Secondary	Male-only	N/A	
Nasser Bin Abdulla Secondary Independent Boys School	Independent	Secondary	Male-only	N/A	
