= Qatar National Convention Centre =

Convention centre in Qatar

- مركز قطر الوطني للمؤتمرات

- Interactive map of Qatar National Convention Centre
- Address: Al Luqta Street, Al Rayyan, Qatar
- Location: Education City, Al Rayyan Municipality
- Coordinates: 25.322212°N 51.437708°E
- Owner: Qatar Foundation
- Operator: AMLAK Venues (Subsidiary of AMLAK Holding)

Construction
- Opened: December 2011
- Architect: Populous

Website
- www.qncc.qa

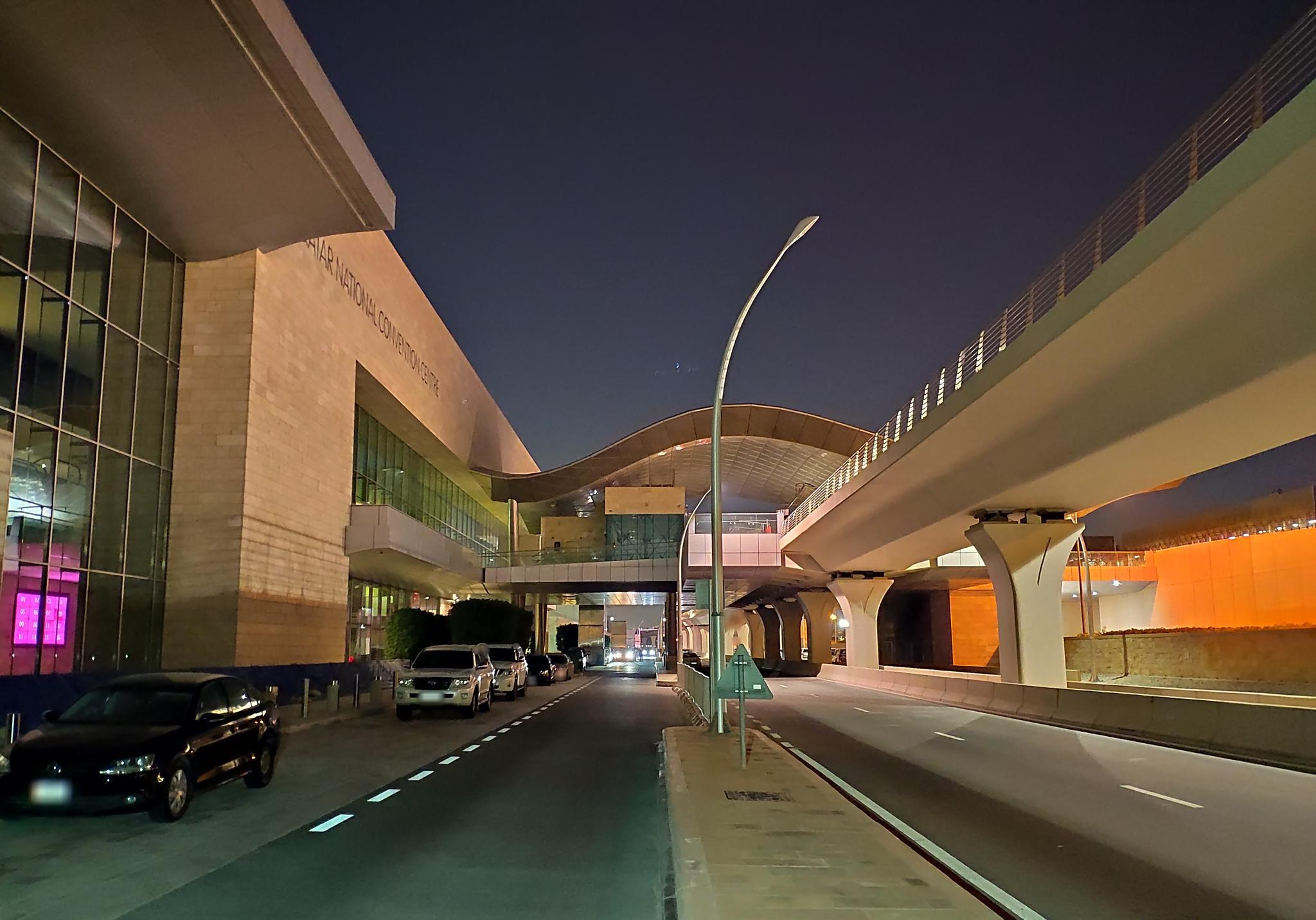
Street view of the centre

The Qatar National Convention Centre (QNCC) is located in the Gharrafat Al Rayyan district, on the Dukhan Highway in Al Rayyan, Qatar. The convention centre is a member of the Qatar Foundation for Education, Science and Community Development and is situated on Qatar Foundation’s 2,500-acre campus alongside the Sidra Medical and Research Center, Qatar Science & Technology Park, Weill Cornell Medical College in Qatar, Texas A&M, and Georgetown University, among others.

QNCC was officially opened on 4 December 2011. It was the first of its kind being built to the gold certification standard of the U.S. Green Building Council’s Leadership in Energy and Environment Design (LEED). Designed by Arata Isozaki in partnership with RHWL Architects, the building is designed to operate efficiently with innovations such as water conservation and energy-efficient fixtures, and it is approximately 32 percent more efficient compared with a similarly designed building that lack such innovations. One of the features is the 3,500 sqm of solar panels providing 12.5 percent of the Centre's energy needs. The exhibition halls are equipped with energy-efficient LED lighting. Many other integrative design elements were included in the building to achieve the highest level of environmental and sustainable standards. QNCC features a conference hall of 4,000 seats theatre style, a 2,300-seat theatre, three auditoria and a total of 52 flexible meetings rooms to accommodate a wide range of events. The columns at the front of the building to symbolise a Sidrat al-Muntaha, a sacred Islamic tree believed to mark the end of the seventh heaven in the Islamic religion. It has 200,000 square metres of venue area, which includes 40,000 square metres of exhibition space over nine halls, and is adaptable to seat 10,000 for a conference or banquet. It has held many concerts in the past, some notables include The Script, Ed Sheeran and OneRepublic.

In 2013, QNCC won the “Best Events Venue” at the Middle East Event Awards 2013. The Centre received “Middle East’s Leading Exhibition & Convention Centre” from World Travel Awards; “Best Congress and Convention Centre, Middle East” from Business Destinations Travel Awards (a vanity award); and “Best Convention Centre in Middle East” by MICE Report Awards in 2012.

Events held at the QNCC include the QITCOM 2014, the Qatar Foundation's Annual Research Conference 2014 (ARC’14) as well as the International Construction Technology and Building Materials Exhibition 2015. The second High Tech Port Fair, showcasing technology companies, and the 19th International Business Forum were held together at the QNCC in October 2015. In 2017, the centre hosted the GCC Majors Competition.

Over 1,000 student participated in the 10th Qatar National Robot Olympiad (NRO) which was held at the QNCC in March 2018.

In July 2019, the QNCC hosted “The Smurfs Live on Stage – Smurfs Save Spring” as well as “Hello Kitty Live Fashion & Friends“.

In 2022 the third Build your House exhibition was held. The DECC and the QNCC signed an agreement in February 2022 to promote Qatar as a business event hub.

In November 2023, the Qatar Leadership Conference (QLC) and the World Innovation Summit for Education was held at the QNCC.

The DIMDEX 2024 was held in March 2024 at the QNCC and featured 9 international pavilions as well as 200 companies.
