= Al Froosh =

Al Froosh الفروش
- Location within Qatar
- Coordinates: 25°24′19.8″N 51°23′22.3″E
- Country: Qatar
- Municipality: Umm Salal
- Zone: Zone 71
- District no.: 134

Area
  - Total: 11.4 km^{2} (4.4 sq mi)

Al Froosh (Arabic: الفروش, romanized: Al Furūsh; also spelled Al Furoush) is a village in the municipality of Umm Salal in Qatar. It is directly west of the town of Al Kharaitiyat and southwest of the town of Umm Salal Mohammed.

== Etymology ==
In Arabic, furoush means "mat". The area was given this name because it was matted by a thin layer of vegetation.

== Infrastructure ==
Starting in 2015, Ashghal has been carrying out a major infrastructure project in the village. In line with the project, Al Froosh is being jointly developed with Al Kharaitiyat over an area of 1.87 million square meters. Developments will include 420 housing units and an addition of 22.7 km (14.1 mi) of road and 17.4 km (10.8 mi) of sewage. The project had an estimated completion date of 2019.
