= Al Rayyan =

Municipality in Qatar

Al Rayyan الريان
- Municipality
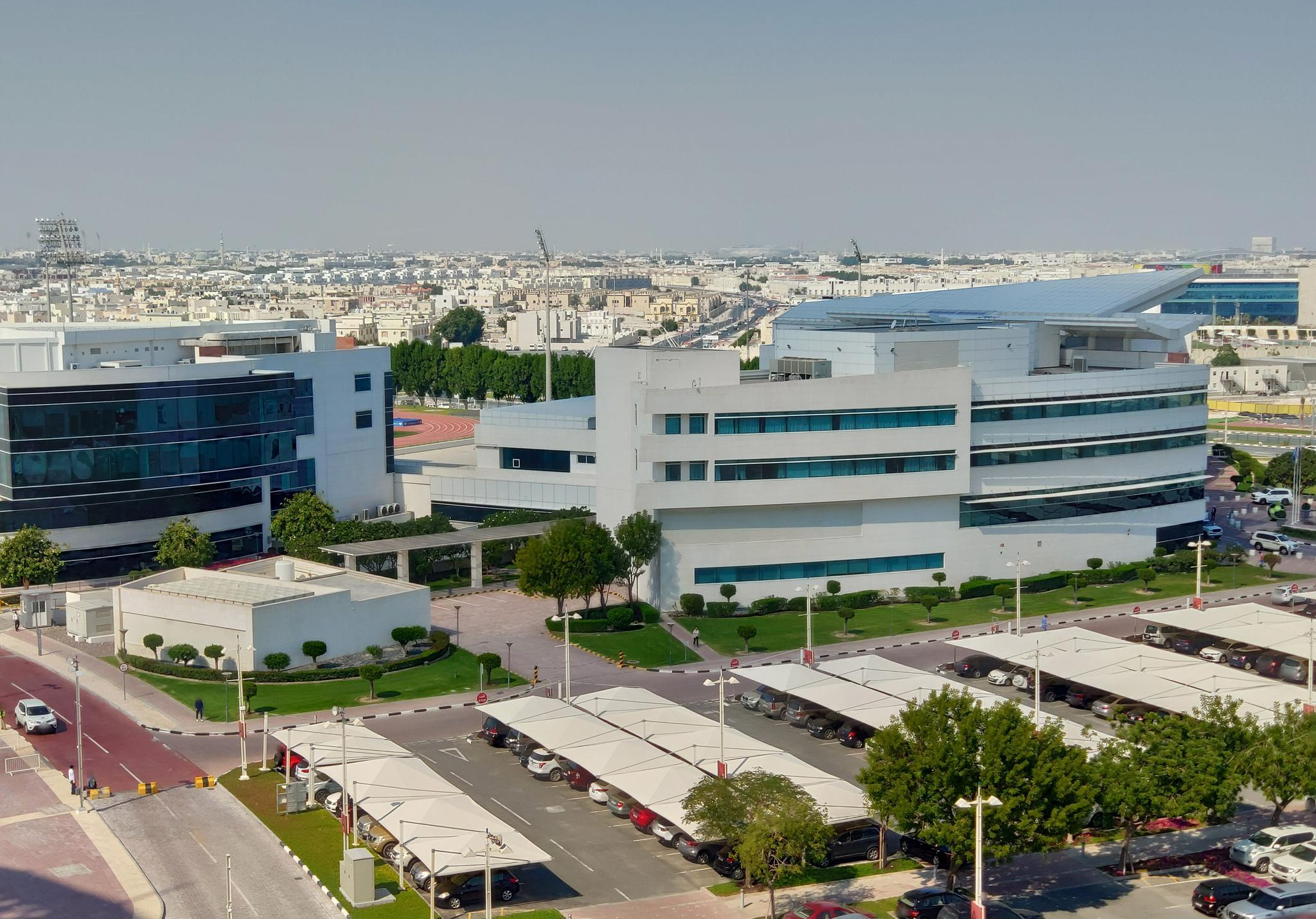

- Map of Qatar with Al Rayyan highlighted (from 2015 without Al-Shahaniya)
- Coordinates (Al Rayyan): 25.32°N 51.37°E
- Country: Qatar
- Capital: Al Rayyan City
- Zones: 10

Area
  - Total: 2,450 km^{2} (950 sq mi)

Population (2015)
  - Total: 605,712
  - Density: 247/km^{2} (640/sq mi)
- entire municipality
- Time zone: UTC+3 (AST)
- ISO 3166 code: QA-RA
- Website: Al Rayyan

Al Rayyan (Arabic: الريان; also spelled Ar Rayyan) is the third-largest municipality in Qatar. Its primary settlement is the city of the same name, which occupies the entire eastern section and is a part of the Doha Metropolitan Area. The vast expanse of mostly undeveloped lands in the south-west also falls under the municipality's administration.

== Etymology ==
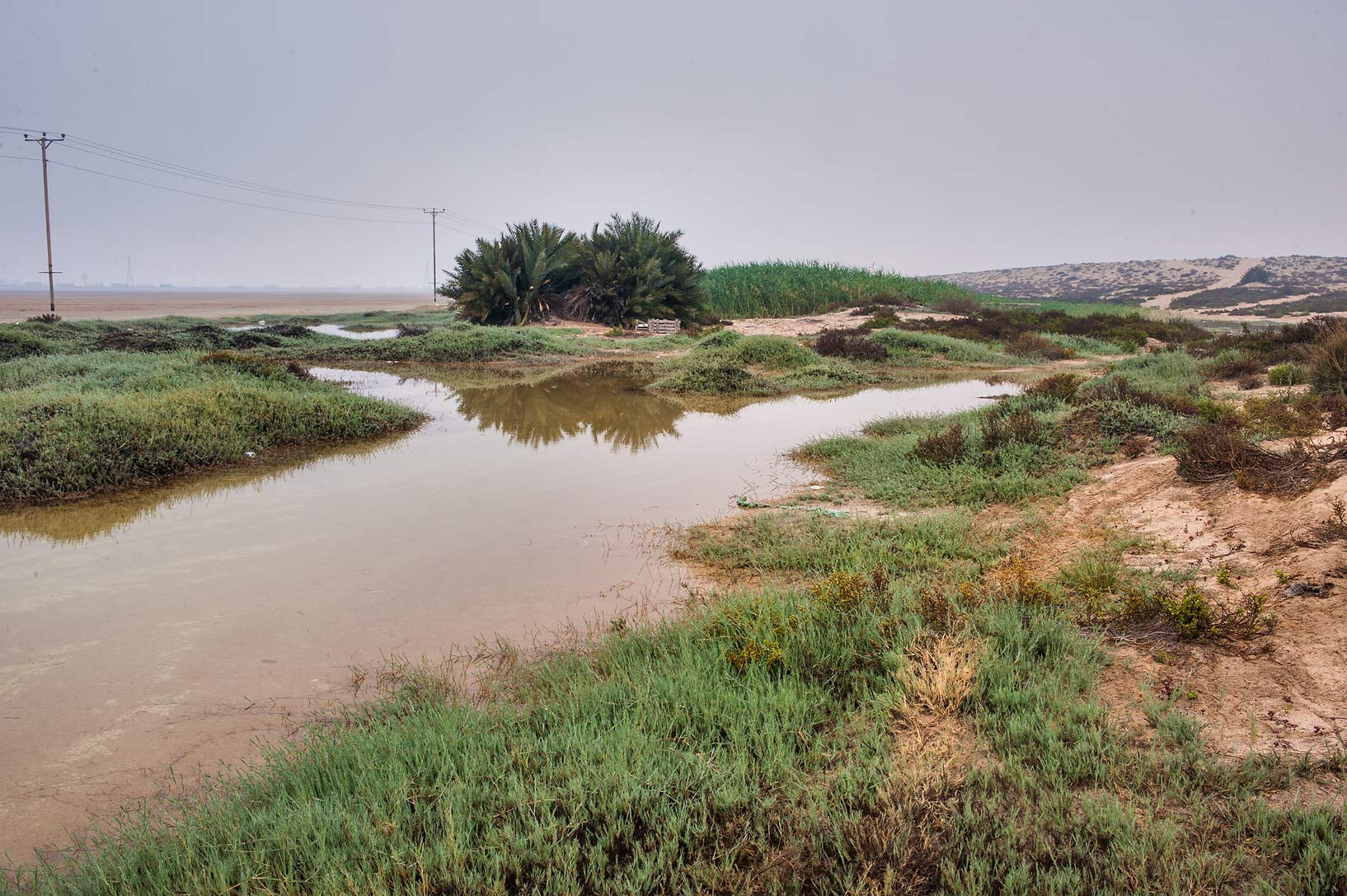
Natural spring of Qulmat Al Maszhabiya in Al Mashabiya Reserve, next to Abu Samra.

Similar to many other names given to Qatari settlements and municipalities, Al Rayyan Municipality was named after a geographic feature present in its namesake, the city of Al Rayyan. The city derives its name from the Arabic term ray, which translates to "irrigation". This name was bestowed upon it due to its low elevation, allowing it to act as a flood plain and provide a sustained supply of water to the numerous plants that grew within its boundaries.

== History ==
In March 1893, the Battle of Al Wajbah was fought between the Qataris and Ottomans at the recently built Al Wajbah Fort, located 16 km (10 mi) west of Old Doha. Although Qatar did not gain full independence from the Ottoman Empire, Qataris see the outcome of the battle as a defining moment in the establishment of Qatar as a modern state.

Al Rayyan Municipality was created as an independent municipal administration by the Ministry of Municipality and Urban Planning in 1972.

In 2004, Al Jemailiya Municipality was merged with Al Rayyan, and Jariyan Al Batnah Municipality was split between Al Rayyan and Al Wakrah Municipality. Doha Industrial Area, also known as Zone 58, was split off from Al Rayyan and integrated into Doha Municipality, becoming an exclave of Doha.

In 2014, the western city of Al-Shahaniya was dissociated from Al Rayyan Municipality to form its own municipality. Integrating approximately 35% of Al Rayyan's area into the new municipality, some of Al Rayyan's western localities such as Al Gharbiam, Al Utouriya, Al Jemailiya, Umm Bab, Rawdat Rashed, Al Nasraniya, Dukhan and Al Khurayb were also included in the new municipality.

== Geography ==
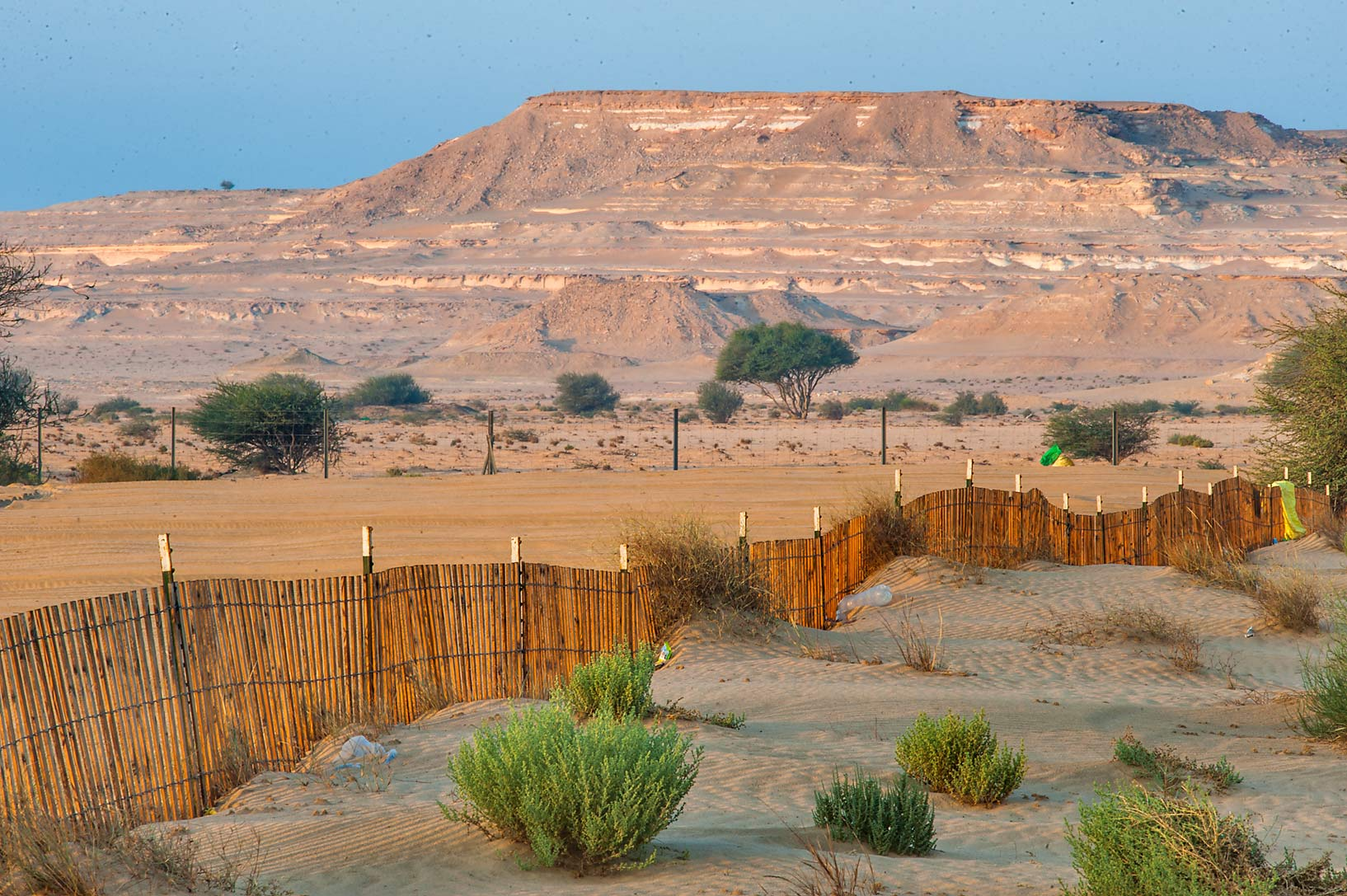
Fenced-off area of Jebel Nakhsh in southern Qatar.

Al Rayyan is bordered by four municipalities: Umm Salal to the northeast, Al-Shahaniya to the west, Doha to the east and Al Wakrah to the southeast. It is divided into two main sections; the west consisting of scattered rural settlements, farms and open desert, and the east comprising the city of Al Rayyan, an urban offshoot of Metropolitan Doha's westward growth.

According to the Ministry of Municipality and Environment (MME), the municipality has 223 depressions, 38 wadis, 24 streams, six plains, six sabkhas, six capes, and six bays. No islands exist off its coasts. The MME recorded 50 hills, including Jebel Nakhsh, which stands 90 meters tall. Furthermore, there is one highland in the municipality, called Alaa Jaow Al Mathlouth Al Janoubi which consists of elevated surface south of an elongated depression and its namesake, Jaow Al Mathlouth.

Al Gharrafa, which is a district of Al Rayyan City and also a part of metropolitan Doha, is being developed as a large-scale commercial hub for residents of northwest Doha, northern Al Rayyan and southern Umm Salal. The district is already a well-established retail center, hosting many major malls and supermarkets. Some residential developments are also planned for the district.

== Administration ==
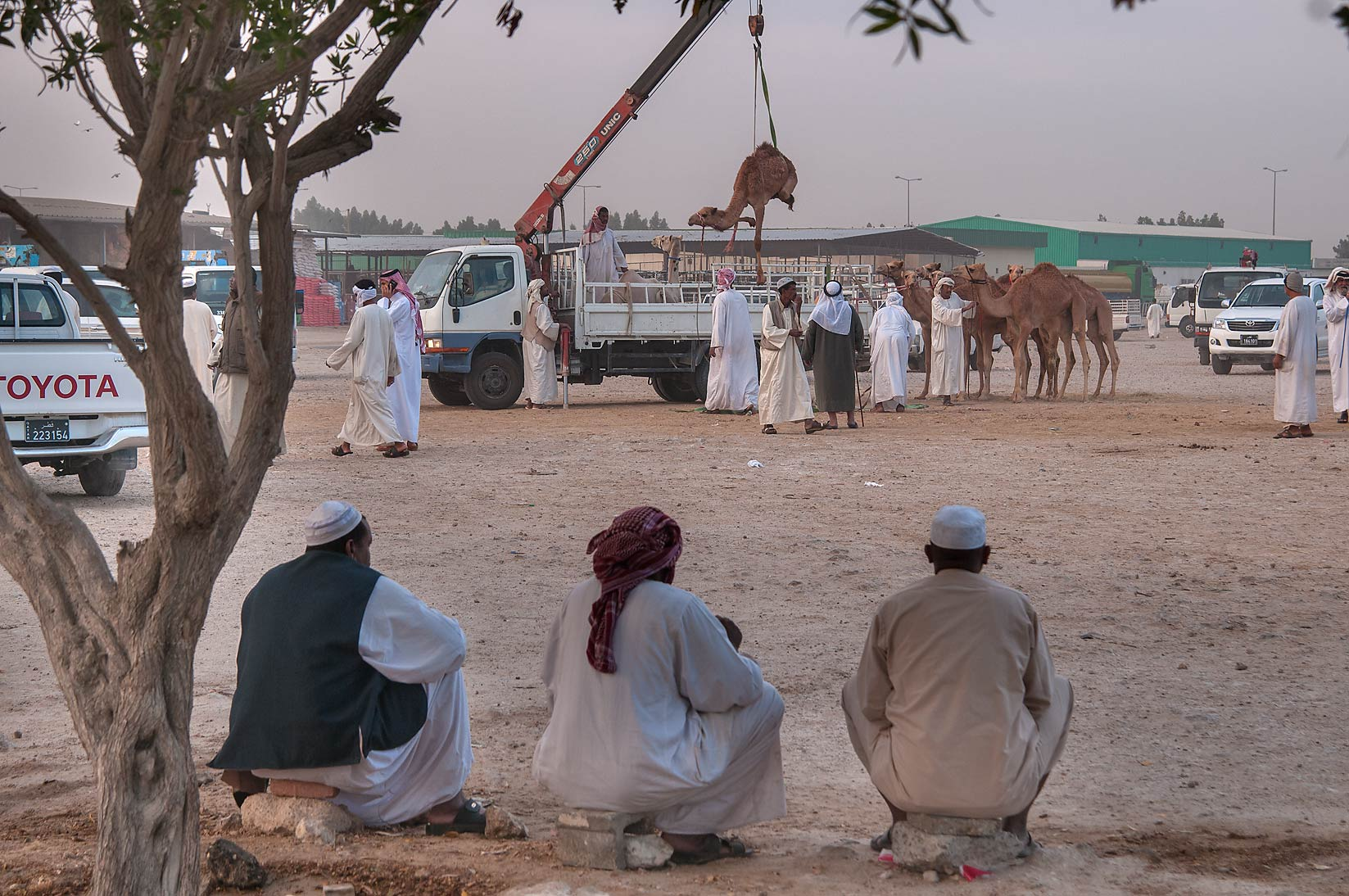
Men watch a camel being lifted by crane in the Abu Hamour Wholesale Market.

Aspire Zone in Baaya.

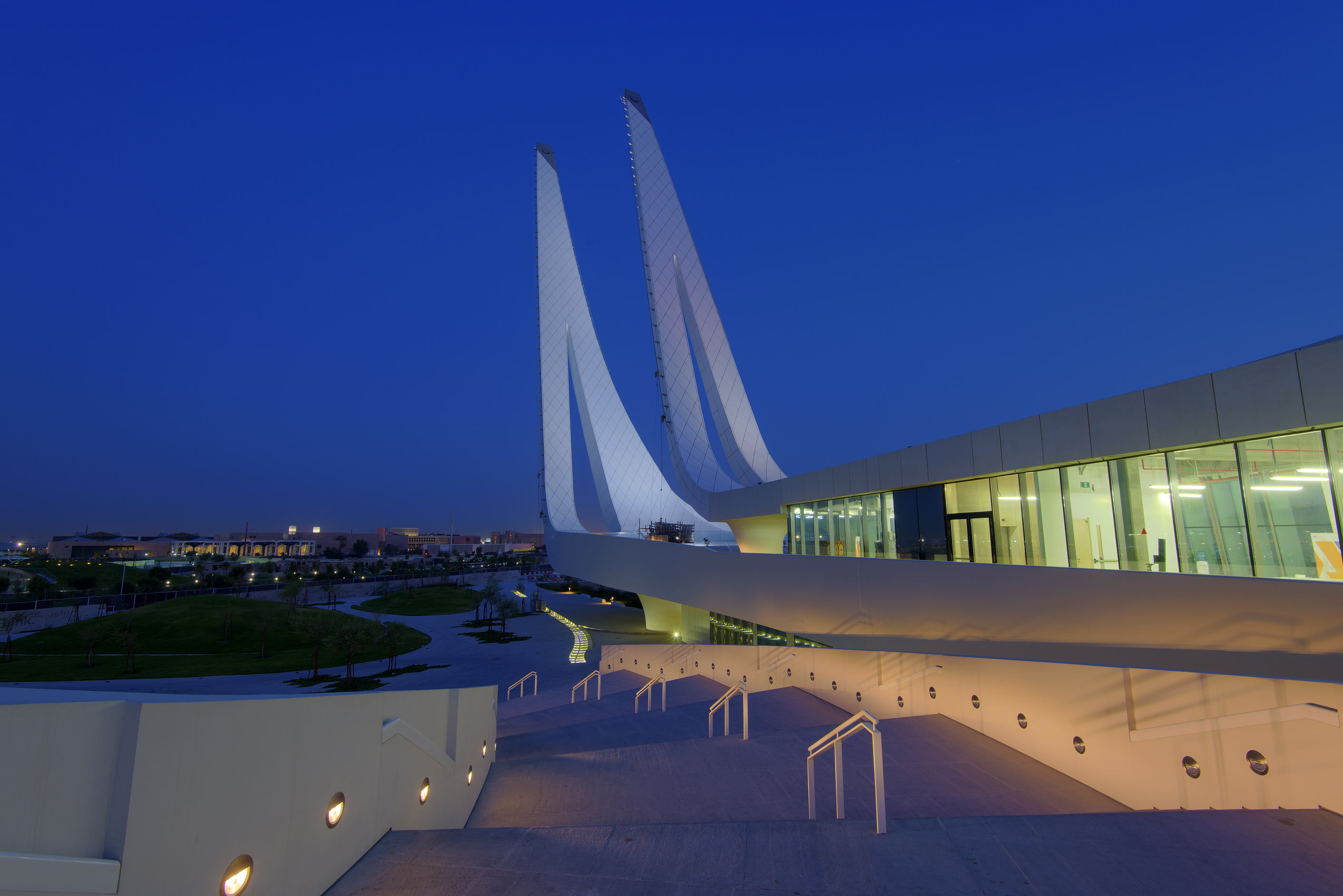
View from Education City Mosque.

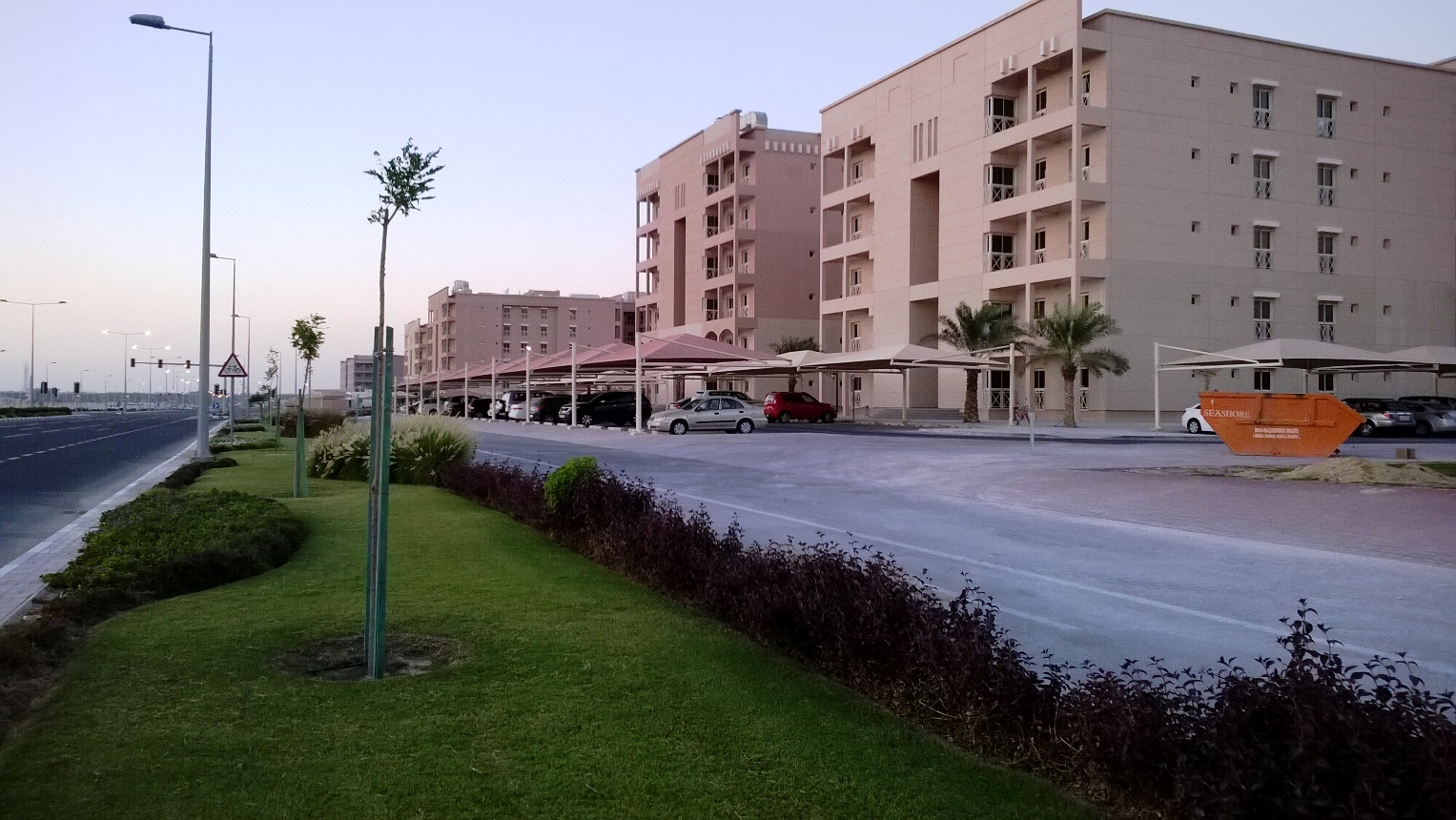
Barwa City in Mesaimeer.

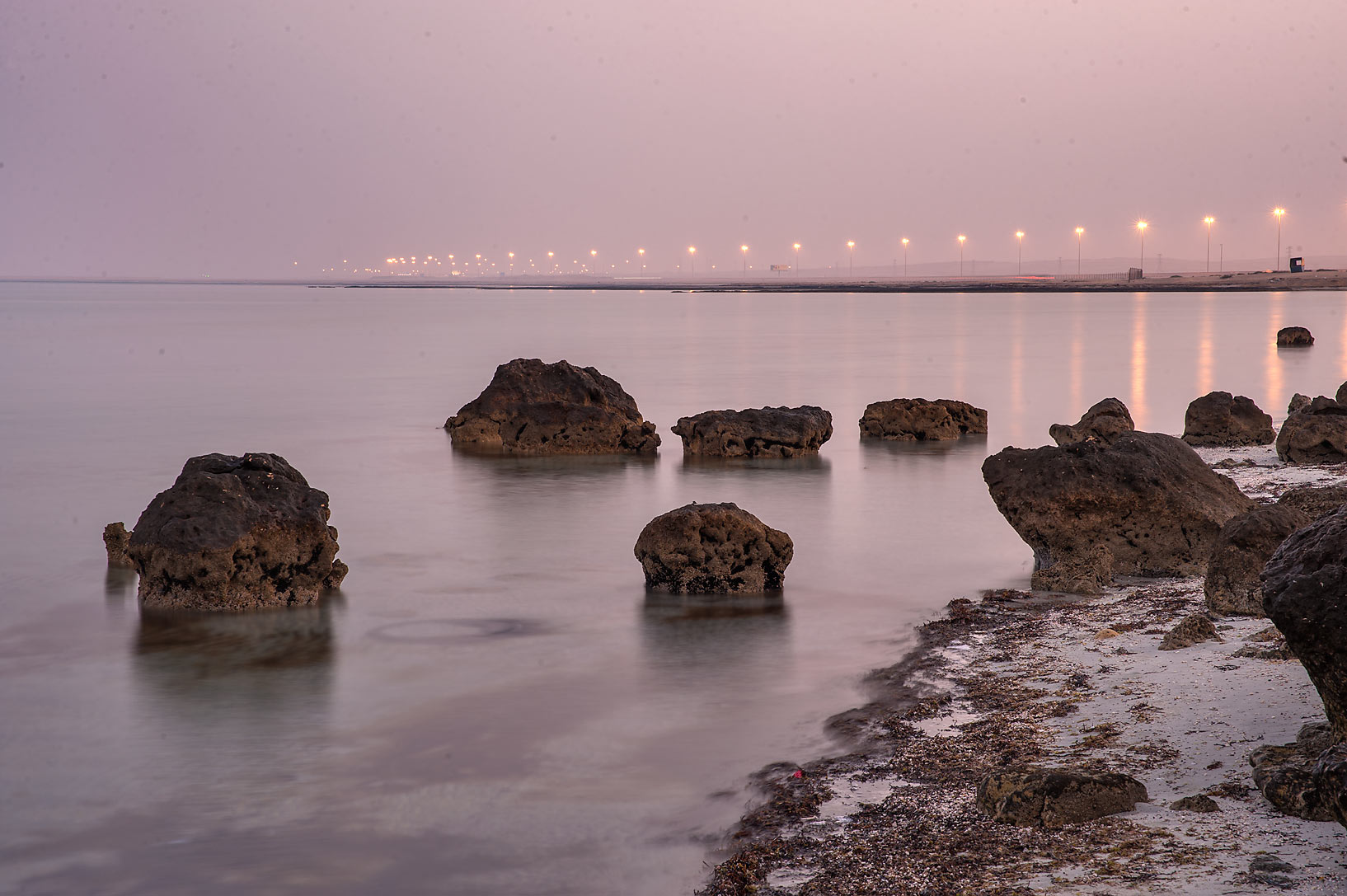
Rocks on a beach in Abu Samra near Salwa Road.

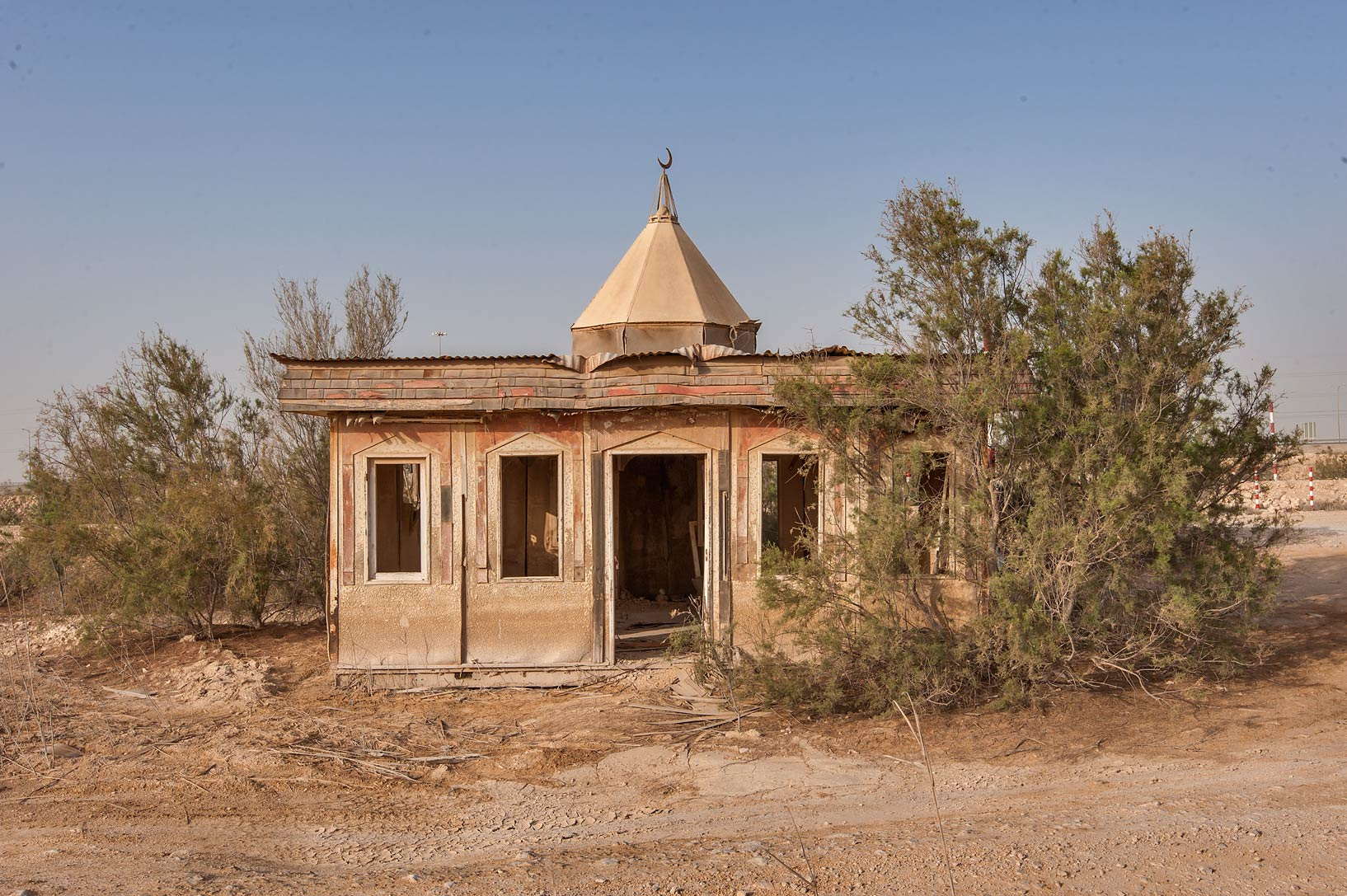
Dilapidated mosque near the water reservoir in Abu Nakhla.

The municipality is divided into 10 zones which are then divided into 1410 blocks.

=== Administrative zones ===
Al Rayyan Municipality has the following administrative zones as of 2015:

Zone no.	Census districts	Area	Population (2015)
51	Al Gharrafa; Gharrafat Al Rayyan; Izghawa; Bani Hajer; Al Seej; Rawdat Egdaim; Al Themaid	80.9 km^{2} (31.2 sq mi)	56,027
52	Al Luqta; Lebday; Old Al Rayyan; Al Shagub; Fereej Al Zaeem	13.4 km^{2} (5.2 sq mi)	18,433
53	New Al Rayyan; Al Wajbah; Muaither	110.9 km^{2} (42.8 sq mi)	77,875
54	Fereej Al Amir; Luaib; Muraikh; Baaya; Mehairja; Fereej Al Soudan	18.1 km^{2} (7.0 sq mi)	24,593
55	Fereej Al Soudan; Al Waab; Al Aziziya; New Fereej Al Ghanim; Fereej Al Murra; Fereej Al Manaseer; Bu Sidra; Muaither; Al Sailiya; Al Mearad	82.4 km^{2} (31.8 sq mi)	283,675
56	Fereej Al Asiri; New Fereej Al Khulaifat; Bu Samra; Al Mamoura; Abu Hamour; Mesaimeer; Ain Khaled	61.1 km^{2} (23.6 sq mi)	128,928
81	Mebaireek	160.5 km^{2} (62.0 sq mi)	12,483
83	Al Karaana	554.3 km^{2} (214.0 sq mi)	2,614
96	Abu Samra	801.7 km^{2} (309.5 sq mi)	984
97	Sawda Natheel	566.7 km^{2} (218.8 sq mi)	100
Municipality		2,450 km^{2} (950 sq mi)	605,712

=== Districts ===
Other settlements in Al Rayyan include:

- Al Aamriya (Arabic: العامرية)
- Al Hemaila (Arabic: الحميلة)
- Al Khaldiya (Arabic: الخالدية)
- Al Mukaynis (Arabic: مكينس)
- Al Rekayya (Arabic: الركية)
- Baida Al Gaa (Arabic: بيضا القاع)
- Eglat Faisal (Arabic: عقلة فيصل)
- Jaww Basheer (Arabic: جو بشير)
- Jariyan Al Batnah (Arabic: جريان البطنة)
- Lusail West (Arabic: لوسيل الغربية)
- Rawdat Al Jahhaniya (Arabic: روضة الجهانية)
- Ummahat Owaina (Arabic: امهات عوينة)
- Umm Al Afaei (Arabic: ام الافاعي)
- Umm Al Suwab (Arabic: ام الصوب)
- Umm Hawta (Arabic: ام حوطة)

== Economy ==
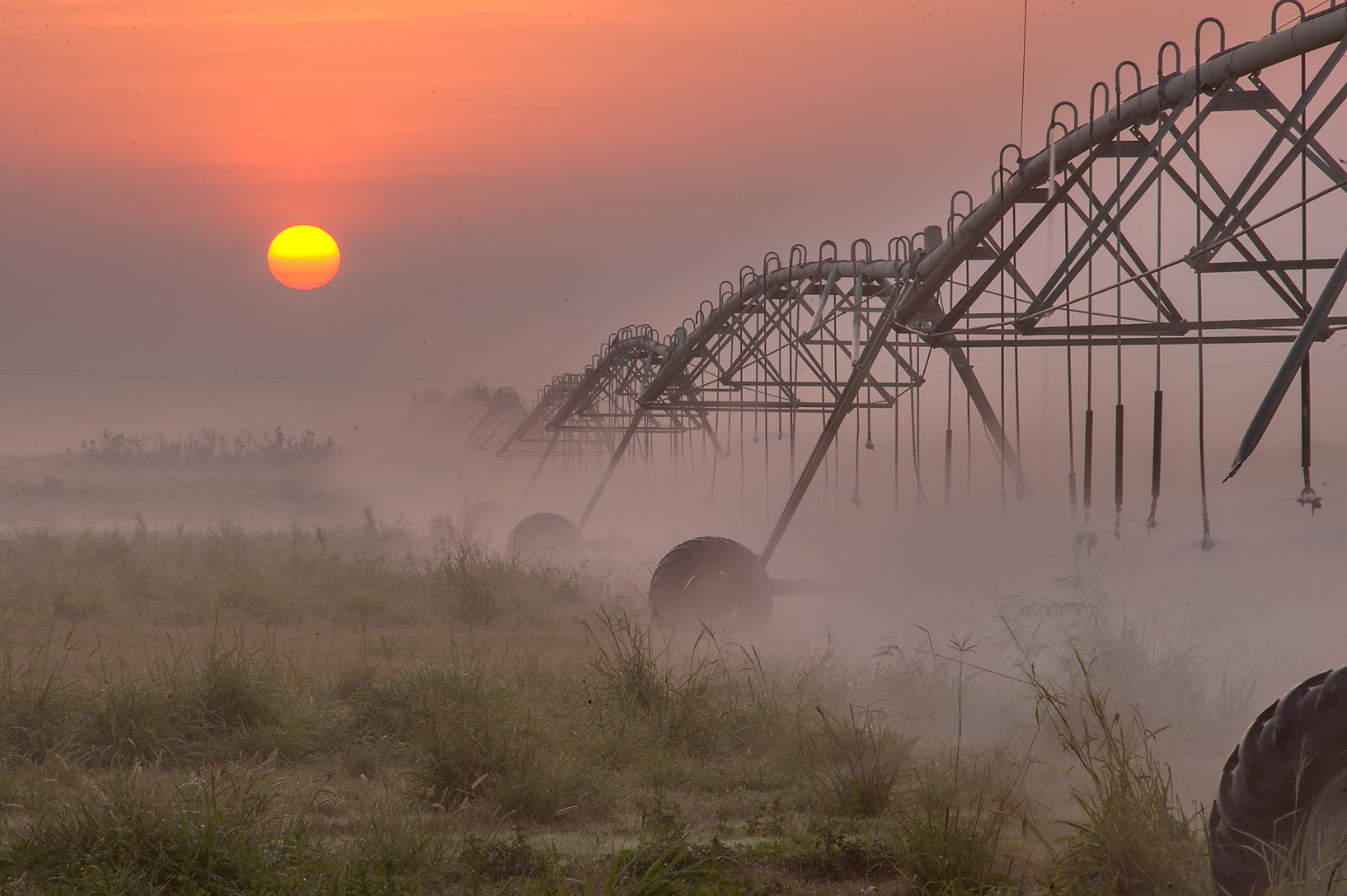
Center-pivot irrigation at Irkhaya Farms.

Due to Al Rayyan's lack of a coastline in its population centers in the eastern section, fishing and pearling did not play a part in building its economy; this is in sharp contrast to Qatar's other urban centers which were largely dependent on maritime activities. Instead, nomadic herding of livestock and small-scale crop cultivation comprised the livelihoods of its past inhabitants.

According to government statistics recorded when Al-Shahaniya was still integrated into Al Rayyan, the municipality accounted for the majority of Qatar's farming activities. In 2015, 36% of Qatar's total farmland was based in Al Rayyan, putting it just ahead of Al Khor with 35% of the country's farmland. There were 499 farms occupying 17,136 hectares, 256 of which were involved in cultivating crops, 234 of which were mixed operations, 8 of which raised livestock, and 1 categorized as "other". The municipality had a livestock inventory of 108,508, including 52,582 sheep and 27,380 goats. Livestock numbers were surpassed only by Al Khor.

Until 2017, Muaither Yard was the only farmers' market in the municipality. Qatar Foundation established Torba Farmers' Market in Education City in November 2017. Only organically grown produce is sold at this market.

== Education ==
According to the 2015 census conducted by the Ministry of Municipality and Environment, there were a total of 199 schools located in Al Rayyan at that time. State schools were recorded as amounting to 108 in the 2016 education census – 50 were exclusively for girls and 58 were for boys. A slightly higher number of students were male, at 23,558 compared to 23,455 female students.

Entrance to Carnegie Mellon University in Education City.

Several schools have transferred to Al Rayyan from Doha as a result of lower operating costs and closer proximity to students.

Various universities main campuses in Education City, a city-scale project by Qatar Foundation which is spread across the Al Gharrafa, Gharrafat Al Rayyan and Al Shagub districts of Al Rayyan City. Among the universities are:

- Carnegie Mellon University in Qatar
- Georgetown University in Qatar
- Hamad Bin Khalifa University
- Northwestern University in Qatar
- Texas A&M University at Qatar
- Virginia Commonwealth University - Qatar
- Weill Cornell Medical College in Qatar

== Healthcare ==
Healthcare standards in the municipality have been boosted by Sidra Medical and Research Center, which is in the Al Gharrafa district of Al Rayyan. Its initial inpatient hospital was formally opened in January 2018 with 400 beds. At peak operational capacity, it will serve more than 275,000 patients per year. Biomedical research is also conducted at Sidra, with its research facilities becoming operational in 2015.

Aspetar, a specialised orthopaedic and sports medicine hospital, is found in the Aspire Zone in the Baaya district. Commencing operations in 2007, it was the first-ever sports medicine hospital in the Middle East region. It earned accreditation as a FIFA Medical Centre of Excellence in 2009.

Overall, there were twenty-six health care facilities recorded by the 2015 government census. Sixty-four pharmacies were recorded in the municipality in 2013 by Qatar's Supreme Council of Health.

== Transportation ==
=== Public transport ===
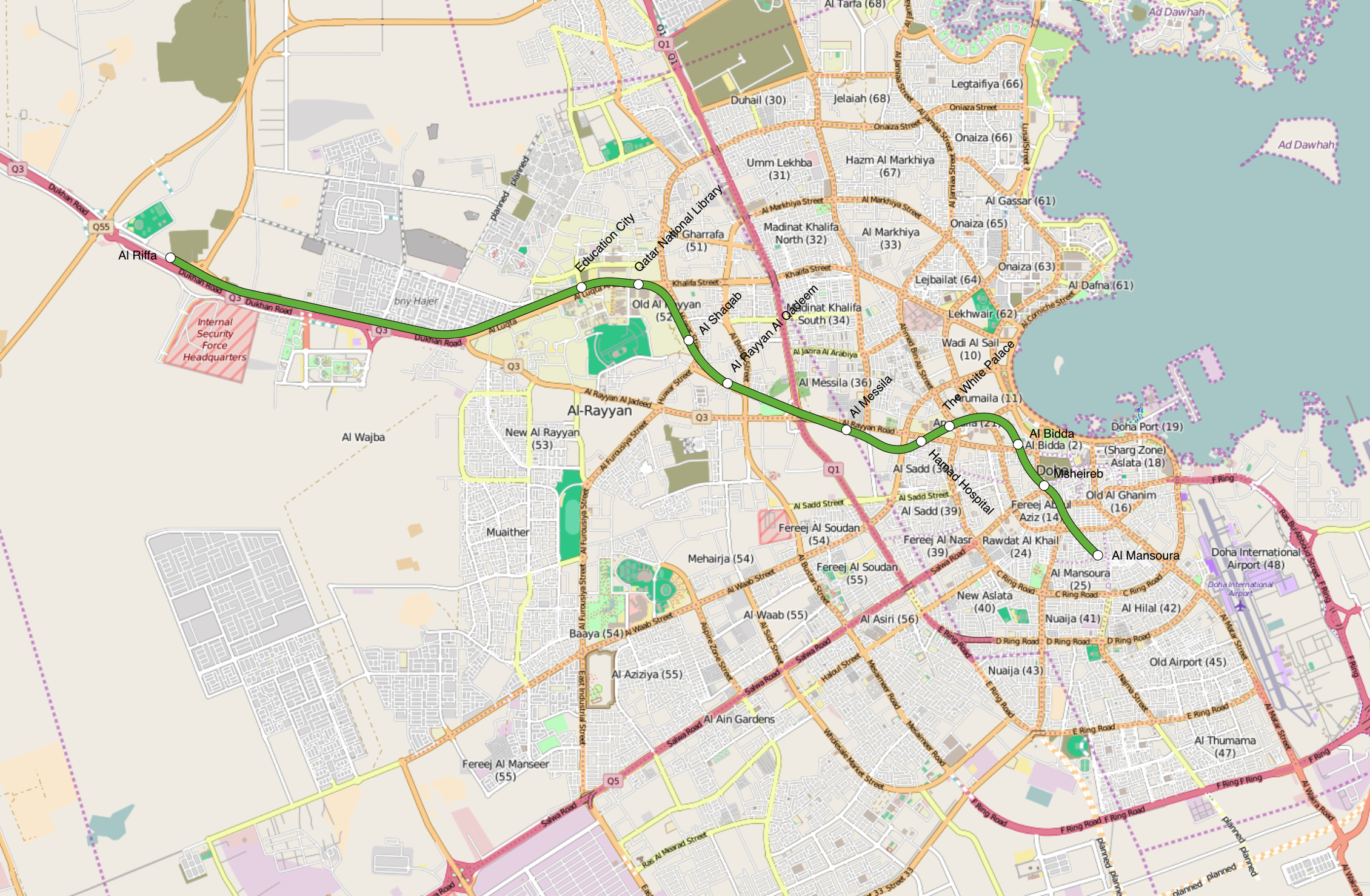
Doha Metro's Green Line, also known as Education Line.

Public transport in the municipality is generally poor and not used by most of its residents due to a lack of facilities at the central station and inconsistent headway.

=== Metro ===
Doha Metro's Green Line, also called the Education Line, passes through Al Rayyan. There are metro stations in Al Shagub, Education City and Qatar National Library, and Old Al Rayyan. The line was opened to the public on 10 December 2019.

=== Roads ===
==== Salwa Road ====
Salwa Road runs from Doha proper to Abu Samra on the Qatar-Saudi border for roughly 95 km. For the most part, the road passes solely through Al Rayyan Municipality, but there is a stretch of highway that serves as the dividing line between Al Rayyan Municipality and Al-Shahaniya Municipality. It is an important commercial artery in the municipality's eastern extremity, hosting car showrooms, superstores and outlet stores. Moreover, many rural areas to the south-west of Metropolitan Doha are connected to the highway network through Salwa Road. It runs through the following districts in Al Rayyan, sorted from east to west and north to south:

- Fereej Al Soudan
- Al Mamoura
- Al Waab
- Abu Hamour
- Ain Khaled
- Al Aziziya
- New Fereej Al Ghanim
- Fereej Al Murra
- Bu Sidra
- Industrial Area
- Al Sailiya
- Mebaireek
- Abu Nakhla
- Al Khaldiya
- Ummahat Owaina
- Al Mukaynis
- Markhiyat Al Darb
- Umm Al Suwab
- Al Karaana
- Lusail West
- Dohat Salwa
- Abu Samra

==== Dukhan Highway ====
Westward travel towards Dukhan and Al-Shahaniya is facilitated by the roughly 66 km-long Dukhan Highway. The road spans from Bani Hajer in the east to Dukhan in the west. It runs through the following districts in Al Rayyan, sorted from east to west and north to south:

- Bani Hajer
- Al Wajbah
- Al Seej
- Rawdat Al Jahhaniya
- Umm Al Afaei
- Umm Leghab

==== Orbital Highway ====
The Orbital Highway is Qatar's longest road at 195 km. Created to bypass the traffic congestion in Doha, the highway begins in Mesaieed and ends in the north at Ras Laffan. The most important highway junctions for Al Rayyan is the Orbital Highway/Salwa Road junction and Orbital Highway/Dukhan Highway junction.

== Infrastructure ==
=== Government infrastructure ===
On 9 December 2015, the Ministry of Municipality and Environment inaugurated a government services complex in Al Rayyan City. Four days later, the Ministry of Economy and Commerce established a branch at the services complex. Later in May 2016 another government services complex was created in Mesaimeer. Almost all government ministries are represented at the complex.

In the south-west, Abu Samra accommodates Qatar's sole border crossing with Saudi Arabia. The Ministry of Interior maintains an Immigration Department office and Customs Department office near the border crossing. On 5 June 2017, when a quartet composed of Saudi Arabia, the United Arab Emirates, Bahrain and Egypt severed ties with Qatar, the border crossing was shut down.

=== Worker accommodation ===
Municipal estimates put the number of residential units for workers at 173,550 for 2017. A massive labor camp in the Umm Al Afaei district with a capacity for 21,000 workers was announced in 2013. The project was reported to cost QAR 122 million.

== Landmarks and historic sites ==
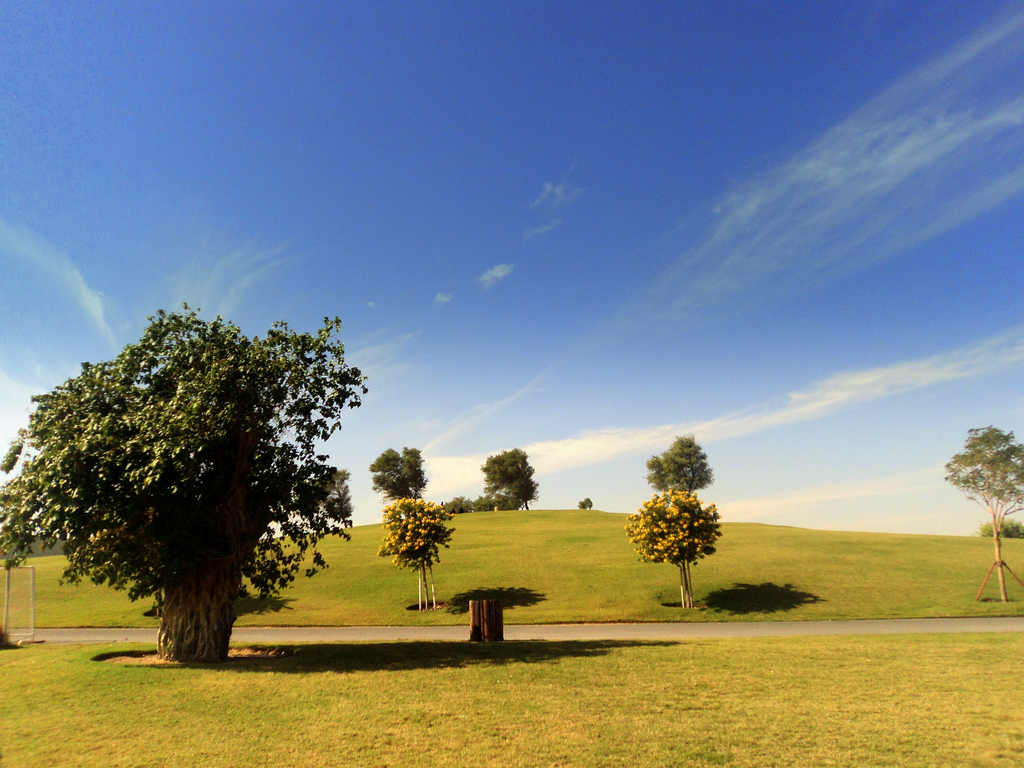
Trees at Aspire Park.

There are a number of historic forts in the municipality, most of which are located within Al Rayyan City. One such fort is Al Wajbah Fort, which was the setting of a battle between the Ottomans and Qataris in the Battle of Al Wajbah in 1893.

Education City, which houses most of Qatar's universities, is spread throughout the Al Gharrafa, Gharrafat Al Rayyan and Al Shagub districts of Al Rayyan City, as is several of Qatar Foundation's institutes such as the Qatar Science & Technology Park and Qatar National Convention Centre.

Several multi-sports clubs are based in the municipality: Al Rayyan SC, Al-Gharafa SC, Muaither SC, Mesaimeer SC and Al Sailiya SC. All of these fall within the boundaries of Al Rayyan City.

Al Rayyan hosts a racing and equestrian club. Aspire Tower and Aspire Park are also nestled in the municipality, specifically on Al Waab Street in Baaya, a district of Al Rayyan City. A large-scale Venetian style mall known as Villaggio Mall is also located in the Baaya district. Doha Zoo is found nearby to these attractions in Al Aziziya. According to the Ministry of Municipality and Environment, the municipality accommodates 20 parks as of 2018.

== Demographics ==
Historical population
Year	Pop.	±%
1986	91,996	—
1997C	169,774	+84.5%
2004C	272,860	+60.7%
2010C	392,661	+43.9%
2015C	605,712	+54.3%
c-census; e-estimate

Note: 2010 adjusted figures here, 2015 preliminary figures

Al Rayyan's workforce is relatively diversified compared to the other municipalities. It was reported that in 2010, construction accounted for the largest sector of the workforce at 74,00, with manufacturing coming second at 15,500, followed by transportation and storage (7,900) and education (7,800). Many employed residents work outside the municipality, in Doha.

The following table is a breakdown of registered live births by nationality and sex for Al Rayyan. Places of birth are based on the home municipality of the mother at birth.

Registered live births by nationality and sex
Year	Qatari			Non-Qatari			Total		
Year	M	F	Total	M	F	Total	M	F	Total
1984	726	690	1416	566	538	1104	1292	1223	2520
1985	762	746	1508	555	560	1115	1317	1305	2623
1986	818	786	1604	658	649	1307	1476	1435	2911
1987	892	768	1660	761	681	1442	1653	1449	3102
1988	1043	915	1958	801	827	1628	1844	1742	3586
1989	923	927	1859	801	850	1651	1724	1777	3501
1990	1012	961	1973	815	752	1567	1827	1713	3540
1991	1038	913	1956	657	630	1287	1695	1548	3243
1992	1147	1026	2173	734	711	1445	1881	1737	3618
1993	1133	1086	2219	666	660	1326	1799	1746	3545
1994	N/A								
1995	1194	1188	2382	712	639	1351	1906	1827	3733
1996	1105	1053	2158	622	622	1244	1727	1675	3402

Registered live births by nationality and sex
Year	Qatari			Non-Qatari			Total		
Year	M	F	Total	M	F	Total	M	F	Total
1997	1208	1198	2406	768	746	1514	1976	1944	3920
1998	1251	1203	2454	754	745	1499	2005	1948	3953
1999	1303	1274	2577	830	806	1636	2133	2080	4213
2000	1301	1323	2624	859	803	1662	2160	2126	4286
2001	1409	1377	2786	926	931	1857	2335	2308	4643
2002	1472	1357	2829	942	932	1874	2414	2289	4703
2003	1468	1421	2889	945	876	1821	2413	2297	4710
2004	1681	1567	3248	1063	1006	2069	2744	2573	5317
2005	1662	1616	3278	1233	1135	2368	2895	2751	5646
2006	1738	1654	3392	1290	1216	2506	3028	2870	5898
2007	1865	1838	3703	1457	1357	2814	3322	3195	6517
2008	1975	1990	3965	1735	1635	3370	3710	3625	7335
2009	1774	1629	3403	1948	1777	3725	3722	3406	7128
