= Sherborne Qatar =

Sherborne School
- Doha; Qatar

Information
- Established: 2009
- Head teacher: Mary Robertson-Barnett
- Age: 3 to 18
- Houses: Ahmed; Copeland; Moza; Cutler; Hamad; Cook
- Website: https://sherborneqatar.org/

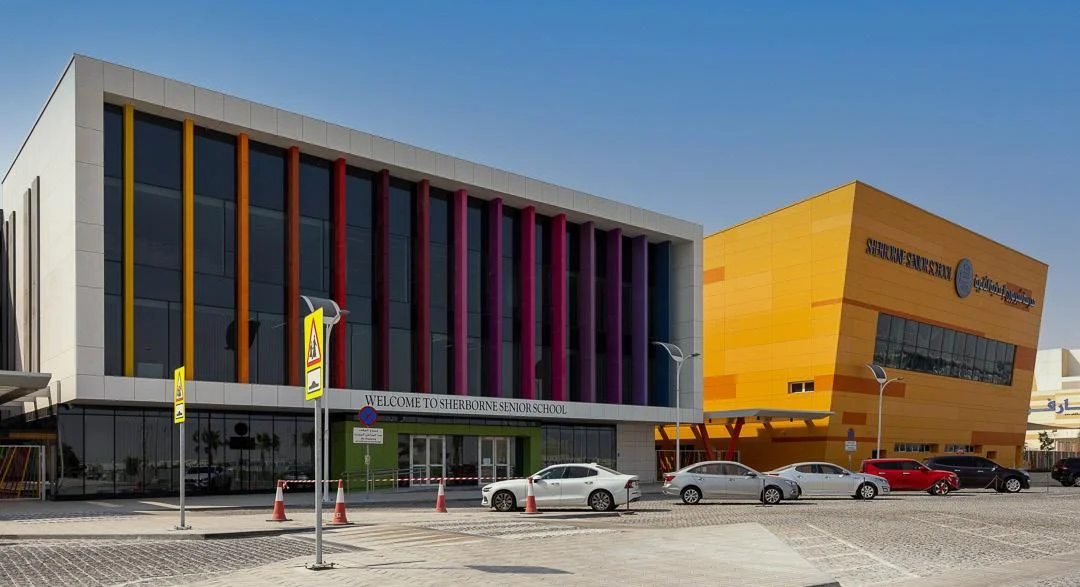
Sherborne School, previously known as Sherborne Senior School (not updated in photo)

Sherborne Qatar consists of four English-speaking schools operated in Qatar by the UK-based Sherborne International. The four schools are Sherborne School (Mall of Qatar) for pupils aged 3 to 18, Sherborne Qatar Preparatory School (Bani Hajer), for pupils aged 3 to 11, and Sherborne Qatar School for Boys (Al-Rayyan) for pupils aged 3 to 11 and Sherborne Qatar School for Girls (Al-Ebb) for pupils aged 3 to 18. Inside of the Bani Hajer site includes a separate Special Educational Needs school, Sherborne Qetaf, for students aged 3 to 11.

Sherborne Qatar has been incorporated in the Ministry of Education's educational reform program, the 'Outstanding Schools Program'. The school has been described as a "a good school with significant outstanding features, providing a high quality of education for all of its pupils and fully meets the standards" in British School Overseas inspection report.

The school is based on the original in Sherborne, Dorset, United Kingdom.

== History ==
Sherborne was established in Qatar in 2009 at the invitation of the Supreme Education Council. A member of the ruling family, Abdullah bin Ahmed Al Thani, had recommended the school to the council. It was the first Sherborne branch established outside the United Kingdom. Colin Niven was the founding principal.

In 2021, Sherborne Senior relocated from its site in Bani Hajer, to a new site by the mall of Qatar in Al Rayyan, Doha. Starting from September 2024, the Sherborne Senior School, rebranded to Sherborne School, will begin to accept students aged 3–18, within the same site, while the Al-Rayyan site, Sherborne Prep, will become a new, boys-only school from 3–18.

As of February 2025, Ms. Mary Roberton-Barnett has resigned.

== Memberships ==
The schools are members of the following organisations:

- QUESS (Qatar Unified English Speaking Schools)
- BSME (British Schools in the Middle East)
- IAPS
