= Al Gharrafa =

Al Gharrafa الغرافة
- District
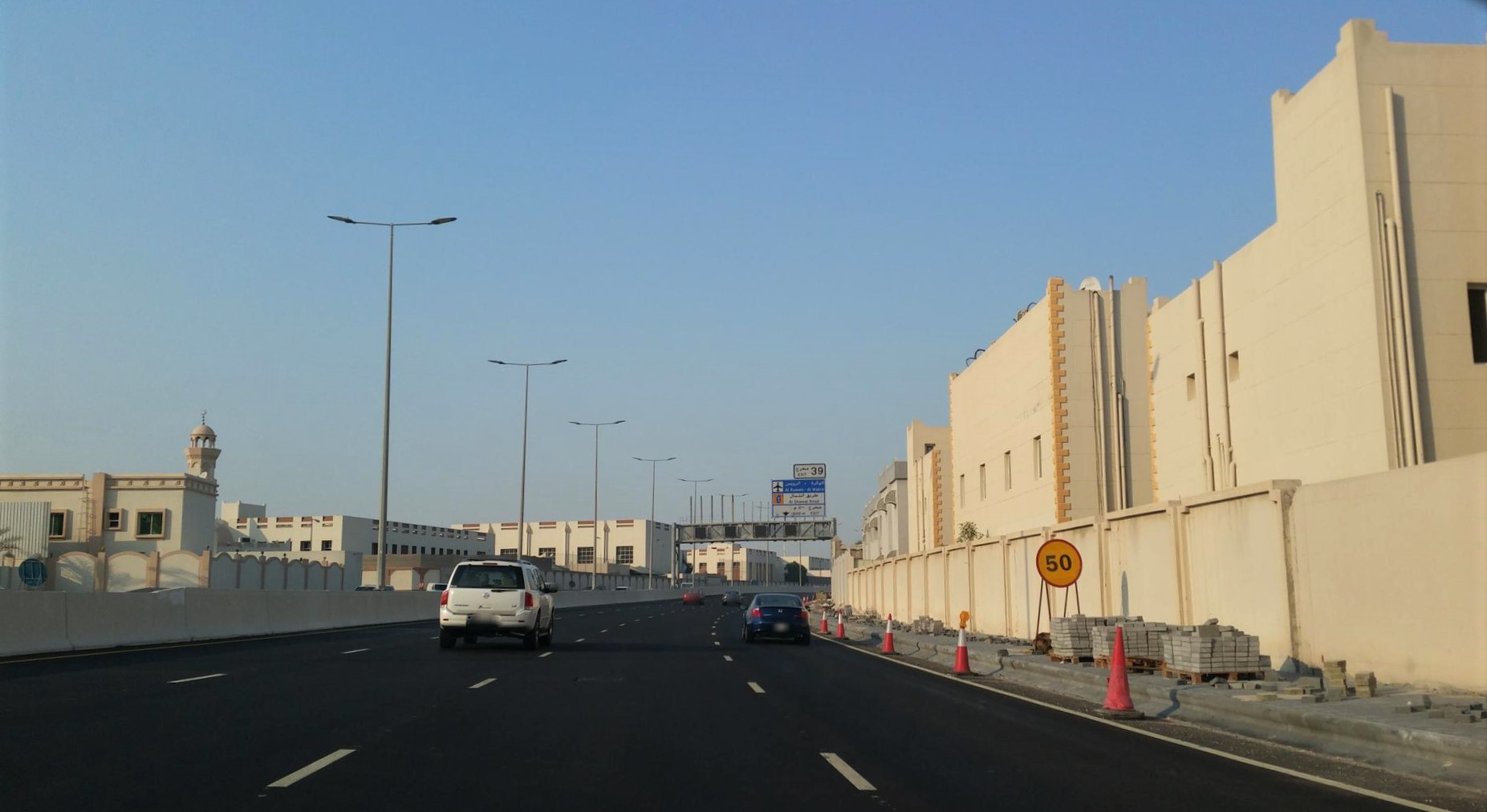
- Al Gharrafa Street in 2020.

- Location within Qatar
- Coordinates: 25.329790°N 51.447903°E
- Country: Qatar
- Municipality: Al Rayyan
- Zone: Zone 51
- District no.: 47

Area
  - Total: 10.5 km^{2} (4.1 sq mi)
- Elevation: 25 m (82 ft)

Al Gharrafa (Arabic: الغرافة, romanized: Al Gharrāfah) is a Qatari district of Al Rayyan City, which is located in the municipality of Al Rayyan. In close proximity to Education City and constituting a part of the Doha Metropolitan Area, the Doha Expressway and Al Shamal Highway run along the district. Many malls operate out of the area. To the east, it neighbors the largely residential areas of Duhail and Madinat Khalifa North, therefore Al Gharrafa is largely a retail hub for nearby residential areas. Doha's downtown is 10 kilometres (6.2 mi) to the southeast.

== Etymology ==
In Arabic, gharrafa translates as "to scoop up". It was so named because it is a low-lying floodplain from whence locals would collect water in the past.

== History ==
J.G. Lorimer's mentioned Al Gharrafa in 1908 in his Gazetteer of the Persian Gulf, referring to it as "Qarāfah". He stated that it lay "8 miles west of Dohah" and remarked on the presence of a masonry well that is only 3 feet deep yielding good water.

The Al Gharrafa Youth Centre was opened in 1982 to promote the fine arts among the youth and held community exhibitions in its early years.

== Geography ==
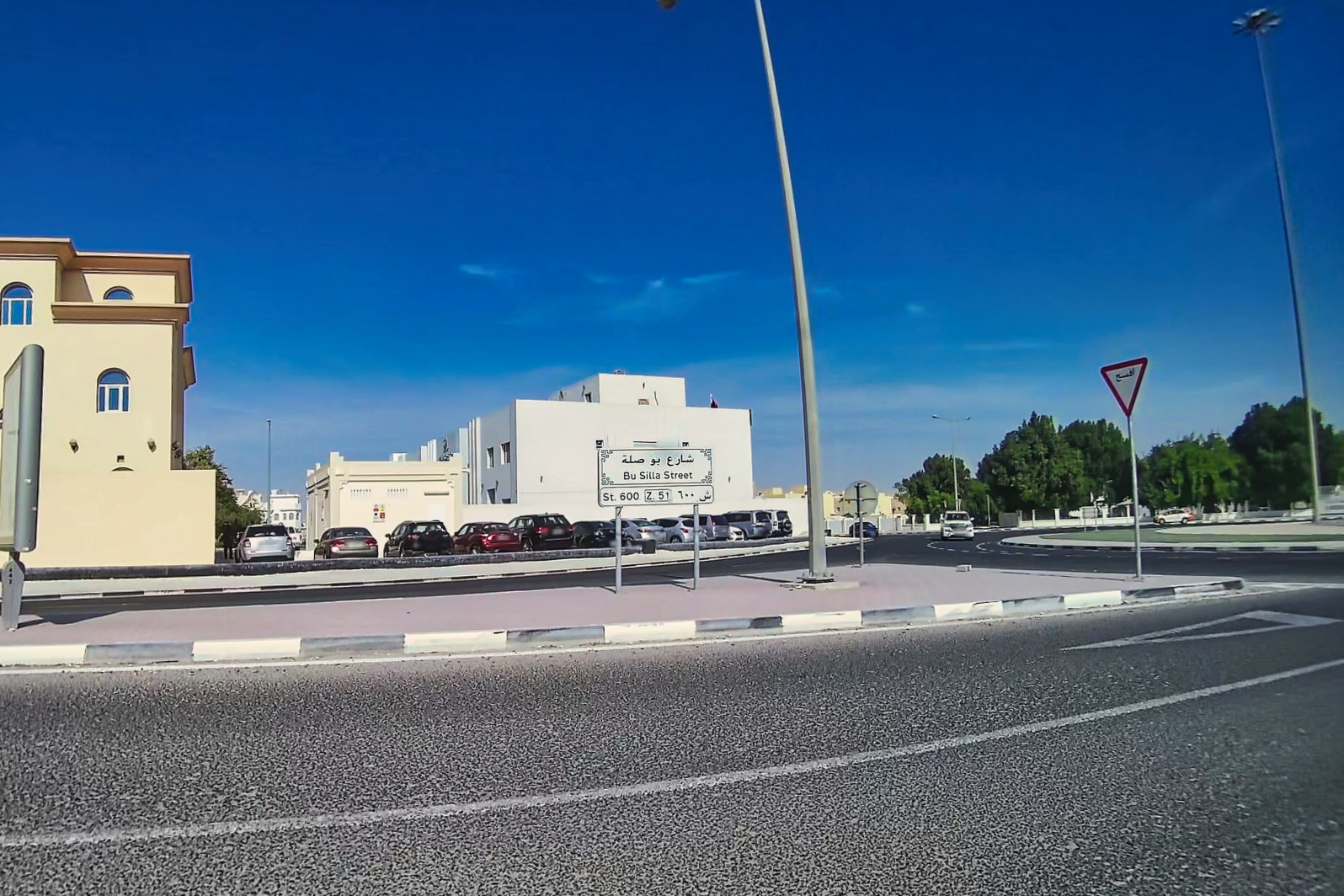
Sign for Bu Silla Street in Al Gharrafa.

Several of Qatar Foundation's facilities and projects (notably Education City) are located in Al Gharrafa and its surrounding districts. Due to the district's fairly large size, it shares several borders. To the west is Gharrafat Al Rayyan, which hosts the Qatar Science & Technology Park, the Qatar National Convention Centre, and other facilities of Education City. Located to the south-west of Al Gharrafa is the district of Al Shagub, which accommodates some of Education City's universities.

Other borders include Old Al Rayyan and Al Luqta to the south, Madinat Khalifa North, Umm Lekhba and Duhail of Doha Municipality to the east, and Al Kharaitiyat of Umm Salal Municipality and Izghawa 51 to the north.

== Landmarks ==
- Sidra Medical and Research Center, a subsidiary of Qatar Foundation, is located on Al Gharrafa Street.
- Thani bin Jassim Stadium is located on Al Zubar Street.
- LuLu Hypermarket is located on Wadi Bisha Street.
- Al Gharrafa Health Centre is located on Abu Silla Street.
- Fereej Al Gharrafa Stadium, administered by the Qatar Olympic Committee, is located on Al Arqam Bin Abi Al Arqam Street.
- Al Gharrafa Souq is located on Al Shamal Road.
- Al Gharrafa Park is located between Awf ibn al-Harith Street and Maan ibn Uday Street.
- Dasman Center is located on Al Shamal Road.
- Al Rayyan Municipality maintains a district office on Abu Silla Street.
- Landmark Mall Doha is located on Al Shamal Road.

== Central Municipal Council ==
When free elections of the Central Municipal Council first took place in Qatar during 1999, Al Gharrafa was designated the seat of constituency no. 21. It would remain the headquarters of constituency no. 21 for the next three consecutive elections until the fifth municipal elections in 2015, when it was made the headquarters of constituency no. 15. Also included in its constituency is south Izghawa and south Al Kharaitiyat. In the inaugural municipal elections in 1999, Ahmed Hussein Al Kubaisi won the elections, receiving 21%, or 88 votes. The runner-up candidate was Mohammed Salem Al Marri, whose share of the votes was 18.9%, or 42 votes. Voter turnout was 68.6%. Elections in 2002 saw Nasser Salman Al-Dosari elected as the constituent official. In 2007, Mubarak Faresh Salem won the elections, and retained his seat in the 2011, and 2015 elections.

== Sports ==
Multi-sports club Al-Gharafa SC is based in the district. The football team plays its home games at Thani bin Jassim Stadium.

== Transport ==
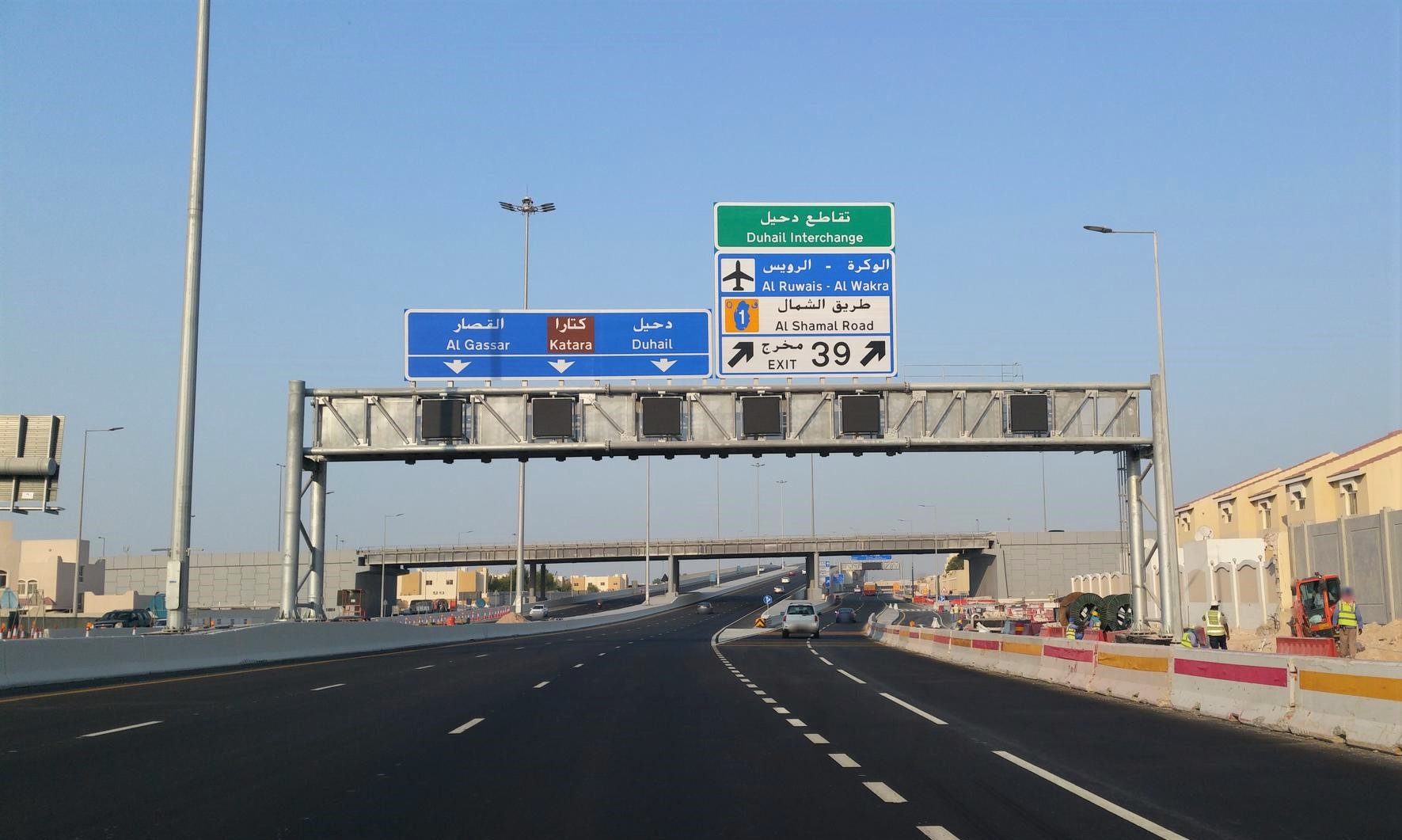
Beginning of Duhail-Al Gharrafa Bridge in Al Gharrafa.

Currently, the underground Al Gharrafa Metro Station is under construction, having been launched during Phase 2A. Once completed, it will be part of Doha Metro's Green Line.

== Qatar National Master Plan ==
The Qatar National Master Plan (QNMP) is described as a "spatial representation of the Qatar National Vision 2030". As part of the QNMP's Urban Centre plan, which aims to implement development strategies in 28 central hubs that will serve their surrounding communities, Al Gharrafa has been designated a Town Centre, which is the third-highest designation.

The plan places an emphasis on developing the intersection of Al Markhiya Street and Doha Expressway as the heart of the Town Centre. As such, public transport will be oriented towards this area and both Al Markhiya Street and the Doha Expressway will have a higher density of mixed-use buildings.

== Education ==
The following schools are located in Al Gharrafa:

Name of School	Curriculum	Grade	Genders	Official Website	Ref
The Gulf English School	British	Kindergarten – Secondary	Both		
Al Gharafa Modern Kindergarten	Qatari	Kindergarten	Both	N/A	
