= Gharrafat Al Rayyan =

Gharrafat Al Rayyan غرافة الريان
- District
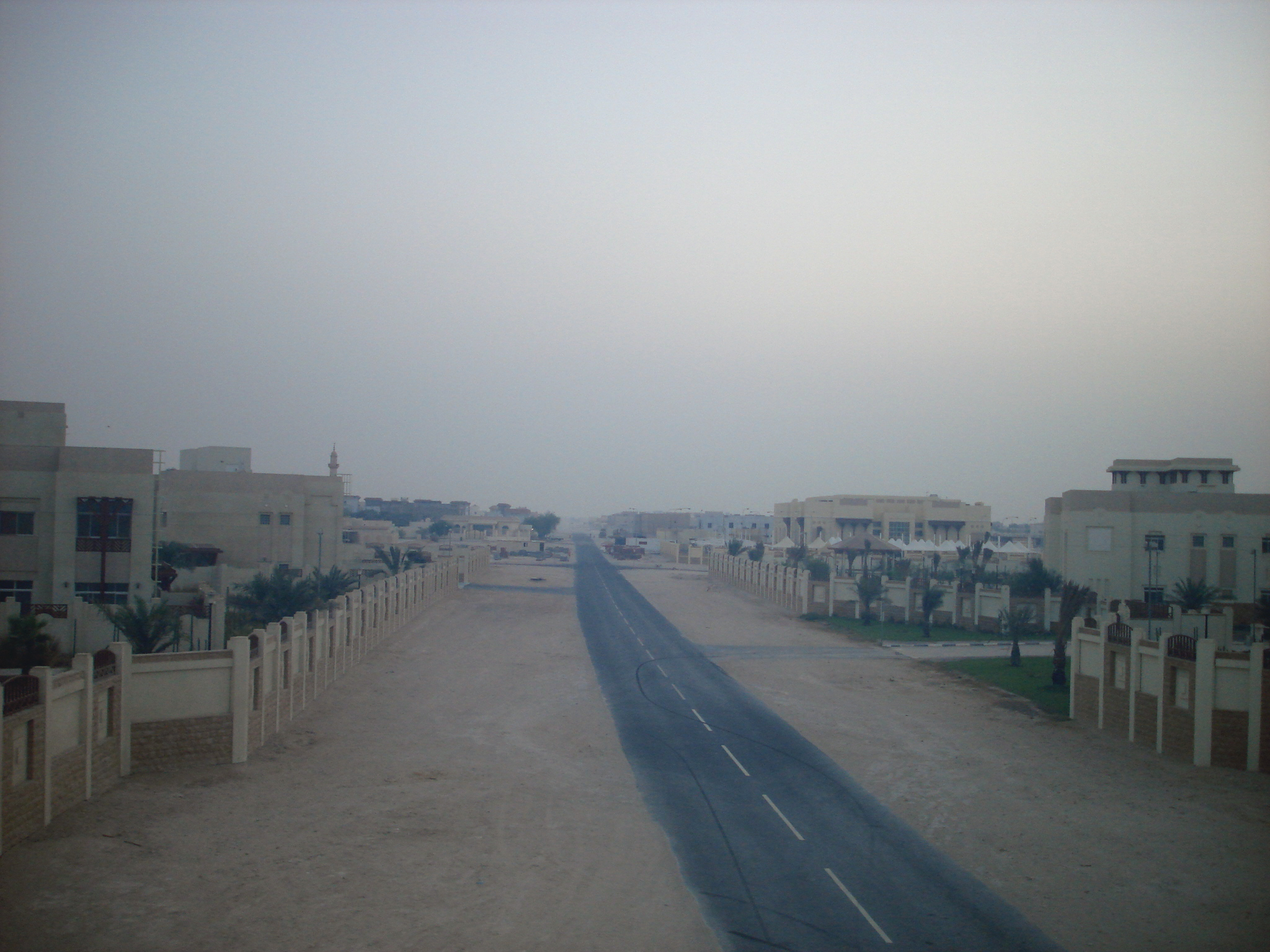
- View from Education City Community Housing bridge

- Location within Qatar
- Coordinates: 25.331917°N 51.427153°E
- Country: Qatar
- Municipality: Al Rayyan
- Zone: Zone 51
- District no.: 49

Area
  - Total: 8.0 km^{2} (3.1 sq mi)
- Elevation: 29 m (95 ft)

Gharrafat Al Rayyan (Arabic: غرافة الريان, romanized: Gharāfat ar Rayyān) is a district of Al Rayyan City in Qatar, located in the municipality of Al Rayyan.

== Etymology ==
Gharrafat is derived from the Arabic word meaning "to scoop up". This name was earned due to the area's low elevation, allowing it to act as a floodplain from whence locals would collect water in the past. The second part of its name originates from the city of Al Rayyan, which translates to "irrigation"; it was so named because it constitutes a part of the city.

== Infrastructure ==
The district houses the Qatar Science & Technology Park, the Qatar National Convention Centre, Education City community housing and other facilities of Qatar Foundation. North-east of the district is Al Gharrafa, which hosts the Sidra Medical and Research Center. To the south is the district of Al Shagub, which accommodates other facilities of Qatar Foundation, such as Education City's universities.

Gharrafat Al Rayyan Health Center services the district as well as the southern villages and towns in Umm Salal and Al Daayen municipalities.

The Ministry of Interior's General Directorate of Civil Defence is nestled in the district.

== Gallery ==
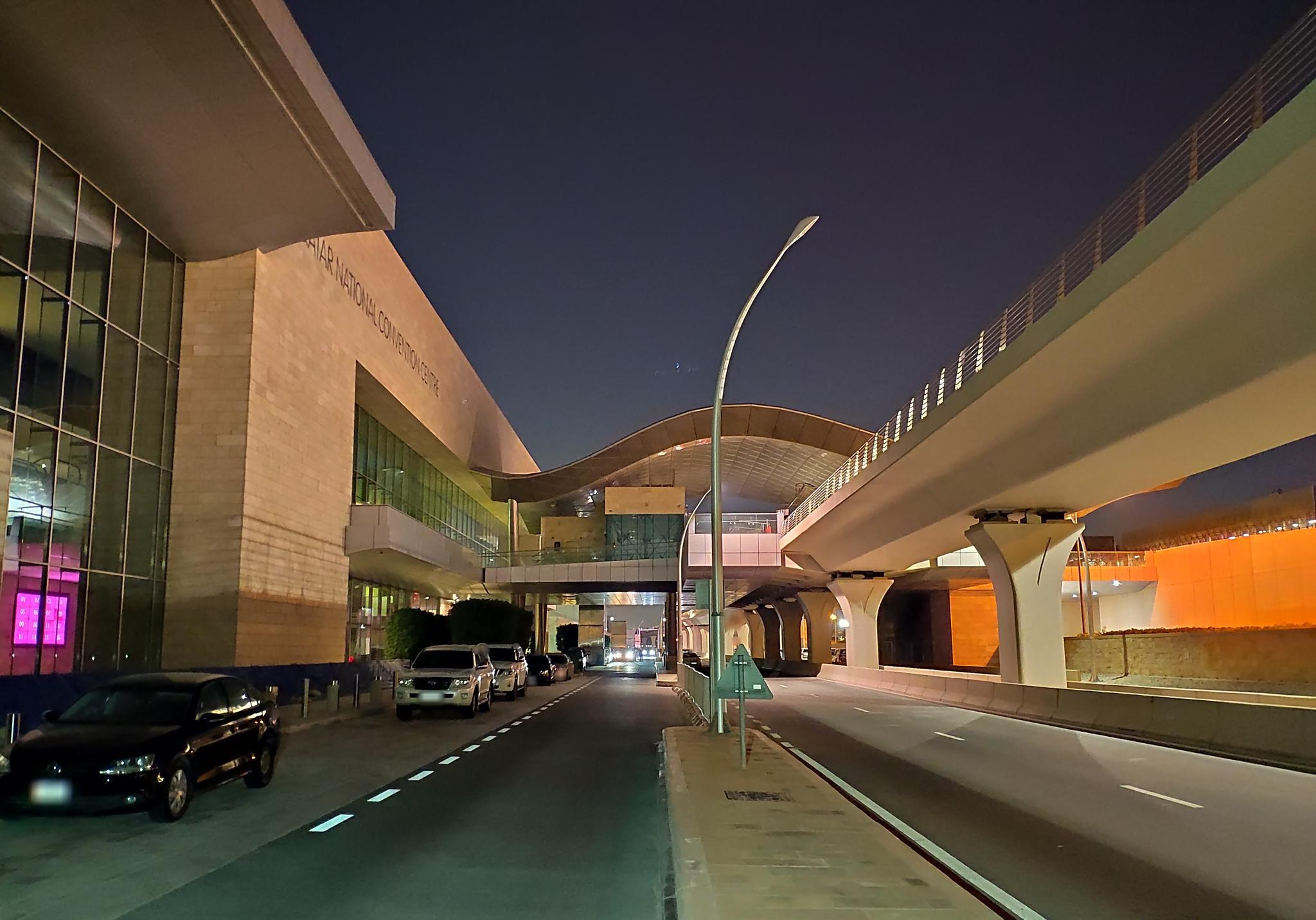
View of Qatar National Convention Centre in Gharrafat Al Rayyan.

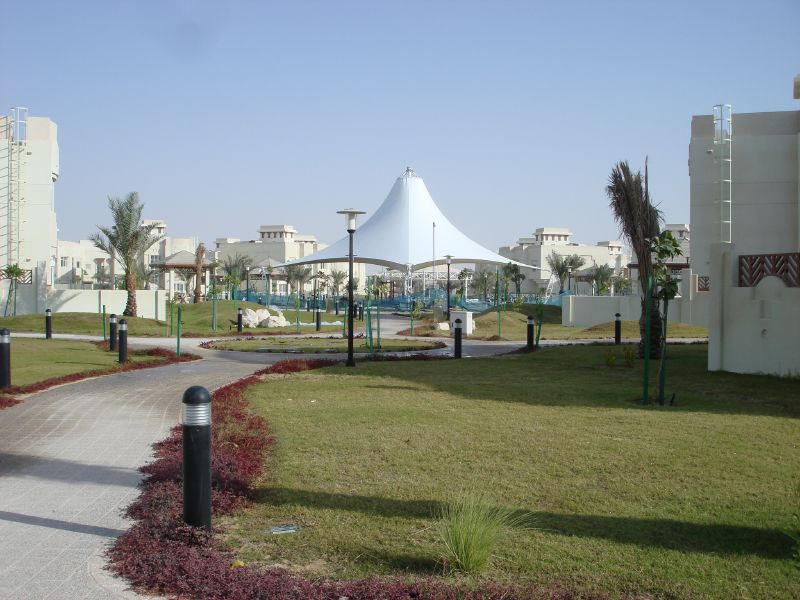
Education City Community Housing in Al Rayyan.
