= Izghawa =

Izghawa ازغوى
- District
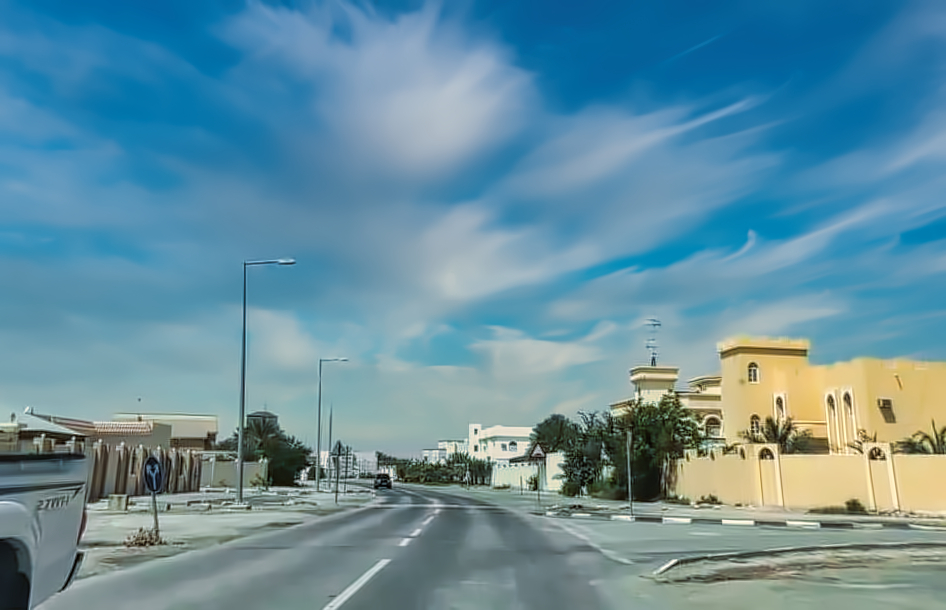
- Wadi Al Mashrab Street in Izghawa 71

- Location within Qatar
- Coordinates: 25.361149°N 51.420091°E
- Country: Qatar
- Municipality: Umm Salal / Al Rayyan
- Zone: Zone 71 (Umm Salal) / Zone 51 (Al Rayyan)
- District no.: 48

Area
  - Total: 11.8 km^{2} (4.6 sq mi)
- Elevation: 25 m (82 ft)

Izghawa (Arabic: ازغوى) is a district on the border between the municipalities of Umm Salal and Al Rayyan in Qatar. Consequently, its administration is split, with its western portion (Izghawa 71) administered by Umm Salal and the east (Izghawa 51) by Al Rayyan.

== Geography ==
The majority of urban settlement is based in the east, in Izghawa 51, some of which is situated in a rawda (depression). In the western portion, or Izghawa 71, there is a large undeveloped tract of land, some farms and a wadi named Wadi Izghawa Al Gharbi.

== Landmarks ==
One of the settlement's defining landmarks is the Izghawa Park. Occupying an area of over 14,000 m^{2} (150,000 sq ft), the park was opened in 2006 to provide a green space for residents. In addition to its numerous trees and ornamentals, the parks facilities include a mosque, a children's play area, a volleyball court, and a basketball court. In April 2018, the second-ever branch of The Center for the Empowerment and Care of Older Persons was constructed within the park. The center provides a range of services and facilities to those over 60 years old.

== Transport ==
Currently, the elevated Izghawa Metro Station is under construction, having been launched during Phase 2A. Once completed, it will be part of Doha Metro's Green Line.

== Education ==
Name of School	Curriculum	Grade	Genders	Official Website	Ref
Awfaz Global school – Izghawa Branch	British	Kindergarten – Secondary	Both	Official website	
Al Manar International School Althemaid Branch	American/IB	Kindergarten – Secondary	Both	Official website	
