= Al Egla =

Al Egla العقلة
- District
- Location within Doha Location within Qatar
- Coordinates: 25.3890°N 51.5095°E
- Country: Qatar
- Municipality: Al Daayen / Doha
- Zone: Zone 69
- District no.: 111

Area
  - Total: 4.3 km^{2} (1.7 sq mi)
- Elevation: 11 m (36 ft)

Al Egla (Arabic: العقلة) is a Qatari district whose management is split between the municipality of Al Daayen and the municipality of Doha. It adjoins the area of the planned city of Lusail.

Rather than traditional neighborhoods, Al Egla consists of two large gated compounds: Al Egla Gardens and Golf Gardens.

== Geography ==
Al Egla borders the following districts:

- West Bay Lagoon to the south, separated by Golf Course Street.
- Jabal Thuaileb to the east, separated by Wadi Al Gaeya Street.
- Al Kharayej to the north, separated by Wadi Al Gaeya Street.
- Al Tarfa to the west, separated by Al Khor Coastal Road.

== Landmarks ==
- The Doha Golf Club, which hosts the Qatar Masters tournament, is located in the southernmost area of Al Egla, off Al Khor Coastal Road.
- Shafallah Center, which assists people with special needs, has a branch on Wadi Al Gaeya Street.
- The Family Consulting Center (Wifaq) is located on Sidra Street. Construction of the Family Consulting Center in the district first began in April 2013 at a cost of QR 76 million. In June 2015, the building was completed with an overall area of over 19,000 square meters. Facilities inside the center include a lecture hall, library and kindergarten.

== Gallery ==
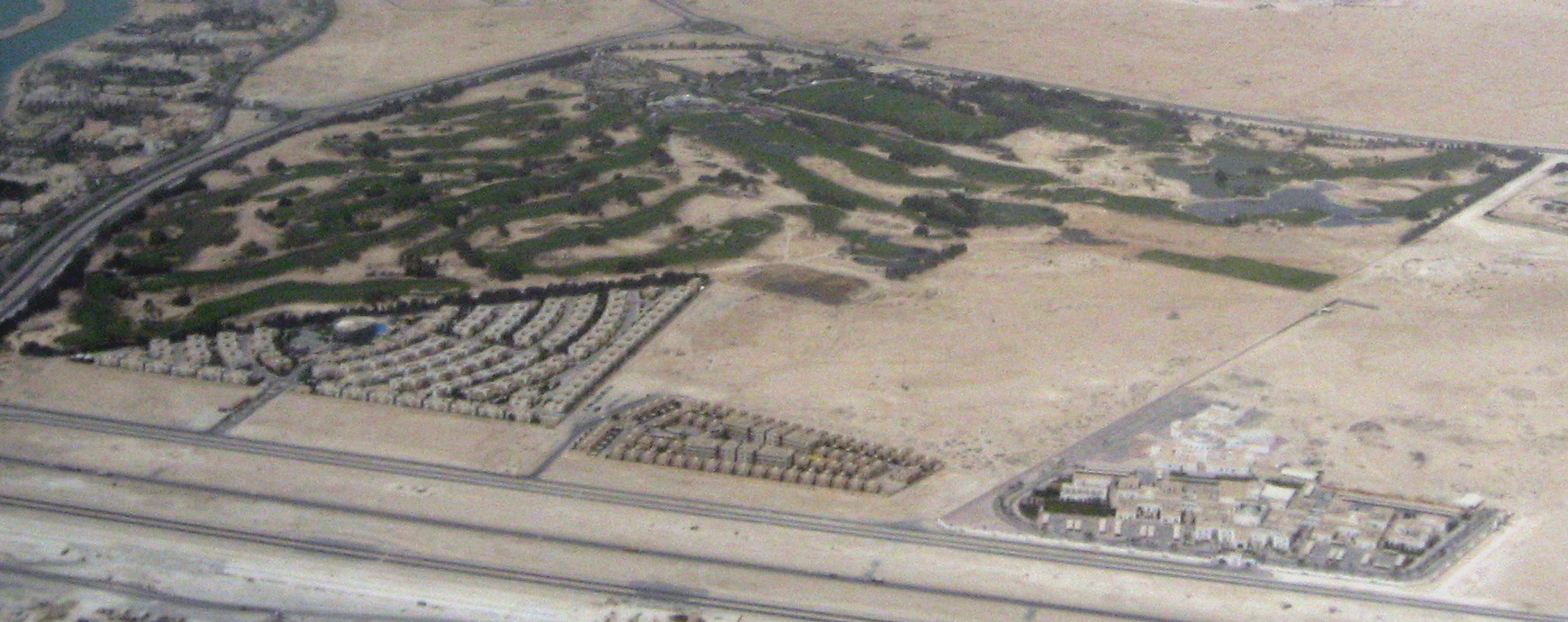
Aerial view of Al Egla in 2010, separated from West Bay Lagoon on the far left by Golf Course Street

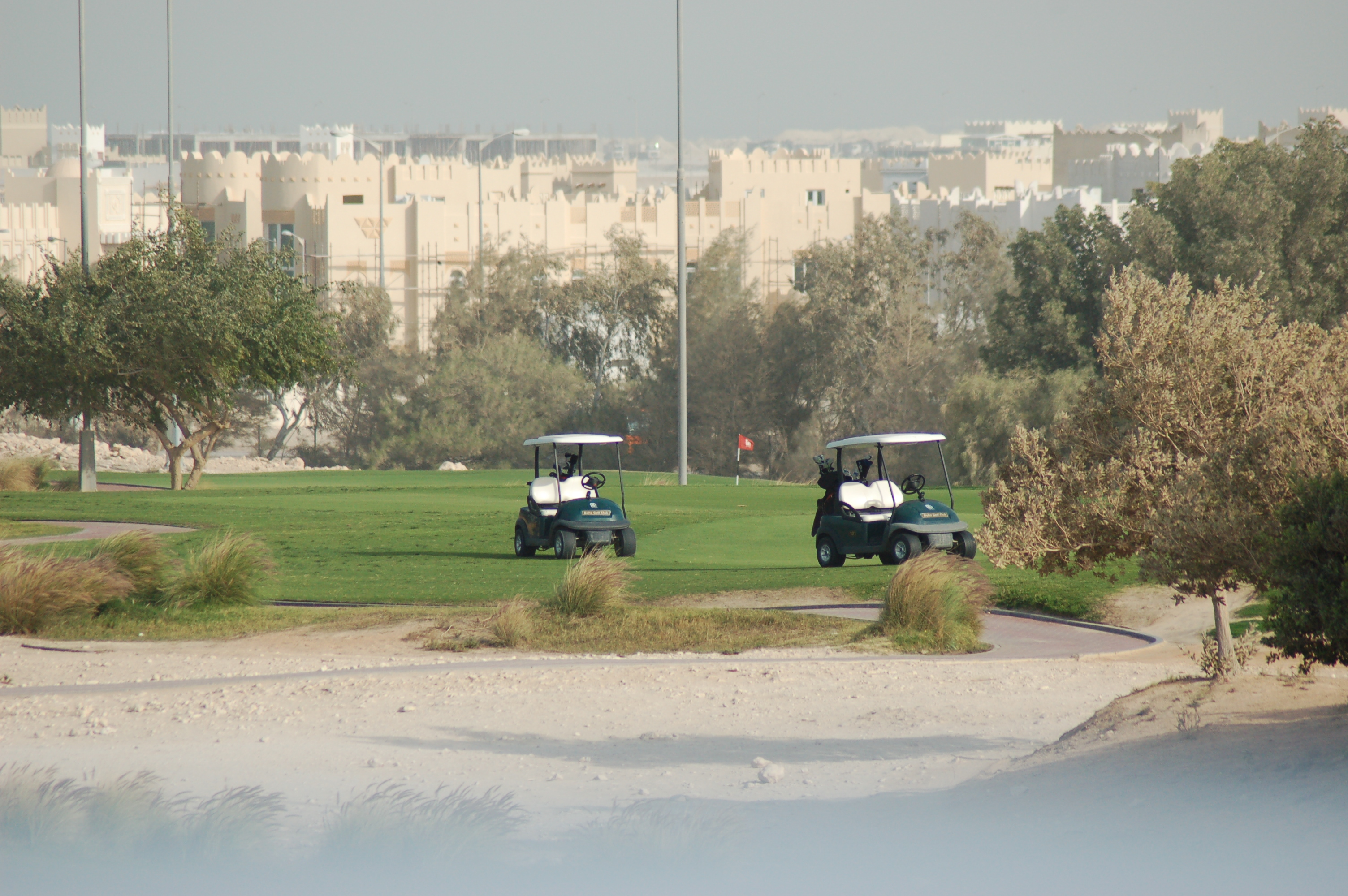
View of the golf course at Doha Golf Club

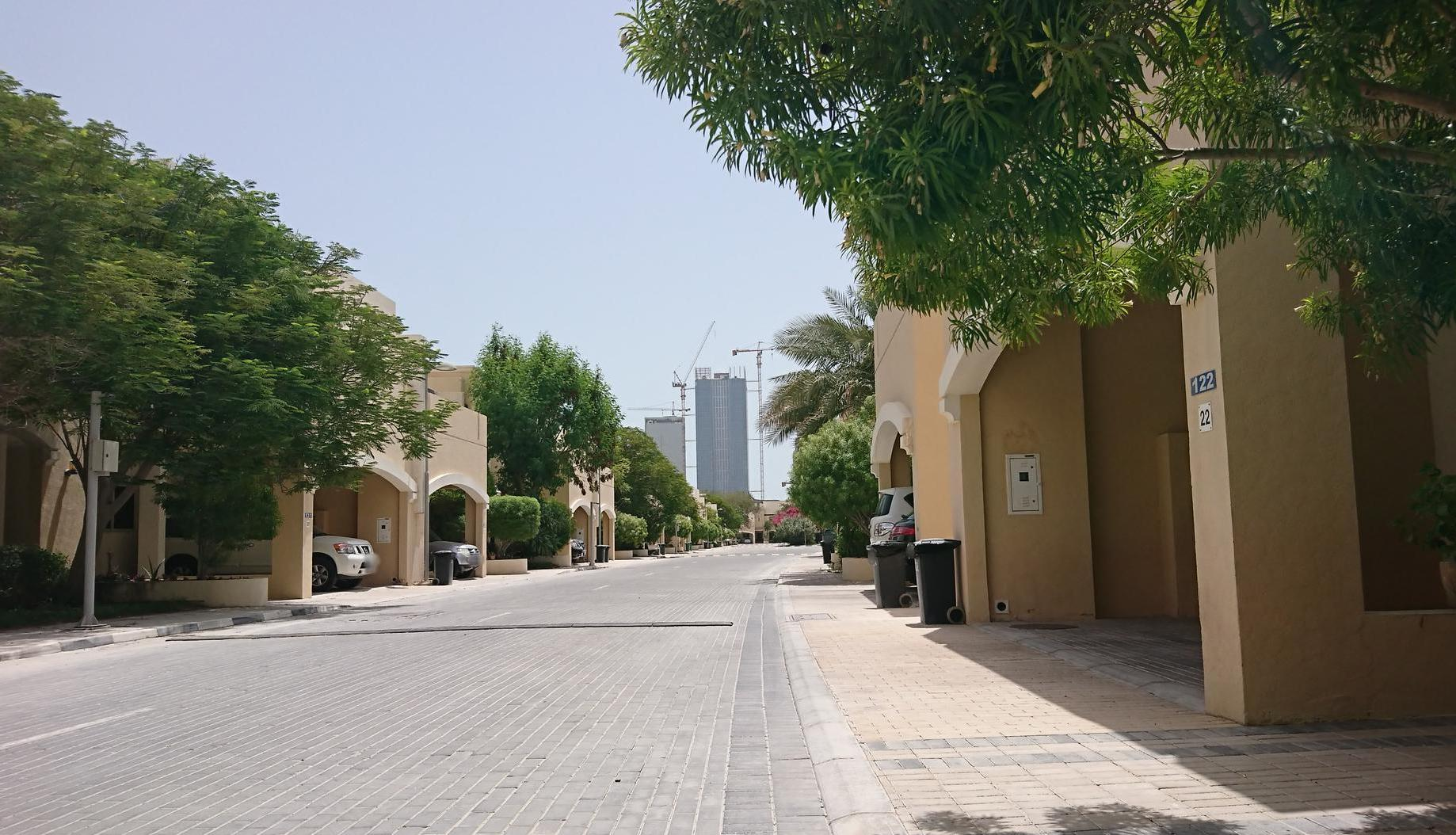
The Egla Gardens Compound in Al Egla

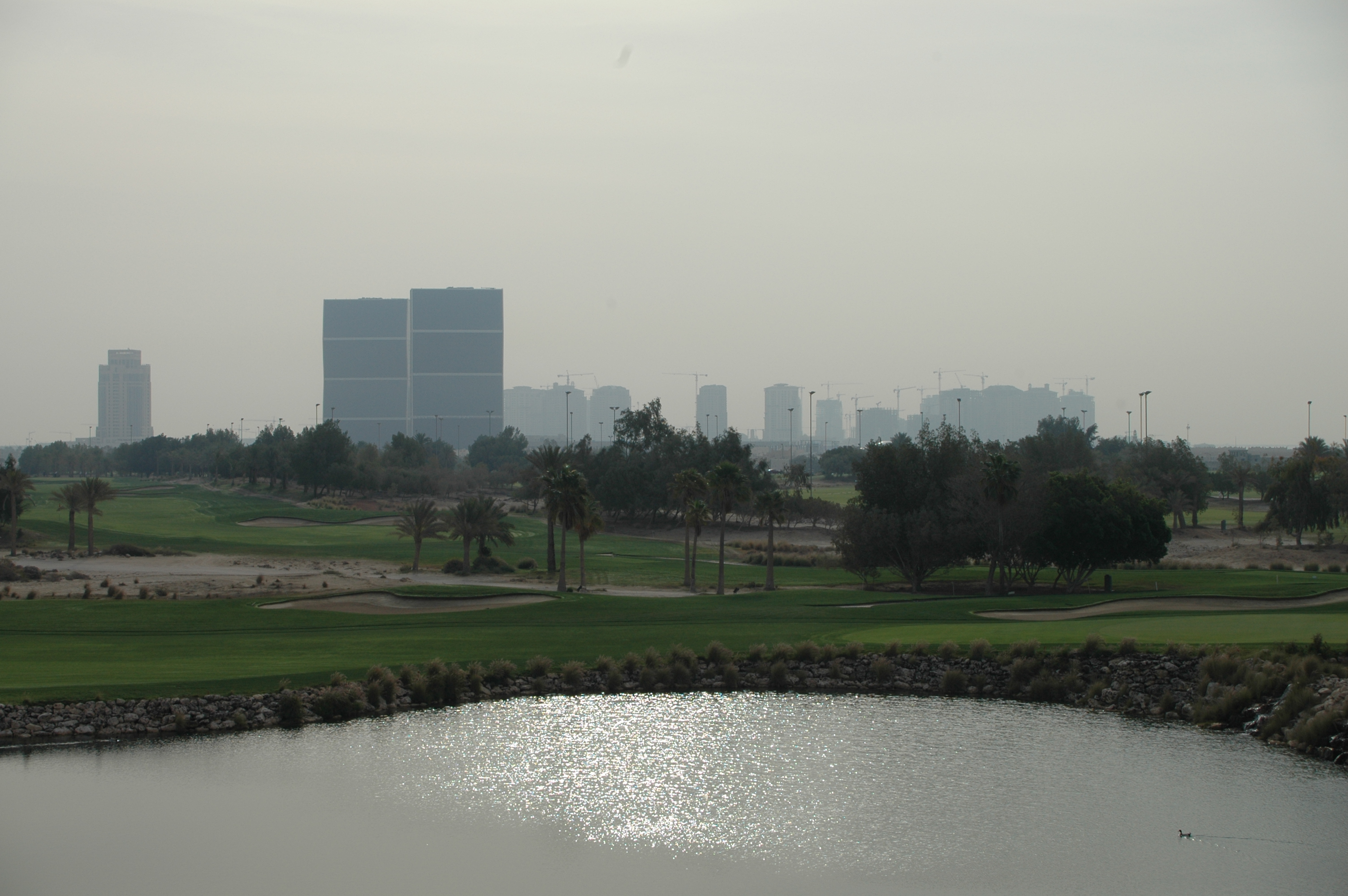
Panoramic view of Doha Golf Club in Al Egla
