= Lusail University =

University in Lusail, Qatar

- جامعة لوسيل
- Type: Private
- Established: April 29, 2020; 6 years ago
- Provost: Nitham Hindi
- Academic staff: 73
- Location: Zone 69, Qatar, Lusail, Qatar; 25°24′8.3″N 51°30′46.2″E
- Website: www.lu.edu.qa

Lusail University (Arabic: جَامِعَة لُوسَيْل, ALA-LC: Jāmiʻat Lūsayl) is a private university in Lusail, Qatar. It is the first national private university in Qatar.

== History ==
Lusail University was officially inaugurated on April 29, 2020. Former Attorney General of Qatar Ali Bin Fetais Al-Marri is the chairman of the university's board of trustees.

In October 2020, Lusail University signed an MoU (memorandum of understanding) with Qatar University to collaborate on academic, scientific, and organizational projects going forward. In November 2020, Lusail University held an event featuring a talk by Tunisian President Kais Saied. In December 2020, Lusail University signed an agreement with Qatar Charity (QC) to collaborate on research, education, and training for fulfilling humanitarian needs.

In 2021, the Turkish government sent a delegation of Turkish students to Lusail University on scholarships to learn how to communicate in Arabic and to bolster relations between Qatar and Turkey. In June 2021, the Qatar Fund for Development (QFFD) also signed an agreement to cover tuition costs for a select number of international students attending Lusail University as undergraduate students.

== Academics ==
Undergraduate Programs
College	Programme	Language of Instruction	Credit Hours
College of Commerce and Business	Bachelor of Business Administration - Major in Innovation and Entrepreneurship	Arabic	120
College of Commerce and Business	Bachelor of Business Administration - Major in Insurance and Risk Management	Arabic	120
College of Commerce and Business	Bachelor of Business Administration - Major in Supply Chain Management	Arabic	120
College of Commerce and Business	Bachelor of Business Administration - Major in Supply Chain Management	English	120
College of Commerce and Business	Bachelor of Business Administration - Major in Human Resources Management	Arabic	120
College of Commerce and Business	Bachelor of Business Administration - Major in Marketing	Arabic	120
College of Commerce and Business	Bachelor of Business Administration - Major in Management	Arabic	120
College of Education and Arts	Bachelor of Education – Major in Counselling and Mental Health	Arabic	120
College of Education and Arts	Bachelor of Education – Major in Teaching English Language	English	120
College of Education and Arts	Bachelor of Arts – Major in Political Science	Arabic	120
College of Law	Bachelor of Law	Arabic	120
College of Law	Bachelor of Law from Paris 1 Panthéon-Sorbonne University	French	120
College of Information Technology	Bachelor of Science in Information Technology - Major in Cybersecurity	English	120
College of Information Technology	Bachelor of Science in Information Technology - Major in Artificial Intelligence	English	120
College of Information Technology	Bachelor of Science in Information Technology - Major in Digital Game Design and Development	English	120

Postgraduate programs
College	Programme	Language of Instruction	Credit Hours
College of Commerce and Business	Master of Science in Digital Marketing	Arabic	36
College of Education and Arts	Master of Arts in International Affairs and Public Policy in cooperation with the United Nations Institute for Training and Research (UNITAR)	Arabic	36
College of Education and Arts	Master of Arts in TESOL and Applied Linguistics	English	30
College of Law	Master of Science in International Criminal Justice in partnership with the United Nations Office on Drugs and Crime (UNODC)	Arabic	36

The university used to offer programs such as Business Administration and Marketing and Distribution Techniques, French Studies, and Public Law and Private Law. Certain programs and courses were offered in cooperation with the University of Hassan II Casablanca Morocco, the University of Jordan, and Sussex University in the United Kingdom.

Lusail University is accredited by the Qatar Ministry of Higher Education.

== Admissions ==
Lusail University's admissions policy requires students to score 65% or higher in high school or its equivalent and to pass English language tests for admission to its English programs. If a student has a GPA lower than 65% but no less than 50%, they can also take a placement test for admission to the university.

Lusail University also offers grants to high school students who have excelled in secondary school academics or sports, students who have excelled in business, and students with special needs.

== See also ==
- List of universities and colleges in Qatar
