= Texas A&M University at Qatar =

Branch campus in Education City, Al Rayyan, Qatar

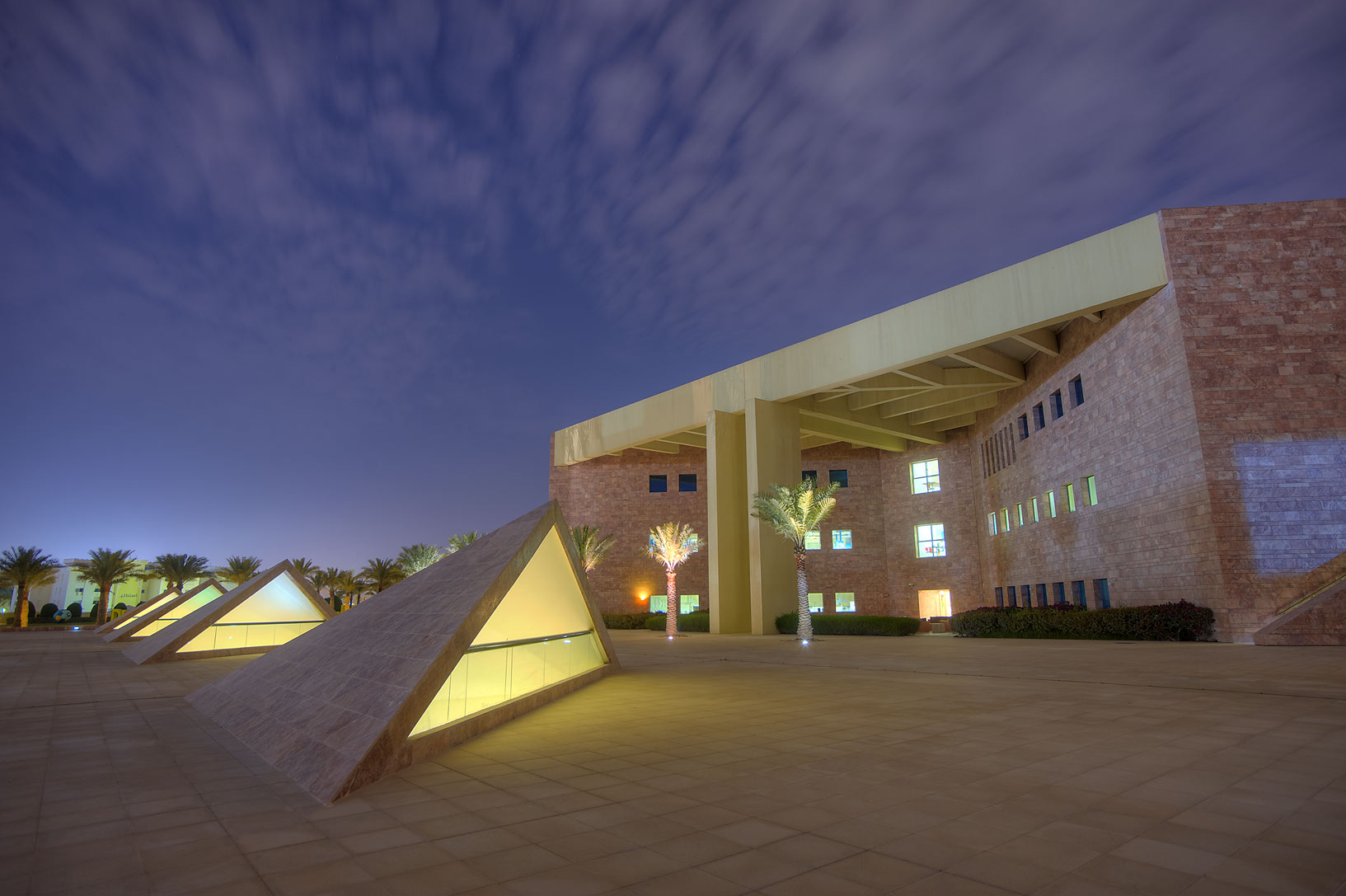
- Type: State university Branch of Texas A&M University
- Established: 2003; 23 years ago
- Academic affiliations: AAU
- Endowment: $5.6 billion (Systemwide)
- Chancellor: Glenn Hegar
- President: Tommy Williams (interim)
- Provost: Alan Sams
- Dean: César O. Malavé
- Students: 844 (fall 2023)
- Undergraduates: 632 (fall 2023)
- Postgraduates: 127 (fall 2022)
- Doctoral students: 0 (fall 2015)
- Location: Education City, Al Rayyan, Qatar; 25.3148°N 51.4394°E
- Campus: Multi-versity Education City, 2,400 acres (9.7 km^{2})
- Colors: Maroon and white
- Nickname: Aggies
- Mascot: Reveille X
- Website: www.qatar.tamu.edu

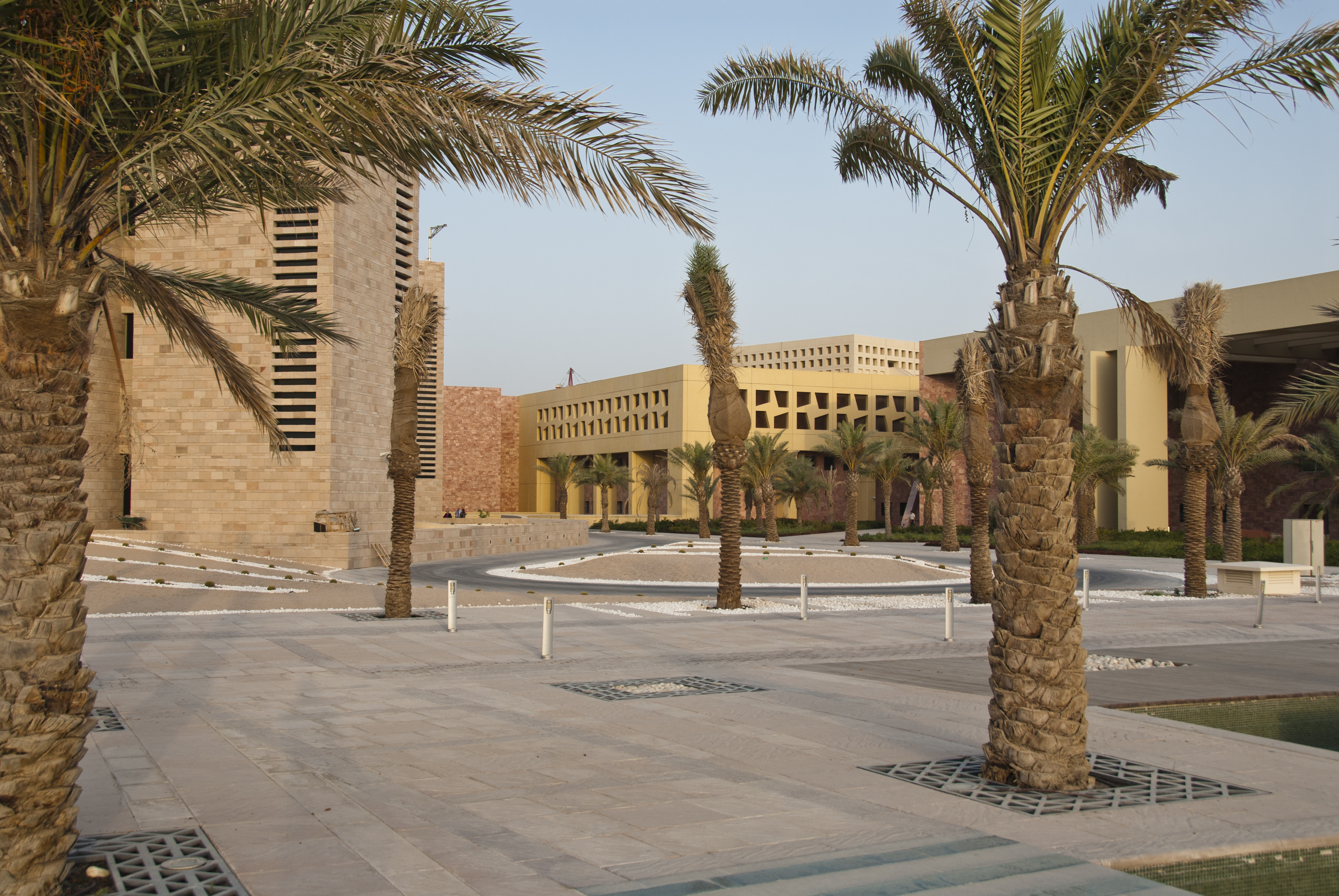
Texas A&M University at Qatar

Texas A&M University at Qatar (TAMUQ) is a branch of Texas A&M University located in Education City, Al Rayyan, Qatar. The university was established in 2003, and is slated to close by 2028.

The university offers undergraduate degrees in chemical, electrical, mechanical, and petroleum engineering. A graduate program for chemical engineering (master's degree) commenced in 2011.

== History ==
Texas A&M University's campus in Qatar was established in 2003. The campus was set up through an agreement between Texas A&M and the Qatar Foundation for Education, Science, and Community Development, a private institution under the laws of the State of Qatar. The Qatar Foundation was started by then-Emir Shiekh Hamad bin Khalifa Al Thani and his wife and mother of the current Emir Sheikha Moza bint Nasser. The campus was opened as part of Qatar's "massive venture to import elite higher education from the United States to Doha using the oil and natural-gas riches of the tiny Persian Gulf nation". Since 2003, there have been over 1,000 graduates.

The original agreement was for undergraduate programs in chemical, electrical, mechanical, and petroleum engineering. In 2010, an additional agreement established a graduate-studies program in engineering. In 2011, a third agreement established a research program. The two initial agreements ended in June 2013, and in January 2014, a renewal agreement was signed for a period of 10 years.

In February 2024, the Texas A&M University Board of Regents voted to close the Qatar campus in a multi-year shut down process. The campus is to close by 2028.

== Academics ==
Two professors, a graduate, and an undergraduate student at the TAMUQ branch campus

According to the agreement between Qatar and TAMU, the curriculum at the Education City campus will "duplicate as closely as possible" the curriculum at TAMU's main campus. Questions have arisen over whether schools such as TAMUQ in Education City are truly able to grant students the same freedom of thought, expression, and association as is available to students at the U.S. campuses due to Qatar's much stricter laws that inhibit these freedoms.

== Administration ==
The 2014 agreement states that TAMU and TAMUQ are responsible for selecting and supervising all faculty and staff, admitting, enrolling, and instructing students, developing plans to ensure the university satisfies the terms of the agreement, and designing and implementing the school's academic curricula and programs.

The Qatar Foundation and TAMU established a Joint Advisory Board to oversee TAMUQ. Three members are appointed by each TAMU and the Qatar Foundation, and three members are jointly appointed by both sides. The board provides advice to the Dean of TAMUQ, reviews the budget, and conducts ongoing review and evaluation of the success of TAMUQ.

=== Funding ===
Texas A&M receives more than $76.2 million each year to operate its campus in Qatar. The Qatar Foundation purchases and owns all property, pays salaries, and reimburses expenses to Texas A&M for its campus in Education City. In addition, TAMU earns a management fee that is inclusive of all of its costs and fees for establishing, managing, and operating TAMUQ. In the budgets approved for FY2014 and proposed for FY2015-2018, TAMU's management fee is $8.2 million.

Tuition at the university is $28,900 for undergraduates. The agreement between the two parties stated that "the tuition and fees for students at TAMUQ shall be no less than the highest rates applicable to out-of-state students at TAMU's main campus". The Qatar Foundation is responsible for collecting all tuition paid by students.

According to the agreement, the Qatar Foundation is responsible for all financial aid awarded to international, non-U.S. citizen undergraduate students at TAMUQ. For graduate students, the Qatar Foundation will provide limited financial assistance to Qatari students who are not otherwise funded, but is not required to provide assistance to non-Qatari students, although it may do so on a case-by-case basis.

The endowment of the program is owned by the Qatar Foundation and managed on behalf of the program unless a donor specifies that it should be otherwise managed. Property or equipment purchased by the Qatar Foundation or acquired through a gift to the Qatar Foundation are property of the foundation. Anything acquired through a gift to TAMU or TAMUQ will be property of TAMU.

Texas A&M at Qatar also allows students the opportunity to participate in sports such as basketball and soccer. In the 2008 and 2009 seasons, the men's basketball team completed a historic run where they went undefeated for 46 straight games.

== Undergraduate admissions ==
Texas A&M University at Qatar follows the same admissions standards in place at the home campus in College Station, Texas.

Texas A&M University has a research collaboration with Habib University in Pakistan.

TAMU agreed that the undergraduate population of its campus in Doha would be 70% Qatari citizens. Almost 50% of TAMUQ's students are women, a much higher percentage than in most engineering programs.

== See also ==
- List of universities and colleges in Qatar
