= List of universities and colleges in Qatar =

This is a list of universities, colleges and branch campuses of foreign universities in Qatar.

== Qatari institutions ==
- University of Doha for Science & Technology
- Community College of Qatar
- Doha Institute for Graduate Studies
- Lusail University
- Qatar Aeronautical College
- Qatar University
- Hamad bin Khalifa University
- University Foundation College

== Foreign university campuses ==
- National University of Malaysia (UKM Qatar)
- University of Aberdeen
- Arkansas State University
- Northumbria University
- Academic Bridge Programme
- Carnegie Mellon University in Qatar
- Georgetown University School of Foreign Service in Qatar
- HEC Paris in Qatar
- Northwestern University in Qatar
- Stenden University Qatar
- Syscoms Institute
- Virginia Commonwealth University School of the Arts in Qatar
- Weill Cornell Medical College in Qatar
- City University Qatar
- MIE-SPPU Institute of Higher Education (Savitribai Phule Pune University's Qatar Campus)
- OUC, Qatar

== Universities which are no longer/planned to cease operations ==
- University of Calgary (2006–2025)
- Texas A&M University at Qatar (2003–2028)
