= Place Vendôme Mall =

Coordinates: 25°24′16.8″N 51°31′13.6″E

- بلاس فاندوم مول
- Location: Lusail, Qatar
- Opened: 15 April 2022; 4 years ago
- Developer: United Developers
- Owner: United Developers
- Architect: Arab Engineering Bureau (AEB)
- Num. of stores: 580
- Floor area: 230,000 square metres (2,500,000 sq ft)
- Floors: 5
- Parking: Multi-storey car park
- Website: Placevendomeqatar.com

Place Vendôme Mall (Arabic: بلاس فاندوم مول) is a shopping mall in Lusail, Qatar. It is a luxury mall built at a cost of $1.3bn and opened in 2022. It was built with inspiration from French architecture and has shops, restaurants, and cafes. It is a 1,150,000 square meter mall and is a four-floored, open concept mall having 580+ high-end and mid-range stores. The complex also has a 3D water fountain. It is one of the largest shopping malls in Qatar and forms part of the Lusail Entertainment City development in Qatar.

== History ==
Construction of Place Vendôme Mall began on 17 March 2014, and the mall officially opened on 15 April 2022. Construction of the development took approximately eight years to complete. The developer is United Developers, a consortium of four Qatari investors. The project was developed at a cost of approximately $1.3 billion

The mall was developed by United Developers, a Qatari real estate company. Construction formed part of the broader urban development of Lusail, a planned city north of Doha intended to serve as a major residential, commercial, and tourism hub. The project was completed in phases, with initial openings taking place in 2022.

The mall recorded 16.5 million visitors in 2024, a 64 percent increase from 2023. In the first quarter of 2025, 18 new leasing deals were signed, 5,112 square meters of space were added, and new tenants were added to the complex.

Since its opening in 2022, Place Vendôme Mall has become a major retail and tourism destination within Lusail and the wider Doha metropolitan area. The development contributes to Qatar’s strategy of expanding its non-hydrocarbon economy, particularly in retail, hospitality, and tourism sectors. Its mix of luxury and mid-market brands attracts both international visitors and local residents, reinforcing Lusail’s role as an emerging urban and commercial hub.

== Architecture and design ==
The design of the mall was inspired by French architecture adapted to the Gulf context. The total built-up area is about 1,150,000 square meters. The development includes approximately 200,000 to 230,000 square meters of retail floor space within the complex.

The project was designed by the Arab Engineering Bureau, a Qatar-based architectural and engineering consultancy. The name of the mall is taken from Place Vendôme in Paris, and the atrium was influenced by the Grand Palais in Paris. The development also incorporates an outdoor plaza with an artificial canal and fountain installations running through parts of the complex.

The design of the mall draws inspiration from the historic Place Vendôme in Paris, incorporating classical French architectural elements such as symmetrical façades, arcades, and ornamental detailing. The complex consists of multiple interconnected buildings arranged around open-air courtyards and a central plaza, combining indoor retail areas with outdoor promenades.

A choreographed fountain is located at the center of the mall complex. The installation features synchronized water jets, lighting, and music, and serves as a focal point for public gatherings and events.

== Sustainability ==
The mall has a pneumatic waste collection system. The system uses 3 kilometers of underground pipes and has 39 inlets for waste collection. It handles about 10 tonnes of waste daily and separates recyclable and general waste.

== Facilities ==
The complex contains two hotels, Le Royal Méridien and Palais Vendôme. It also includes Le Royal Méridien Residences. The hotels and residences are operated by Marriott International. The site includes serviced apartments and entertainment areas. The development forms part of a mixed-use complex that includes retail, hospitality, residential and entertainment components.

== Retail ==
The mall comprises a mix of luxury, premium, and mid-market retail outlets. Its tenant composition includes international fashion brands, jewellery retailers, department stores, and food and beverage establishments. In addition to retail units, the complex contains entertainment venues and leisure facilities intended to serve both residents of Lusail and visitors from the wider Doha metropolitan area.

The mall has over 500 retail outlets with brands including Dolce & Gabbana Beauty, Birkentsock, New Balance, URTH Cafe, Bursa Kebap, Evi, Joe & The Juice, Ray Ban and Hour Choice.

== Accessibility and capacity ==
It is located in the Lusail Entertainment City district of Lusail, north of Doha. The mall can accommodate up to 100,000 visitors daily. It has 7,000 parking spaces. The site is about 11 kilometers from central Doha. Transport access includes roads, the Doha Metro Red Line, the Lusail Tram, buses, water taxis and pedestrian links.

== Awards ==
In 2024, the mall won the 'Premier Shopping Mall Experience' award at the Qatar Tourism Awards. In 2023, it received the UNESCO Prix Versailles—World's Most Beautiful Shopping Mall 2023. It has also received the Qatar Museums Bronze Key award, the RLI MENA 'Shopping Center – New Build' award, Shop Qatar's 'Best Mall Award' and 'Highest Participation Award' in 2024.
