= Lusail =

City in Qatar

Lusail لوسيل
- City
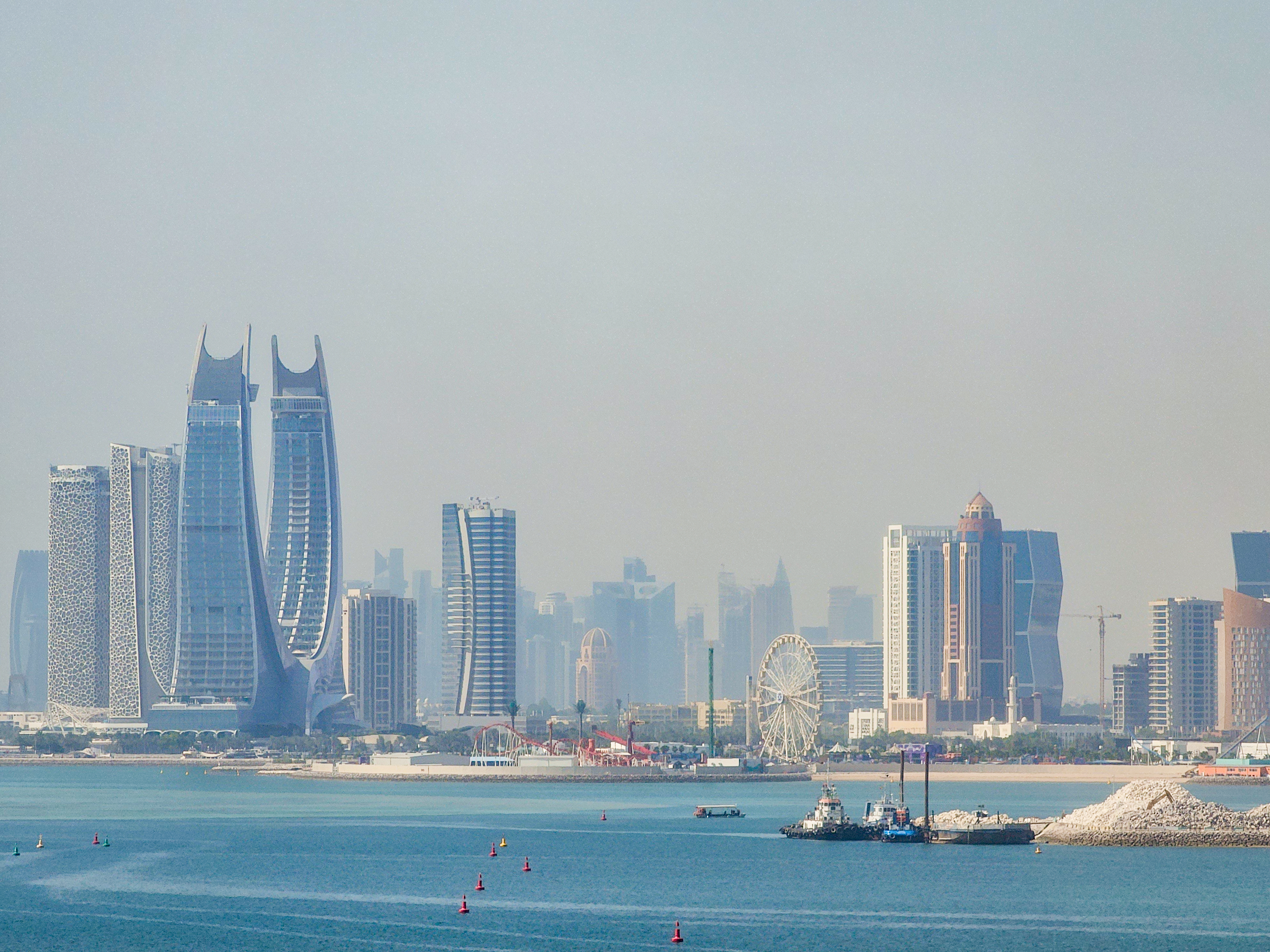
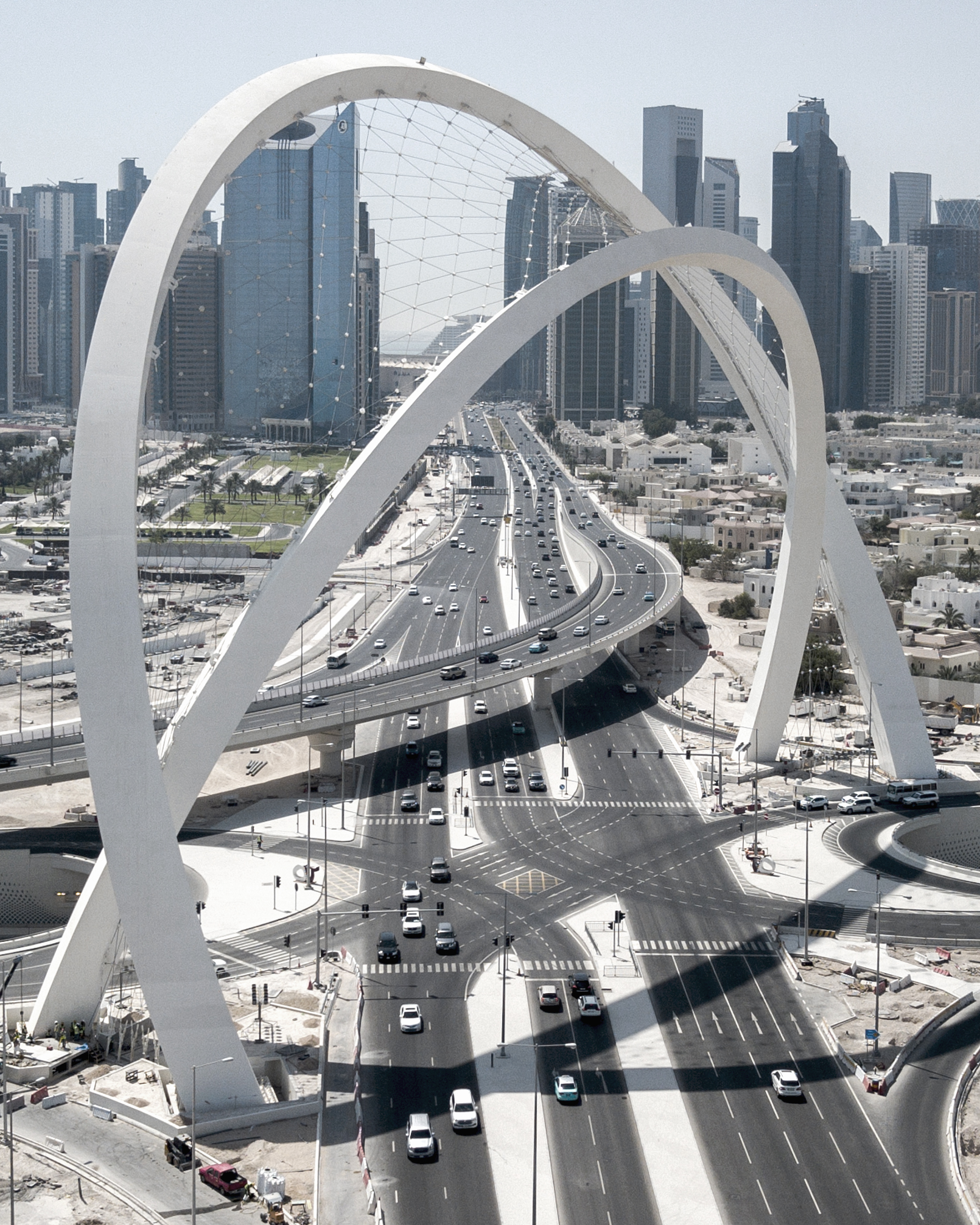
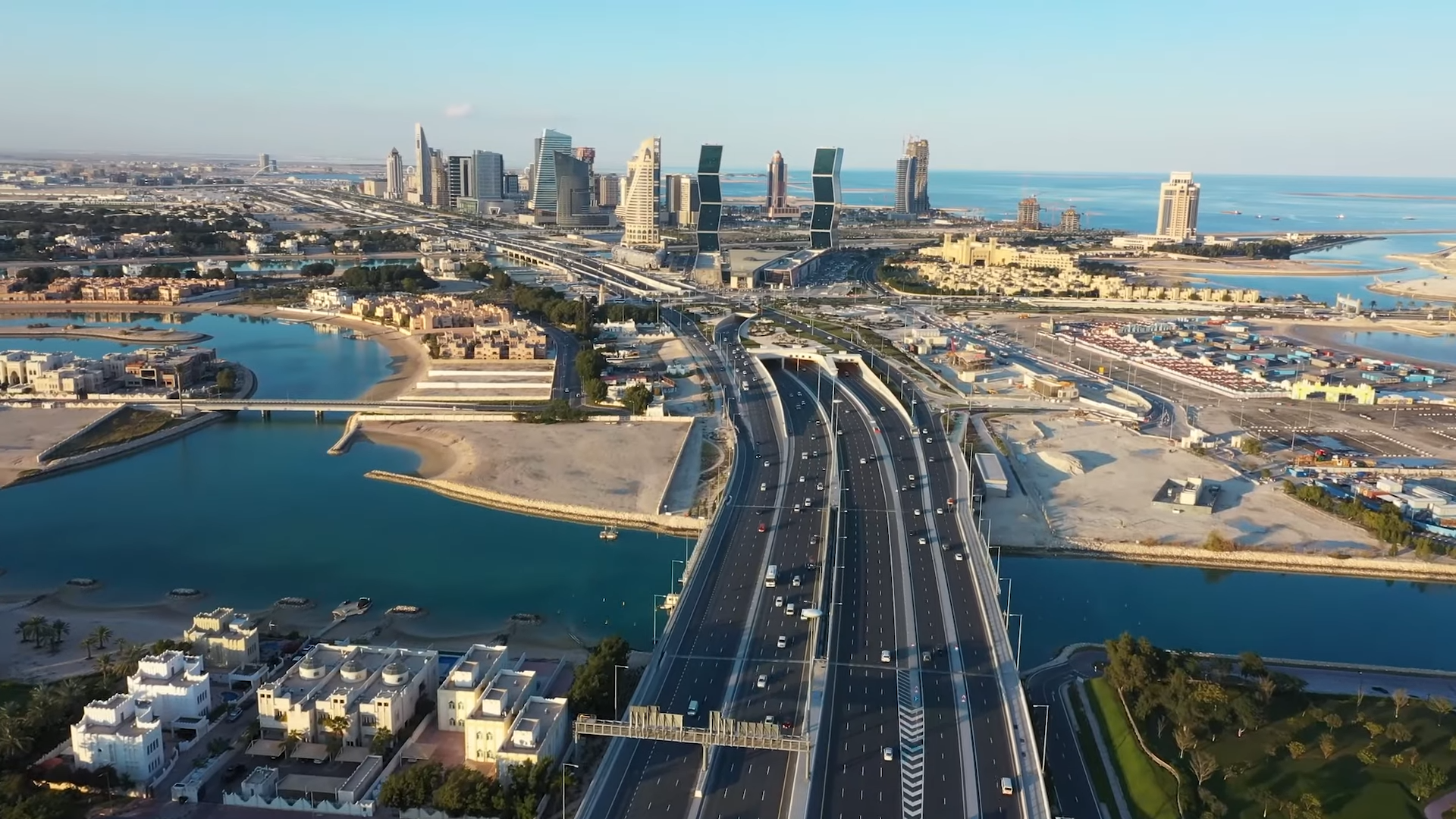
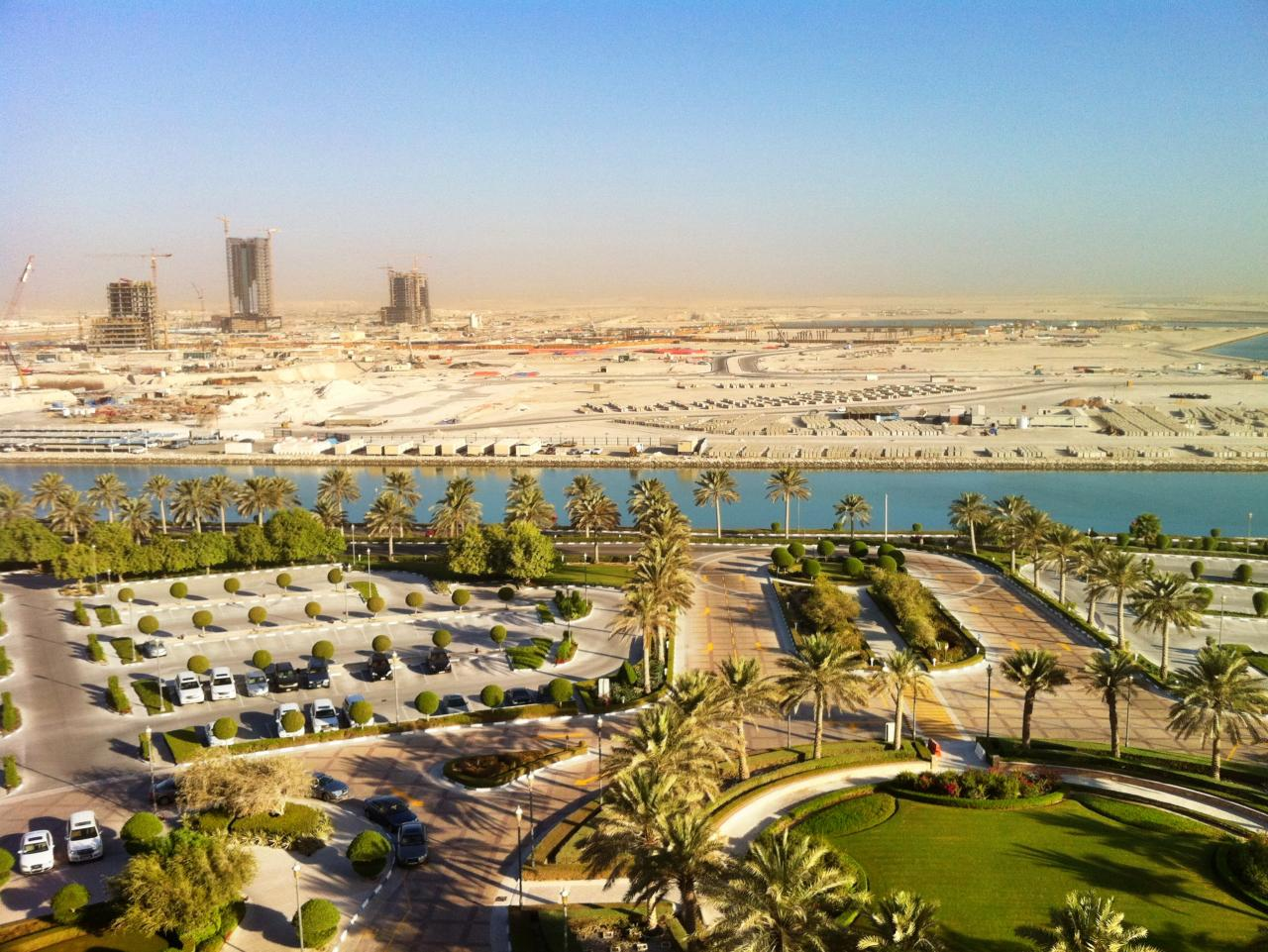
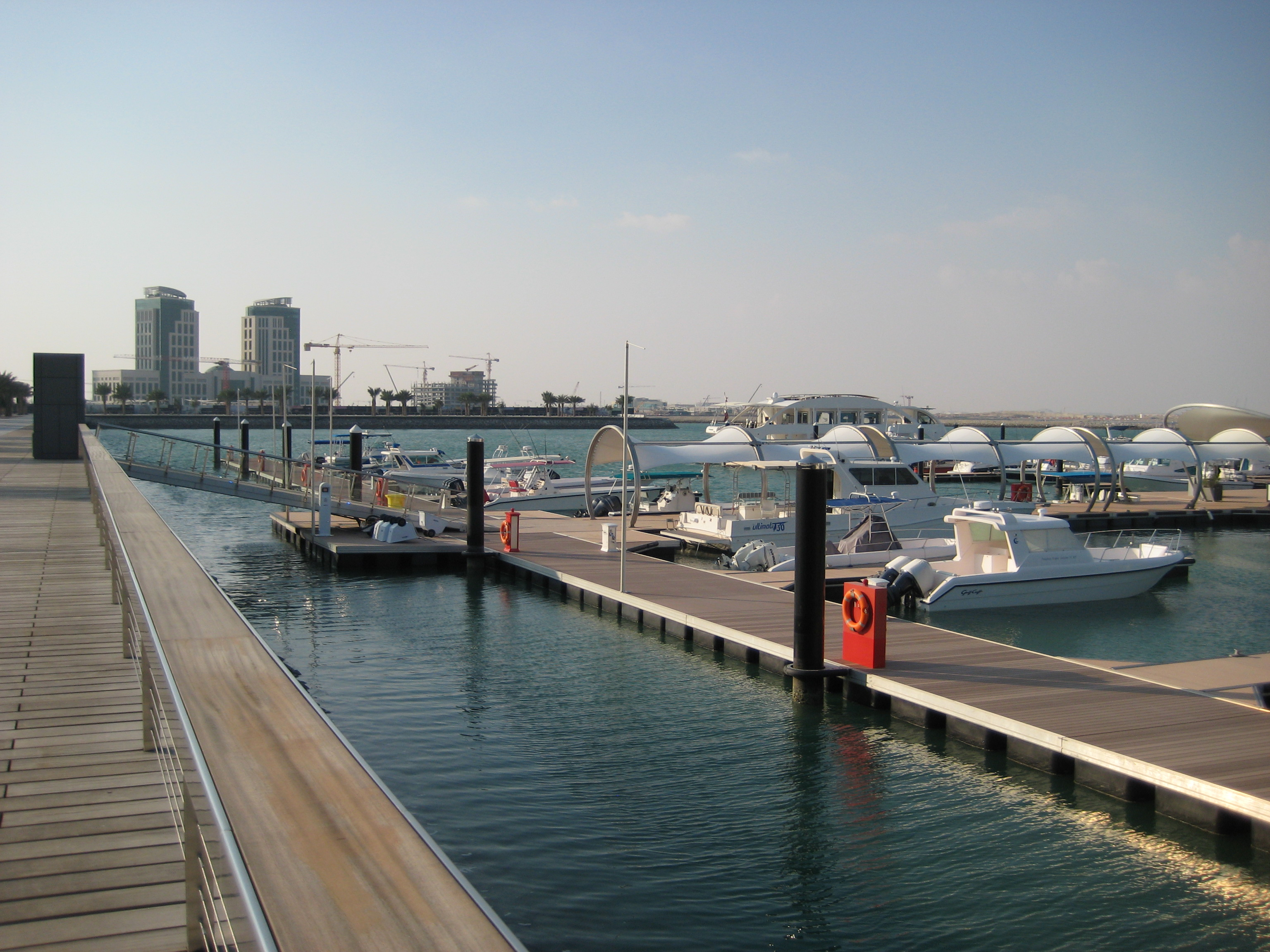
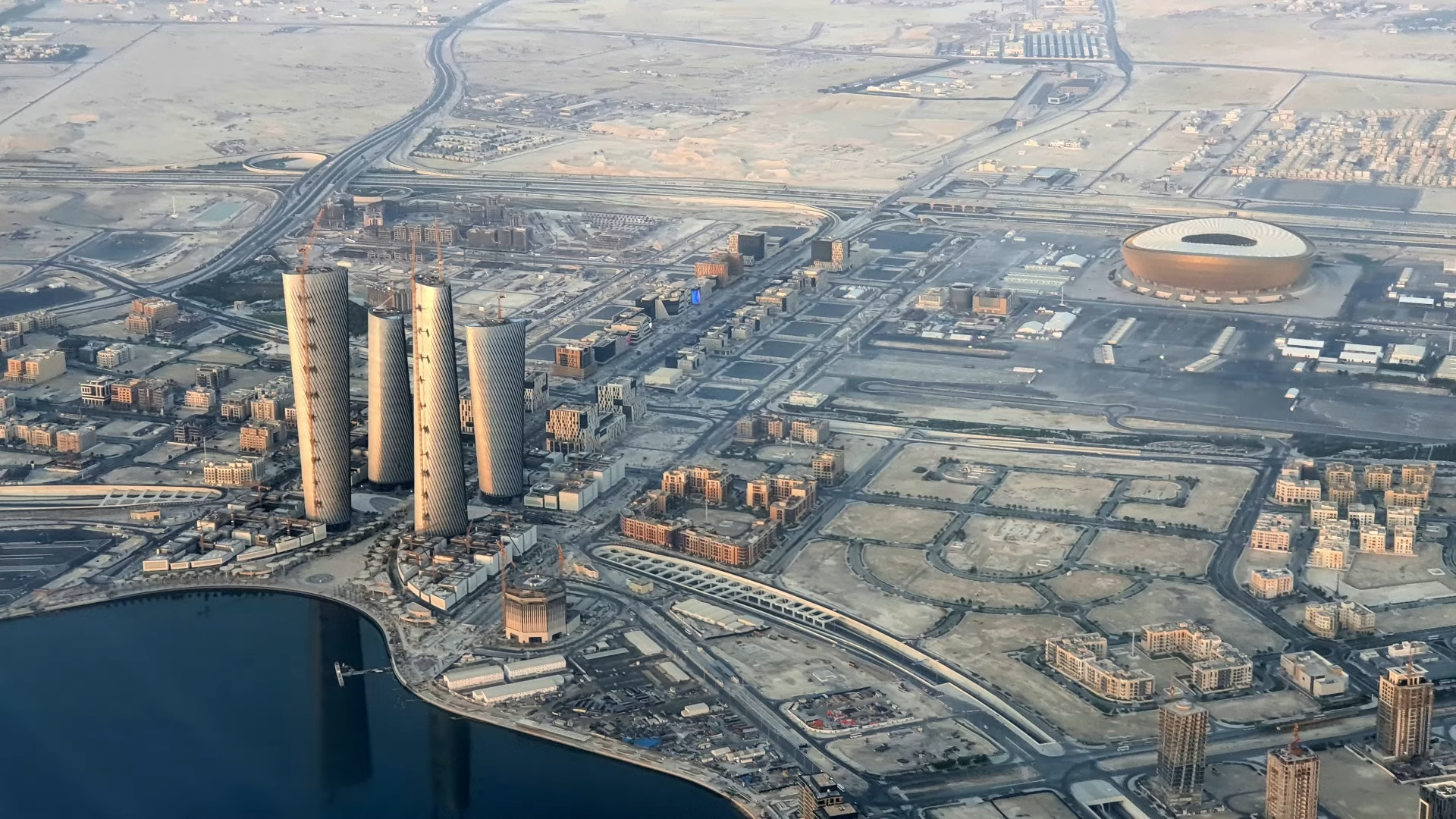
- Skyline of Lusail Al Wahda Arches Lusail Expressway to Doha City construction, 2011 Lusail marina Lusail Plaza Towers and Stadium

- Location within Qatar Location within Middle East Location within Asia
- Coordinates: 25°25′03″N 51°30′27″E
- Country: Qatar
- Municipality: Al Daayen
- Zone: Zone 69, Zone 70
- District no.: 123

Area
  - Total: 38 km^{2} (15 sq mi)
- Elevation: 5 m (16 ft)

Population (2022)
  - Total: 198,600
  - Density: 5,200/km^{2} (14,000/sq mi)
- Website: Lusail.com

Lusail (Arabic: لوسيل, ALA-LC: Lūsayl, Arabic pronunciation: [luːˈsajl]) is the third-largest city in Qatar after Doha and Al-Rayyan, and serves as an important economic hub. Located on the coast in the southern part of the municipality of Al Daayen, it lies about 23 kilometres (14 mi) north of the Doha city centre, just north of the West Bay Lagoon, covering over 38 square kilometres (15 sq mi). Various development projects are planned. Development is being carried out by the state-controlled developer Qatari Diar along with Parsons Corporation and Dorsch-Gruppe.

Lusail Stadium was one of the venues for the 2022 FIFA World Cup, and hosted the final. It is also the site of a Formula One race track where the first Qatar Grand Prix was held in 2021.

== Etymology ==
Lusail's name is derived from "al wassail," a plant that grows bountifully in the area.

== History ==
=== 20th century ===
In 1908, J. G. Lorimer recorded Lusail in his Gazetteer of the Persian Gulf. He wrote:

A village on the east coast of Qatar about 15 miles north of Dohah: the principal residence at the present time of Shaikh Jasim, the head of the Al Thani family of Qatar. About 500 yards inland of the place is Jabal Lusail, a rocky hillock of some height which forms a landmark well known to mariners. On the summit of Jabal Lusail is a double-storeyed tower visible from several miles inland; and at the foot of the hill are three wells, one on the north and two on the west side; the water of these is extremely brackish. The village of Lusail consists of about 50 substantial stone and mud houses of Hamaidat and 2 or 3 of Ma'adhid, the latter being personal retainers of the Shaikh. To the village belong 9 pearl boats, 2 other sea-going vessels, and 3 fishing boats. Animals of transport are 20 horses and 70 camels. The house of the Shaikh stands about 200 yards to the south of the village: it was built about 1901 and is a four-sided, high-walled building of stone and plaster, adjoined by a few yards and out-houses and by a small mosque. It is called a fort, but it contains no guns.

In an earlier 1904 transcript of Lorimer's Gazetteer, he remarks that Sheikh Jassim first settled in Lusail in 1903 with a few allied tribes. Sheikh Jassim died and was buried in Lusail in July 1913. His base of operations, known as the "Founder's Fort,"' is recognized as a cultural icon of Qatar.

Historic evidence of the practice of date syrup manufacturing using a traditional date press called madbasa has been found in Lusail. While many of these presses have been abandoned or destroyed over the years, a remaining installation can be observed at the historic residence of Sheikh Jassim.

=== 21st century ===
Plans for the development of Lusail City were first announced in 2005. After a cabinet resolution was passed in 2002, Lusail along with its suburbs of Al Kharayej and Jabal Thuaileb became the first areas of Qatar where foreigners could own real estate. In December 2013, Qatari Diar announced that more than 80% of the plots in Lusail have been purchased. It was stated in April 2018 that over 80% of the city's infrastructure projects were completed.

On 26 November 2022, during the 2022 FIFA World Cup, a large fire broke out in a building under construction near Qetaifan Island North about 3.5 km away from Lusail Stadium where multiple World Cup games were scheduled to occur. The Civil Defense controlled the fires in three warehouses and no injuries or casualties were sustained.

In March 2023, the United Nations House at Lusail was opened. As the main representative office of the United Nations in the country, it will serve to improve the partnership between the Qatari government and the UN.

== Geography ==
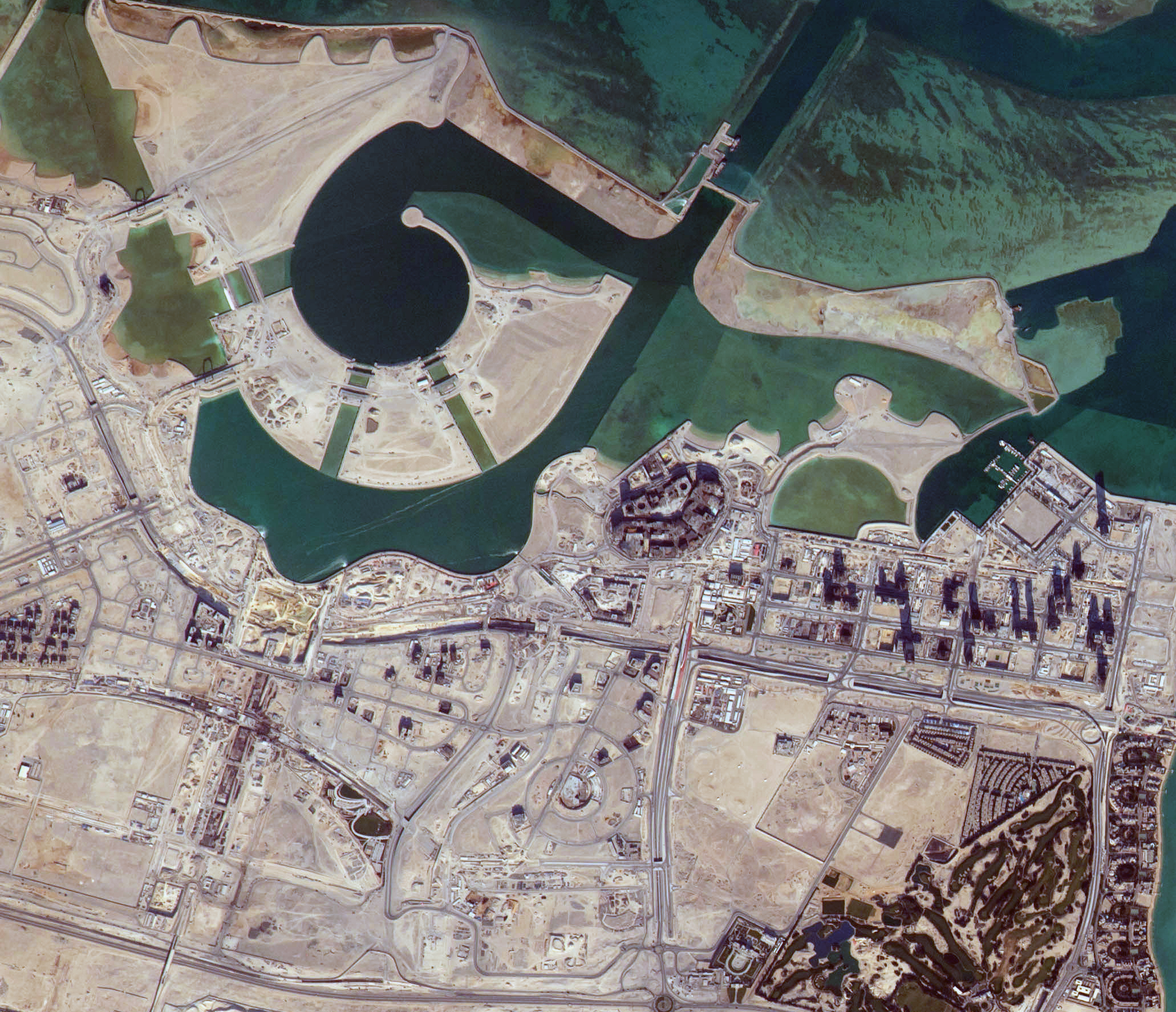
Satellite view of Lusail and Al Egla

Boundaries of the city run from the Persian Gulf in the east, to the Al Khor Coastal Road in the west, and for roughly 7 km (4.3 mi) north of the Ritz Carlton Hotel in Doha. Not included in city boundaries is the district of Al Egla which hosts the Doha Golf Club.

Two nearby settlements to the south of the original town of Lusail, Al Kharayej and Jabal Thuaileb (Fox Hills), have been incorporated into Lusail as standalone districts. At the time the project was launched, these places were not inhabited. The only standing structures in the area were an Ooredoo station, a cement factory, and three farms, one of which was still in use. Youth would commonly use the area for recreational off-roading and on occasion, waste was dumped in its sabkhas (salt flats). Located to the north of the city are several abandoned fishing villages.

Groundwater quality in the area is poor. On the city's border with the Persian Gulf, the groundwater elevation is 1 meter above sea level and flows east-to-west. Salinity levels are highest on the eastern side, at 40 ppt, compared to a low of 18 ppt in the western section; these levels are too high for consumption or use in agriculture. Because of the groundwater's high salinity, only salt- and drought-tolerant plants grow in this area. A geographic survey found 25 species of plants within city limits; all of which are found abundantly elsewhere on the peninsula.

Except for dogs and camels kept on a local farm, no mammals were recorded in the area during the initial environmental impact assessment. However, several species of snakes and lizards were found, including the spiny-tailed lizard which is common to Qatar. Nine species of birds were found to occur in the area, particularly in its mudflats. Grass coverage in its mudflat area is less than 30%, with most grass being found in soils with the highest sand content.

== Districts ==
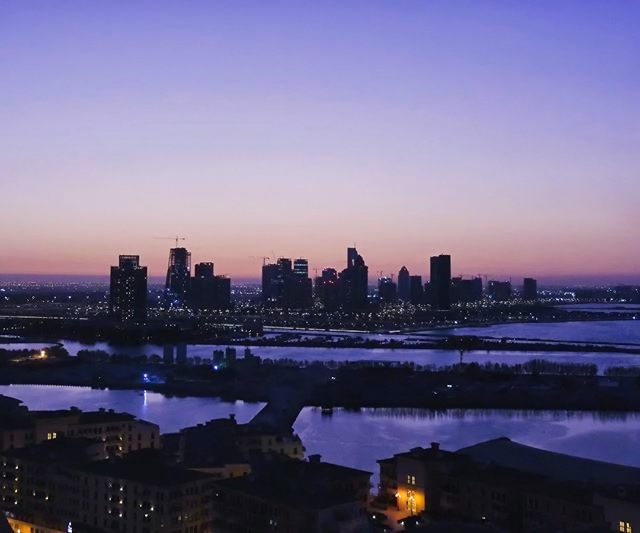
Skyline of Lusail's Fox Hills district

Lusail has 19 designated districts as part of the city's master plan. They are:

No.	District name	Area (ha.)	Population capacity	Expected res. population	Building density / height
1	Golf District	366	29,000	22,000	Low / 2–5 levels
2	North Residential District / Waterfront Residential District	126 / 52	7,100	5,400	Low / 2 levels
3	Al Kharayej Towers	29	11,000	10,500	Medium–high / 15–20 levels
4	Stadium District	100	86,250	N/A	N/A
5	Waterfront Residential District	53	19,000	17,000	Low–high / 20–36 levels
6	Energy City 1	72	25,000	Nil	Medium / 4 levels
7	Waterfront Commercial District	54	29,700	9,600	Medium–high / 3–15 levels
8	Fox Hills (Jabal Thuaileb)	168	50,000	38,600	Medium / 5–8 levels
9	Al Erkyah	26	12,000	10,600	Medium / 8–10 levels
10	Energy City 2	46	20,700	18,000	Medium / 5–7 levels
11	Entertainment City	98	32,400	8,400	Medium / 4–13 levels
12	Entertainment Island	23	4,200	N/A	Medium / 2–12 levels
13	Medical and Education District	164	N/A	N/A	N/A
14	Qatar Petroleum District	45	N/A	N/A	N/A
15	Marina District	188	103,900	31,000	High / 15–60 levels
16	Qetaifan Islands	256	37,500	22,000	Low / 2–4 levels
17	Boulevard Commercial	52	20,900	5,500	Low–medium / 3–6 levels
18	Lusail Plaza Towers	16	19,300	Nil	High / 55–80 levels
19	Huzoom Lusail	N/A	N/A	N/A	Low
Total		1,944	–		

=== Golf District ===
As its name suggests, the main attraction of the Golf District is its 18-hole golf course. Many high-end villas are situated within the golf course's vicinity. The city's education guidelines state that there will be one school occupying upwards of 55,000 m^{2} (590,000 sq ft) for kindergarten to secondary students.

=== Waterfront Residential District ===
High-rise housing units with a panoramic view of Lusail's coastline are under construction here. Two schools are planned for here.

=== Al Kharayej Towers ===
Originally a rural settlement on the outskirts of Doha, Al Kharayej has been reformed as a district of Lusail under the name Al Kharayej Towers. It is bounded by the Golf District and the Waterfront Residential District

=== Stadium District ===
Aerial view of the Stadium District at night

As a result of Qatar winning the hosting rights to the 2022 FIFA World Cup, it was decided that a massive stadium should be constructed in Lusail. The outcome was the Lusail Iconic Stadium, which hosted the 2022 FIFA World Cup Final game between Argentina and France. Sports fans are able to access the district through the Lusail Tram and the Doha Metro.

=== Energy City 1 ===
First launched in 2006, Energy City 1 is meant to be a major business hub for the country's oil and gas industry.

=== Fox Hills ===
Development of Fox Hills as a residential district was commenced in 2006.

In 2015, the community was said to accommodate 9,200 apartments ranging from 5 to 7 stories. Many of the buildings were constructed with traditional architectural elements in order to represent Qatari heritage. Most major infrastructure projects for electricity, water, and streets were completed in the same year.

Crescent Park and other parks are in this district. Three schools are planned for the northern section: a kindergarten, a primary school, and a secondary school. In the southern section, two schools are under construction.

=== Lusail Plaza Towers ===
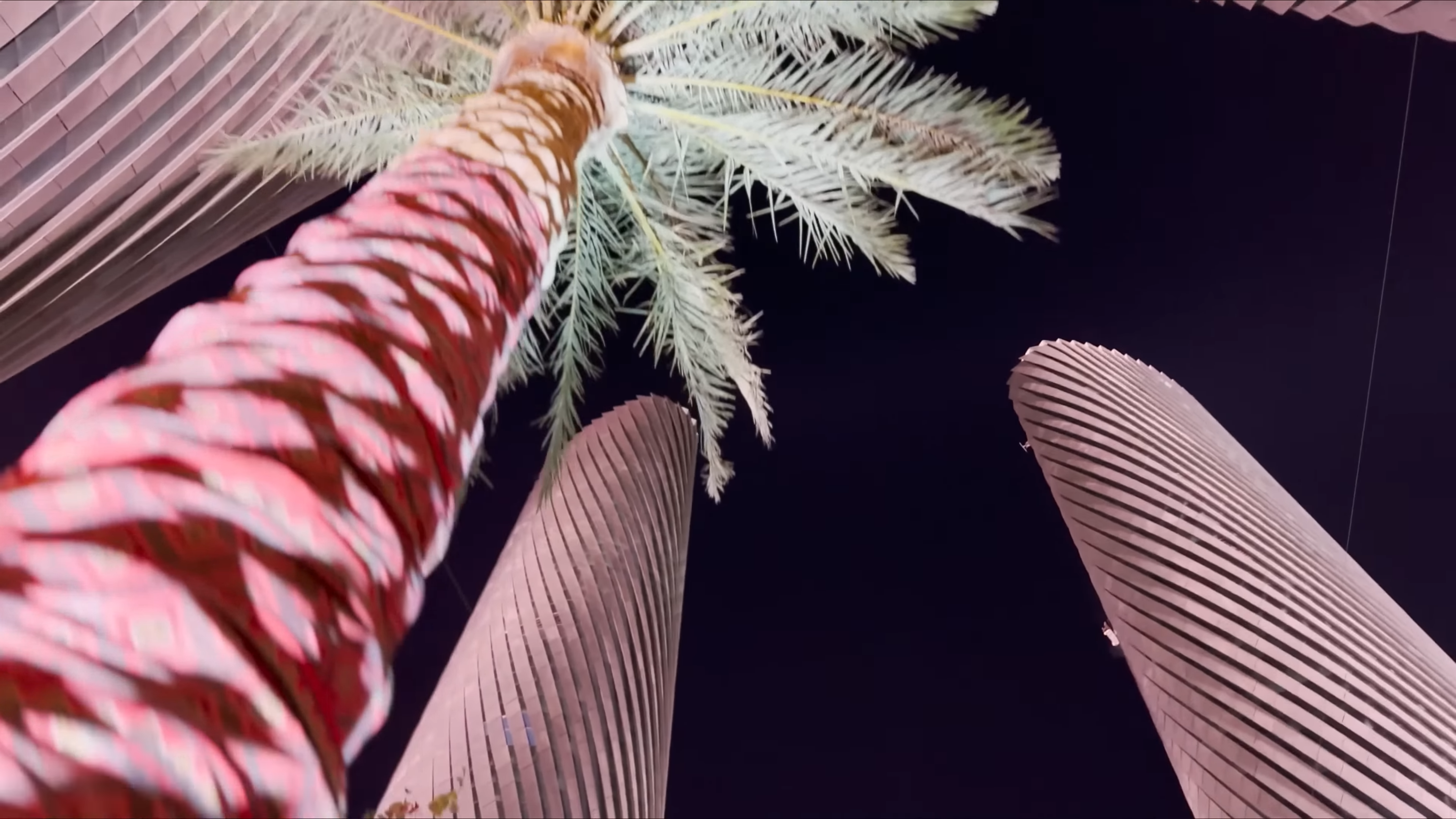
Upward view of Lusail Plaza Towers from Lusail Boulevard

Lusail's tallest structure is found here, the Lusail Plaza Towers. Two buildings are 301 metres (988 ft) and the two other 215 m (705 ft) high and have 220 floors in the four towers complex. It was begun in 2020 and will be completed in October 2023 (core and shell+ lobby finishings) The 1.1 million-square-metre development is host to the headquarters for the Qatar National Bank, Qatar Central Bank and Qatar Investment Authority alongside several other global organisations including Qatari Diar. Lusail Plaza Towers was designed by Foster & Partners.

=== Huzoom Lusail ===
Located on the northern edge of Lusail, Huzoom Lusail (Arabic: حزوم لوسيل) is a low-density residential community designed for family living. Its position next to the Lusail Expressway provides direct connections to neighbouring districts while preserving a quieter residential character.

== Landmarks ==
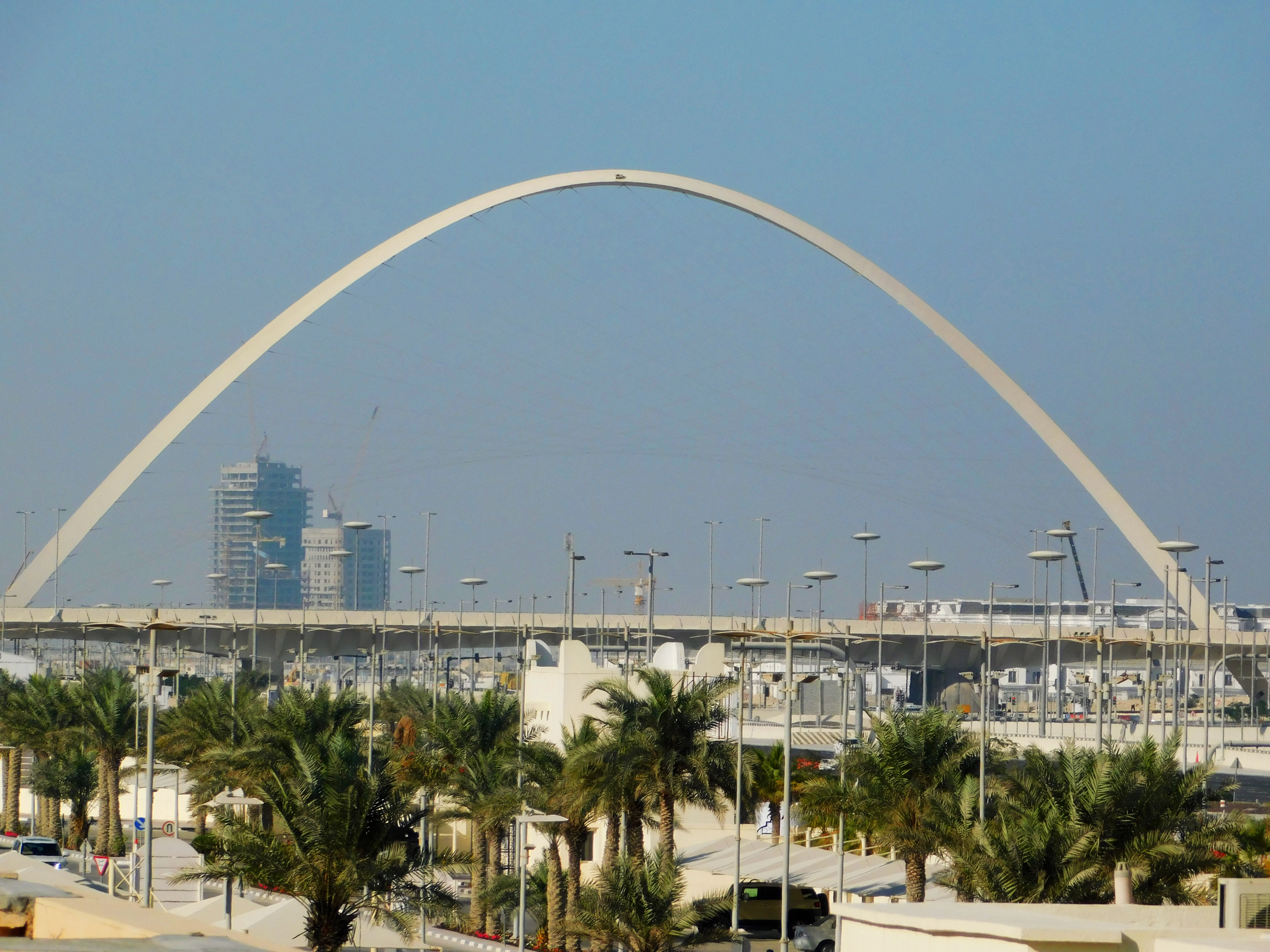
Lusail Marina Interchange Arch

=== Lusail Marina Arch ===
Lusail Marina Arch is a 74 metres (243 ft) tall sculpture at Marina Interchange.

=== Al Wahda Arches ===
Designed by Erik Behrens, Al Wahda Arches stand at 100 metres (330 ft) tall. It is located at the beginning of the Lusail Expressway, and its design is meant to represent the net that the pearl divers of Qatar's past would have used. Construction was completed in 2020, and the structure consists of two slanted arches with a connected net.

== Sports ==
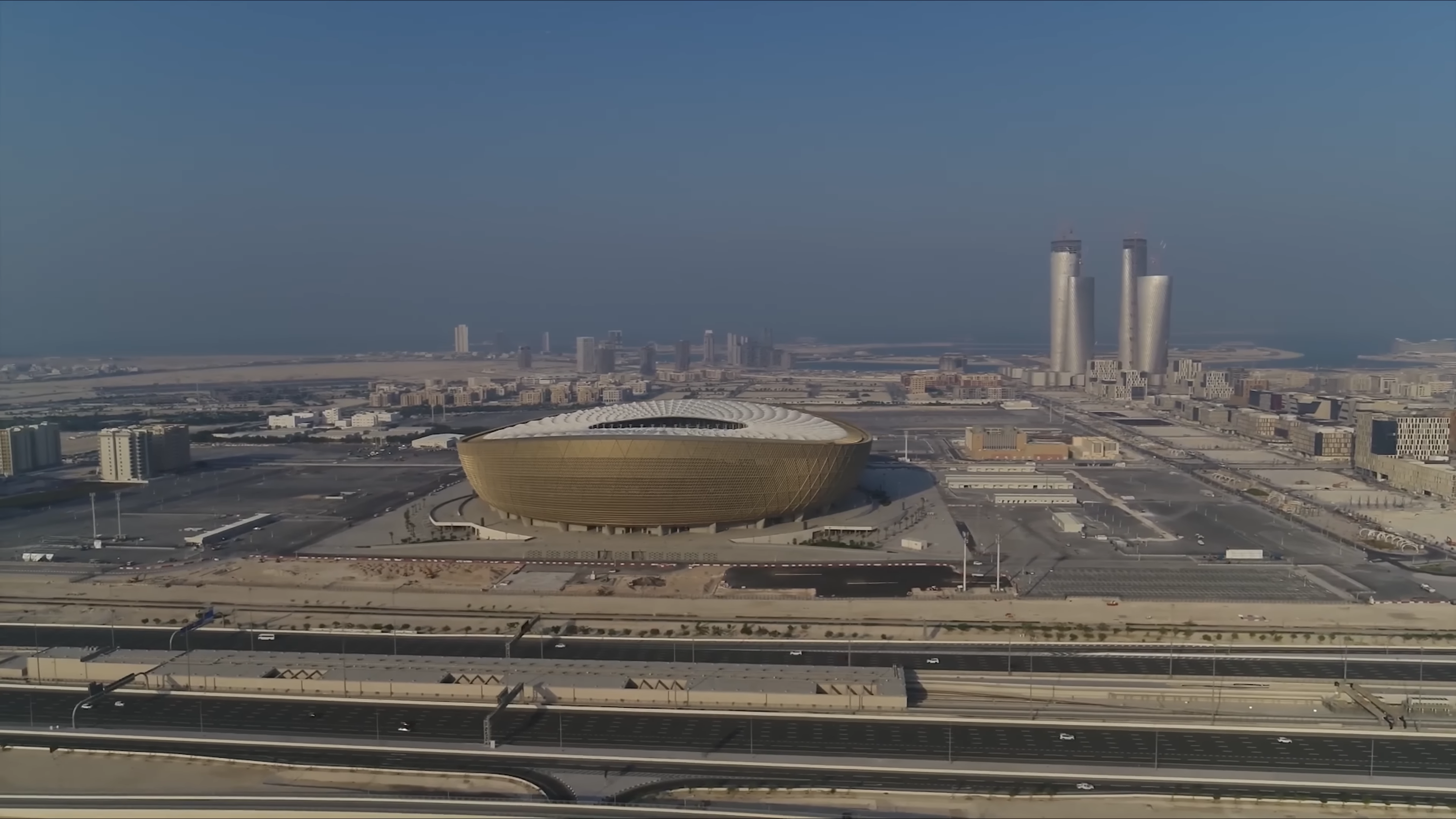
Lusail Stadium, a venue of the 2022 FIFA World Cup

Located just outside the city is the Lusail International Circuit, which has hosted the Qatar motorcycle Grand Prix every year since 2004. Since 2007 it has been the opening round of the MotoGP world championship, and in 2008 floodlights were installed in the facility, making it the only race on the calendar to be held at night. In November 2021, the track also hosted the inaugural Formula 1 Qatar Grand Prix as a replacement for the canceled Australian Grand Prix. Recently the track signed a new 10-year contract with F1, meaning that the track will host the Qatar Grand Prix until 2033. WEC (FIA World Endurance Championship) will also hold an endurance race on the track from 2024. This will make Losail the first track in the Middle East to hold F1, MotoGP, and WEC in the same season.

The first Qatari Diar Triathlon was held in the Spring of 2019 in Lusail City-Marina Promenade. The city was also announced as host of the 2025 T100 Triathlon World Championship final.

Lusail Sports Arena is another sporting venue in the city and hosted matches of the 2015 World Men's Handball Championship. Constructed at a cost of $318 million, it has a capacity of 15,300 spectators and opened its doors in 2012.

Lusail Stadium, with a capacity of 88,000+ people, hosted the Final of the 2022 FIFA World Cup. The stadium's design is inspired from the sail of a traditional dhow as the city is located north of Doha on the eastern coast, which is a historic focal point of pearling vessels. The architects are MANICA Architecture and Foster and Partners.

The city will host matches for the 2027 FIBA Basketball World Cup including the final phase.

== Education ==
As part of Lusail's master plan, the city is ultimately set to contain 36 schools with a capacity for 26,000 students. Upwards of 75,000 m^{2} (810,000 sq ft) has already been reserved for school buildings by the Lusail City Real Estate Development Company; these schools are expected to be commissioned by 2019. Universities in Lusail include Lusail University, UKM - Qatar (The National University of Malaysia - Qatar), and CUQ Ulster University.

== Economy ==
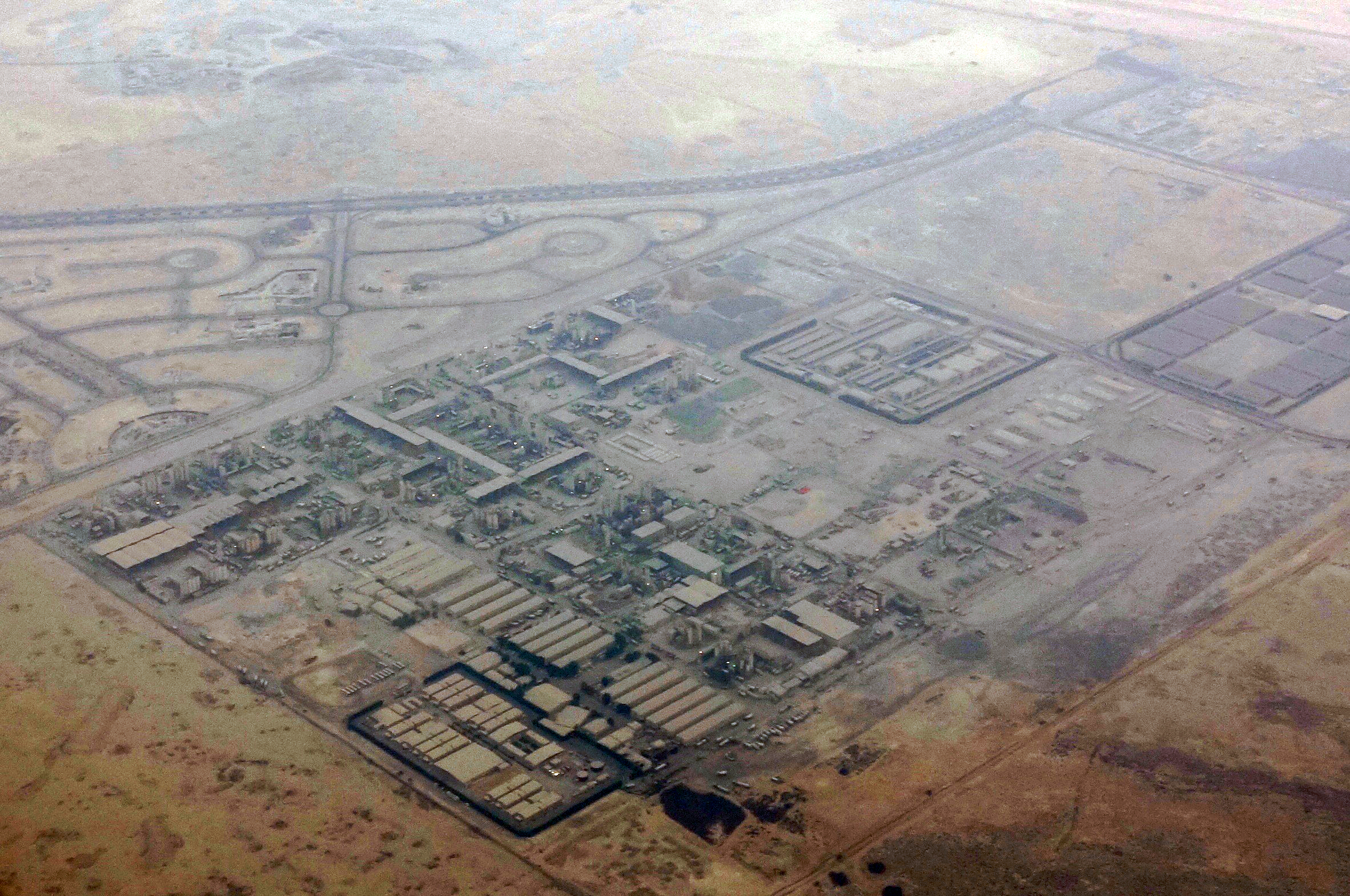
Aerial view of industries at Lusail

There are also non-energy-related companies headquartered in Lusail. Hotel operator and developer Katara Hospitality is based in the city, as is Qatari Diar Real Estate Investment Company and its subsidiaries, such as Lusail Real Estate Development Company and utilities company Marafeq Qatar. Qatari Diar was responsible for launching the Lusail City Development Project in 2005.

The Lusail Industrial Area hosts construction companies. In the Lusail Ready-Mix Batching Plant Zone, two ready-mix batching plants are maintained by Qatar Alpha Beton Ready Mix, one ready-mix batching plant is maintained by SMEET, REDCO owns a precast plant, Qatar Concrete has 1 ready-mix batching plant, and HBK ReMIX operates a ready-mix factory.

== Infrastructure ==
=== Utilities ===
A network of gas pipelines will transport synthetic natural gas (SNG) to the city. Distributed by a gas pipeline with a length upwards of 150 km^{2} (58 sq mi), up to 28,000 m^{3} (990,000 cu ft) per hour of natural gas will be fed from the Lusail City Gas Farm. Lusail's SNG system was developed as part of a joint venture between the National Gas Company of Oman and Qatari company Petro Serv Limited. In regards to power stations, 66 kV and 11 kV substations will be constructed. The latter will be built underground in specialized structures. Portions of the 66 kV substations connecting from mainland Lusail to the Qetaifan Islands are planned to be set up under the sea bed and run through utility tunnels.

=== Green spaces ===
There are public parks throughout Lusail's districts. In the Fox Hills district, for example, 33 parks provide around 10.3 hectares of green space. One of the largest parks is called Crescent Park. This park includes a forested area, an all-giraffe zoo, playgrounds, water features, bike trails, kiosks, monuments, and several sports fields. In addition, there are several small-to-mid-sized parks known as pocket gardens which contain fewer facilities than parks. There are 18 of these situated in the Marina district, occupying an overall space of more than 26,000 m^{2} (280,000 sq ft). Also in the Marina district are roughly 3 km (1.9 mi) of promenades along the waterfront.

=== Housing & accommodation ===
Once fully completed, Lusail is expected to house 250,000 residents. Future developments will see this capacity potentially increase to 450,000. Currently, 22 hotels are operating or under construction in the city.

Katara Hospitality stated that they would be constructing a luxury resort comprising a water park and a four-star hotel on the Qetaifan Island North in October 2017. Another project by Katara Hospitality, 'Katara Towers', was launched in October 2012 at a cost of QR 2.2 billion. Equipped with two hotels, high-end apartments, and other facilities, the project was scrapped after a short time. It was revealed by the company that they had relaunched the project in August 2017 and were estimating a completion date of 2020.

== Tourism ==
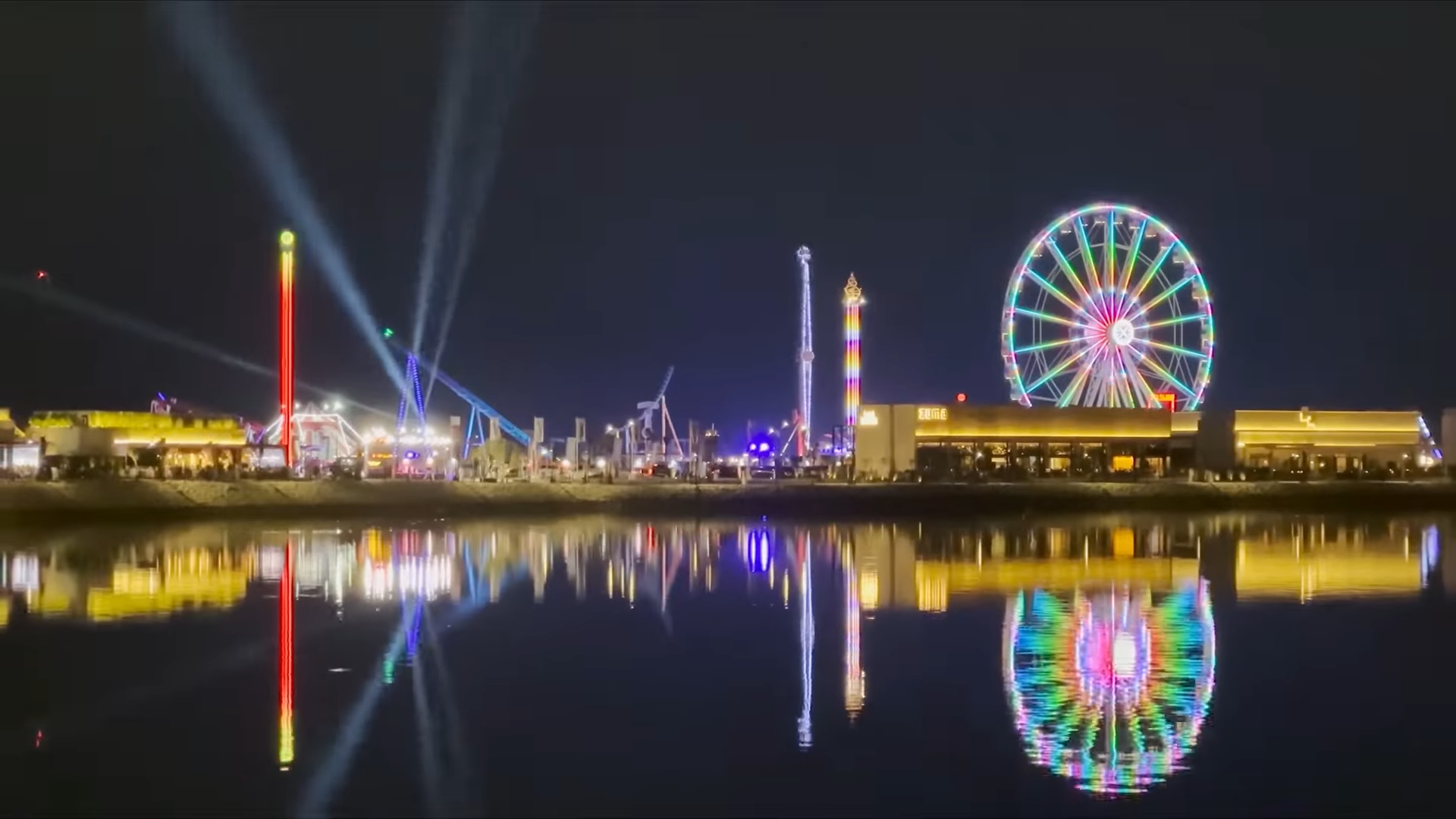
View of Lusail Winter Wonderland

Qatar has launched several large tourism projects, including the Lusail City complex. Place Vendôme Mall, Katara Towers, Al Maha Island, Lusail Winter Wonderland, Crescent Park, Lusail Marina, Lusail Pedestrian Bridges and Qetaifan islands are among the most important tourist centers of Lusail.

=== Al Maha Island ===
Lusail Winter Wonderland, is a 93,000 square meter theme park offering 50 amusement rides. It will include a 150-foot Ferris wheel, 25 family rides, 15 children rides, and 10 thrill rides. It also has a 395 rollercoaster. Al Maha Island also includes The Arena, a concert venue and fan zone, with a capacity of 3,000-5000 spectators.

== Transport ==
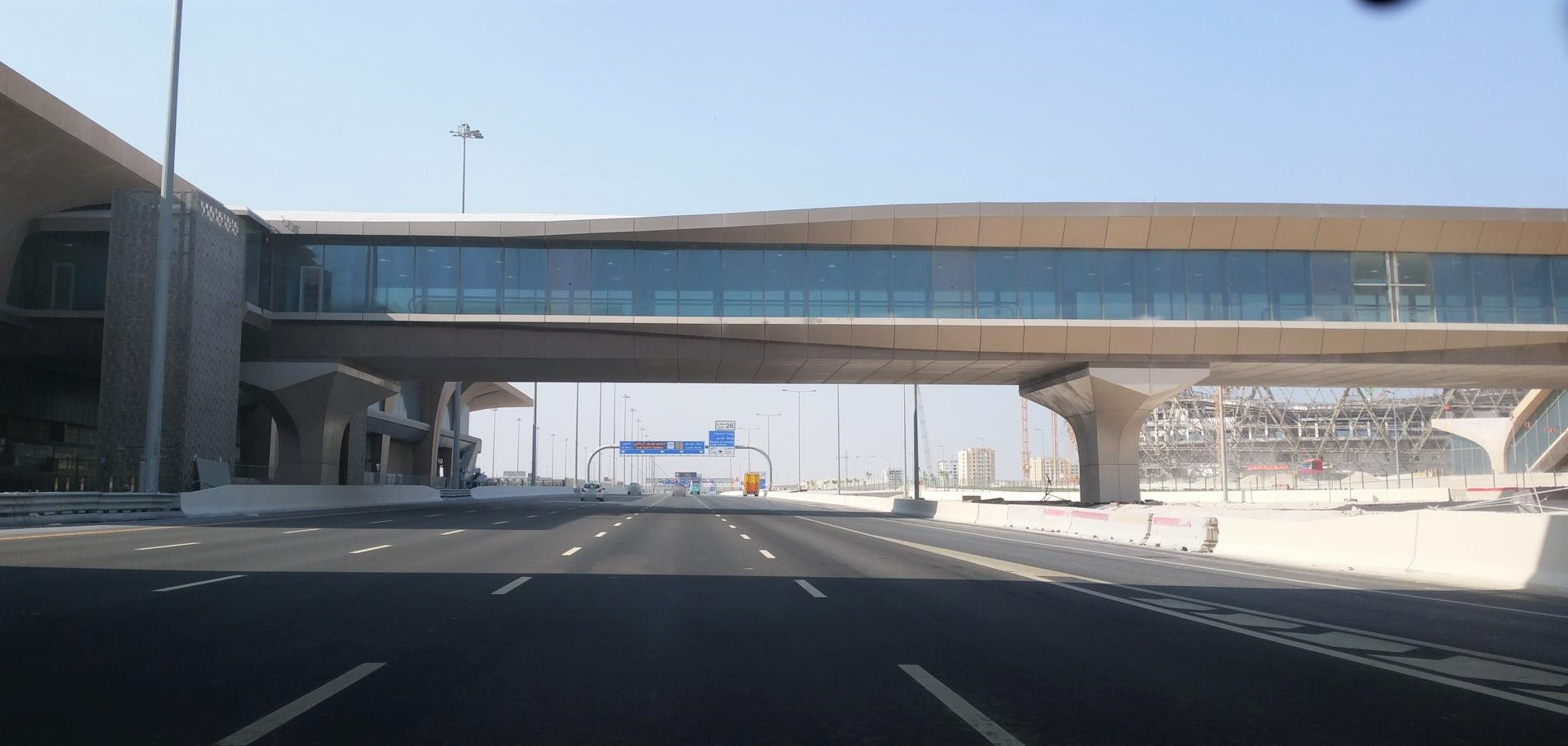
Lusail metro station and construction of the Lusail Iconic Stadium

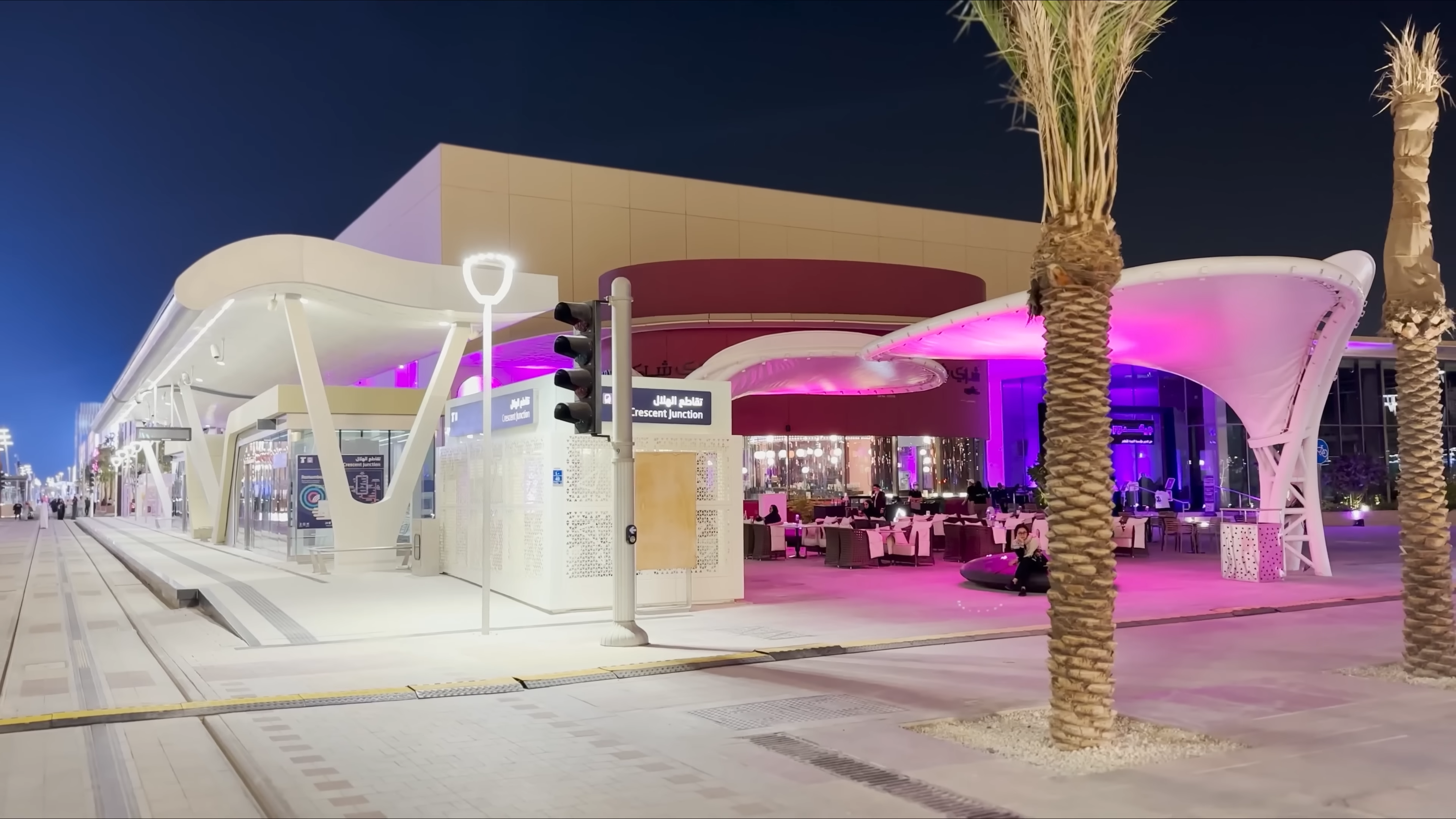
Crescent Junction tram station

Transport in Lusail is facilitated by six main roads which connect to Doha in the south, connect to Lusail Highway in the east and north and connect to Al Khor Highway in the west.

Doha Metro's Red Line runs through Lusail, providing its residents with convenient access to Doha and Al Wakrah. Lusail station opened to the public on 10 December 2019 along with three other Red Line stations, over six months after the opening of the line's first 13 stations. It is located on Al Khor Coastal Road (also known as Route Q1A) and is the northern terminus of the Red Line. There is one metrolink, which is the Doha Metro's free feeder bus network, servicing the station:

- M145, which serves Doha Festival City in Umm Salal Municipality.

Qatar Rail is involved in the construction of the Lusail Tram. First designed in August 2007, the Lusail Tram will be spread over a distance of 33.1 km (20.6 mi), of which 10.4 km (6.5 mi) will be underground and the remaining 22.7 km (14.1 mi) will be overground. The network will connect to the Doha Metro Red Line through the Lusail Main Station and the Lusail Marina Station.

== Future development plans ==
The plan is to eventually have the infrastructure to accommodate 450,000 people, of which it is estimated that 250,000 or fewer will be residents, with around 190,000 office workers and 60,000 retail workers.

It is planned to have marinas, residential areas, island resorts, commercial districts, luxury shopping and leisure facilities, a golf course community, man-made islands, and several entertainment districts. Development is being carried out by the state-controlled developer Qatari Diar along with Parsons Corporation and Dorsch-Gruppe.

=== North Residential District ===
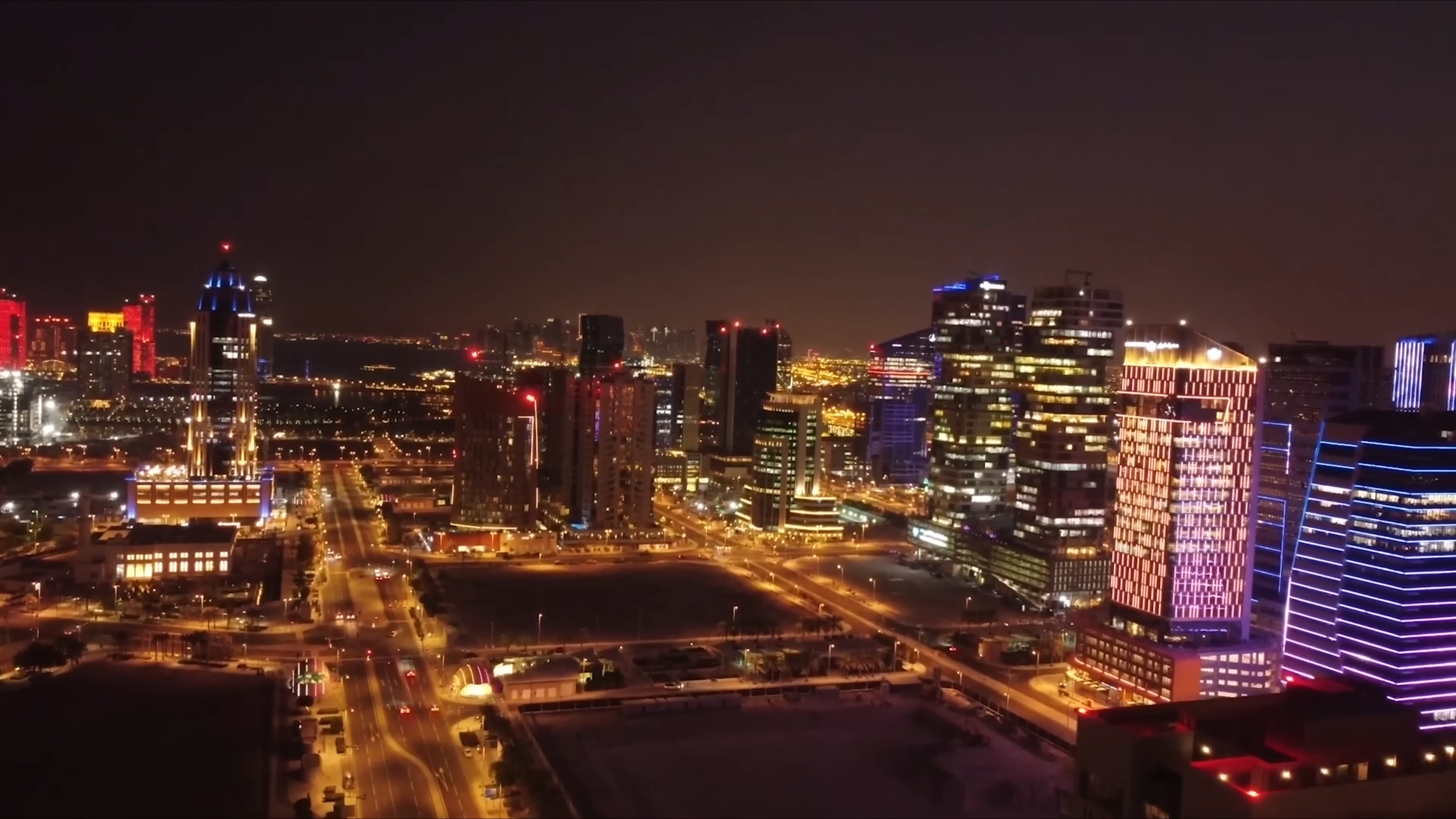
Skyscrapers in Lusail

Once fully completed, the North Residential District will feature 895 large villas spread over an area of 126 hectares. As part of the city's educational plan, there will be six schools in this district, 4 of which are kindergartens, with the other two accommodating kindergarten to secondary students.

=== Waterfront Commercial District ===
Also known as Seef Lusail, the Waterfront Commercial District will serve as a hub for shopping malls and other commercial establishments. A small amount of land in this district has been designated for residential and office use. City developers have planned two kindergartens for this district.

=== Al Erkyah ===
Located along the Al Khor Coastal Road, Al Erkyah will be a mixed-use district comprising mainly open space, commercial and medical facilities. According to the education guidelines published by the city, one 10,000 m^{2} (110,000 sq ft) primary school will be based here.

=== Energy City 2 ===
This district, found next to the industrial-oriented Energy City 1, will consist mainly of residential units, especially for residents who are employed in Energy City 1. In the future it is planned to contain a school for children aged 3 to 18 spanning a roughly 14,000 m^{2} (150,000 sq ft) area.

=== Entertainment City ===
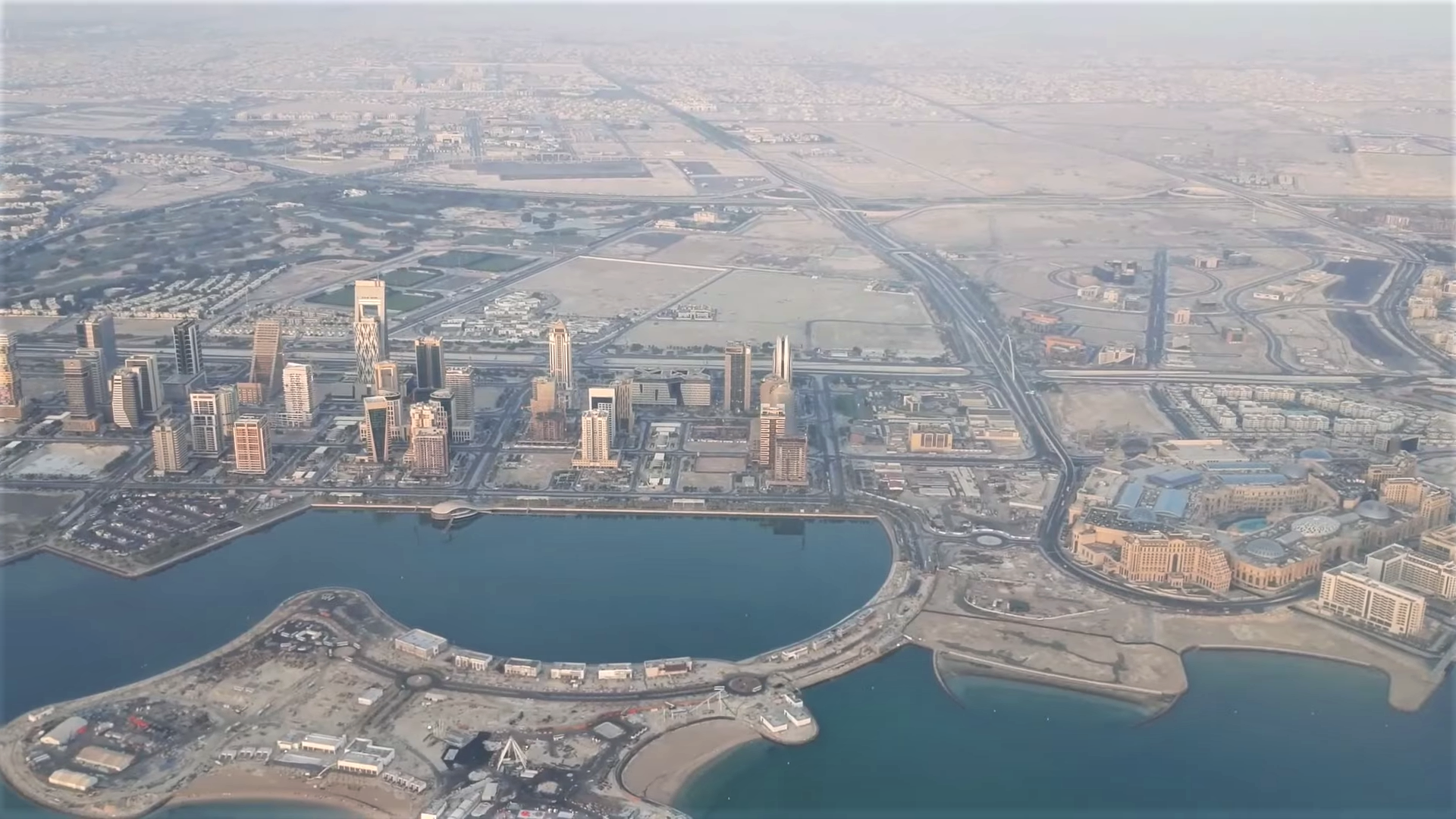
Aerial photograph of Place Vendôme shopping mall (right) in Lusail in 2022

A designated entertainment district, Entertainment City will contain over 2,000 housing units, 11 hotels, and several theme parks, nightclubs, and shopping malls. Place Vendôme is a major mall in the city that incorporates a canal spanning the length of the facility, an amusement park, and a cinema complex. In regards to education, there will be one 10,000 m^{2} (110,000 sq ft) primary school here.

=== Entertainment Island ===
This district will play host to a large-scale museum in the future.

=== Medical and Education District ===
Most of Lusail's medical and education facilities will be based here. Furthermore, there will be a small amount of residences here. Much green space will be spread throughout the district.

=== QatarEnergy District ===
Serving Qatar's chief energy company QatarEnergy, this district will host the new headquarters of QP. Transport will be facilitated by the Lusail LRT and the adjacent Al Khor Coastal Road.

=== Marina District ===
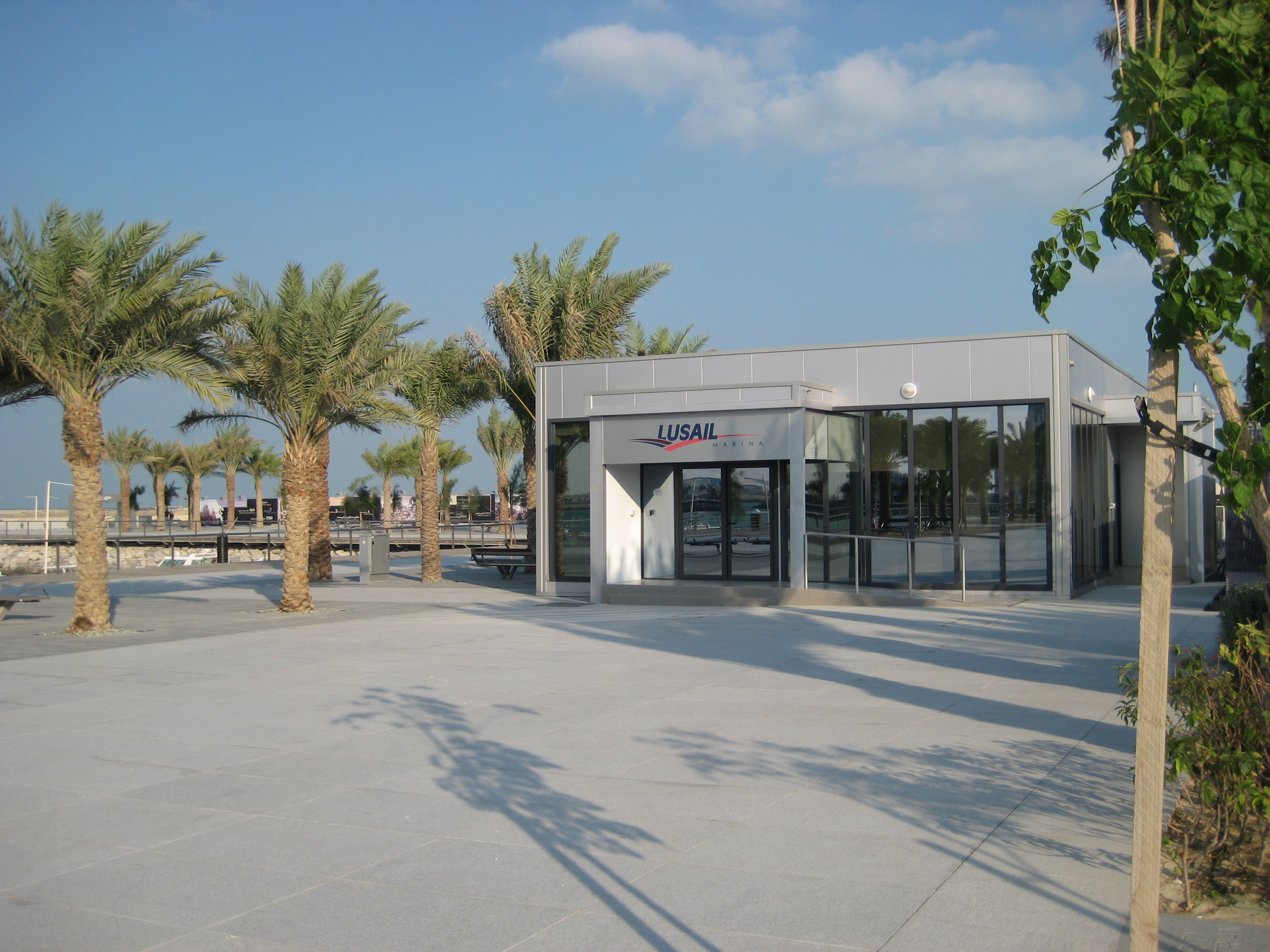
Lusail's Marina district

One of the main attractions of the Marina district will be Katara Hospitality's tourism complex known as Lusail Marina Iconic Development. When completed, the complex will feature leisure facilities, luxury restaurants, and upwards of 800 hotel and apartment rooms.

Another attraction is the Marina Twin Towers, which comprises 8,236 m^{2} (88,650 sq ft) of office space. Retail demand will be mainly be met by Lusail Marina Mall, which will cover an area of 57,605 m^{2} (620,060 sq ft).

It is planned for two primary schools to be built here, one exclusively for boys and the other exclusively for girls.

=== Qetaifan Islands ===
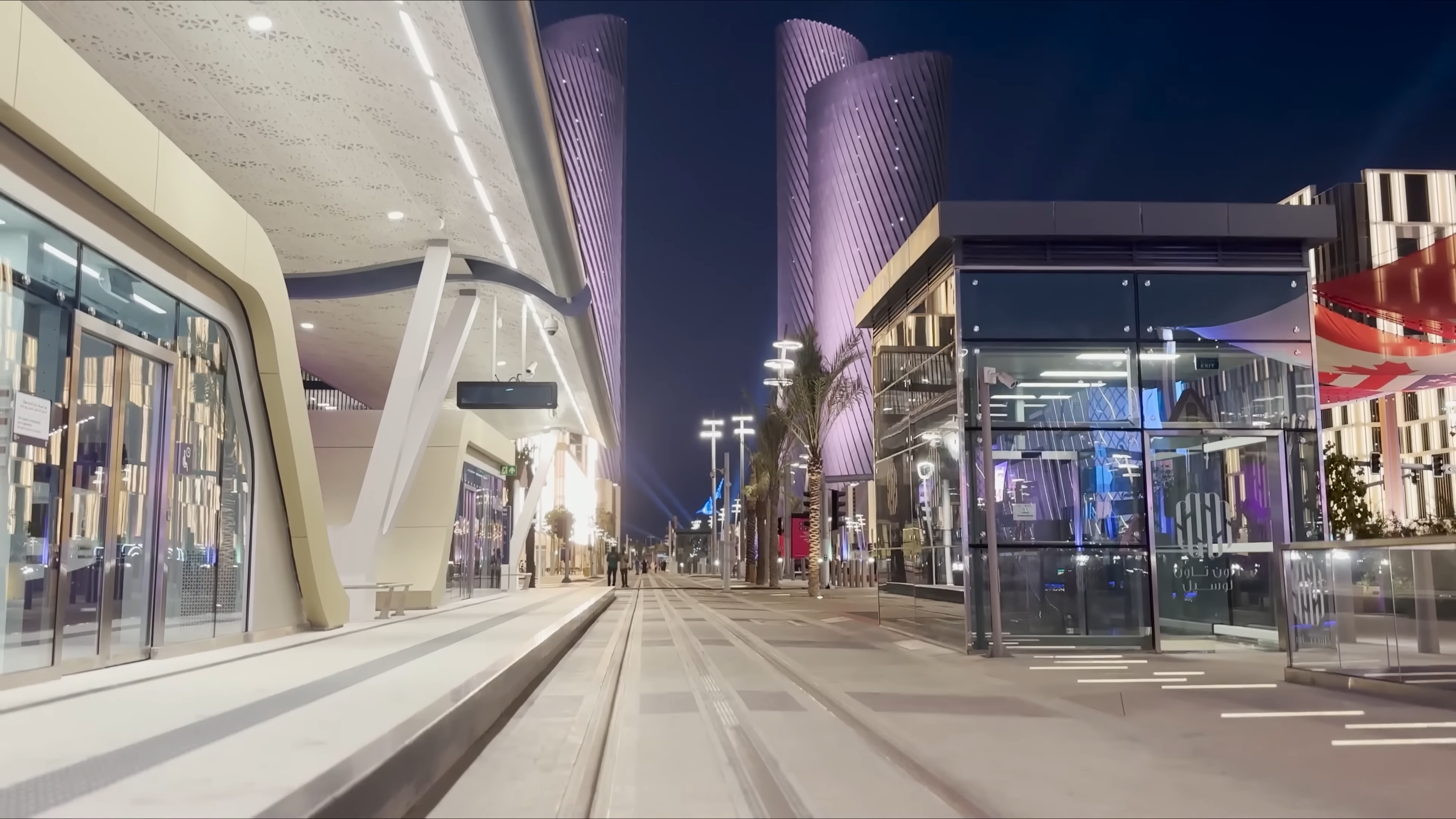
Lusail Boulevard Commercial at night

In large part, Qetaifan Island North will consist of tourist attractions such as water parks and hotels.

Qetaifan Island South is composed of three islands. Prospective luxury villas, a marina waterfront, and marketplaces will be built here. Furthermore, a school for primary and secondary students is planned.

=== Boulevard Commercial ===
As the central hub of Lusail, retail and office space will be found here. Its street and buildings will be inspired by the Champs-Élysées avenue in France. Three kindergartens are in the works for this district.

== See also ==
- The Pearl-Qatar
