= Al Kharayej =

Al Kharayej الخرايج
- District
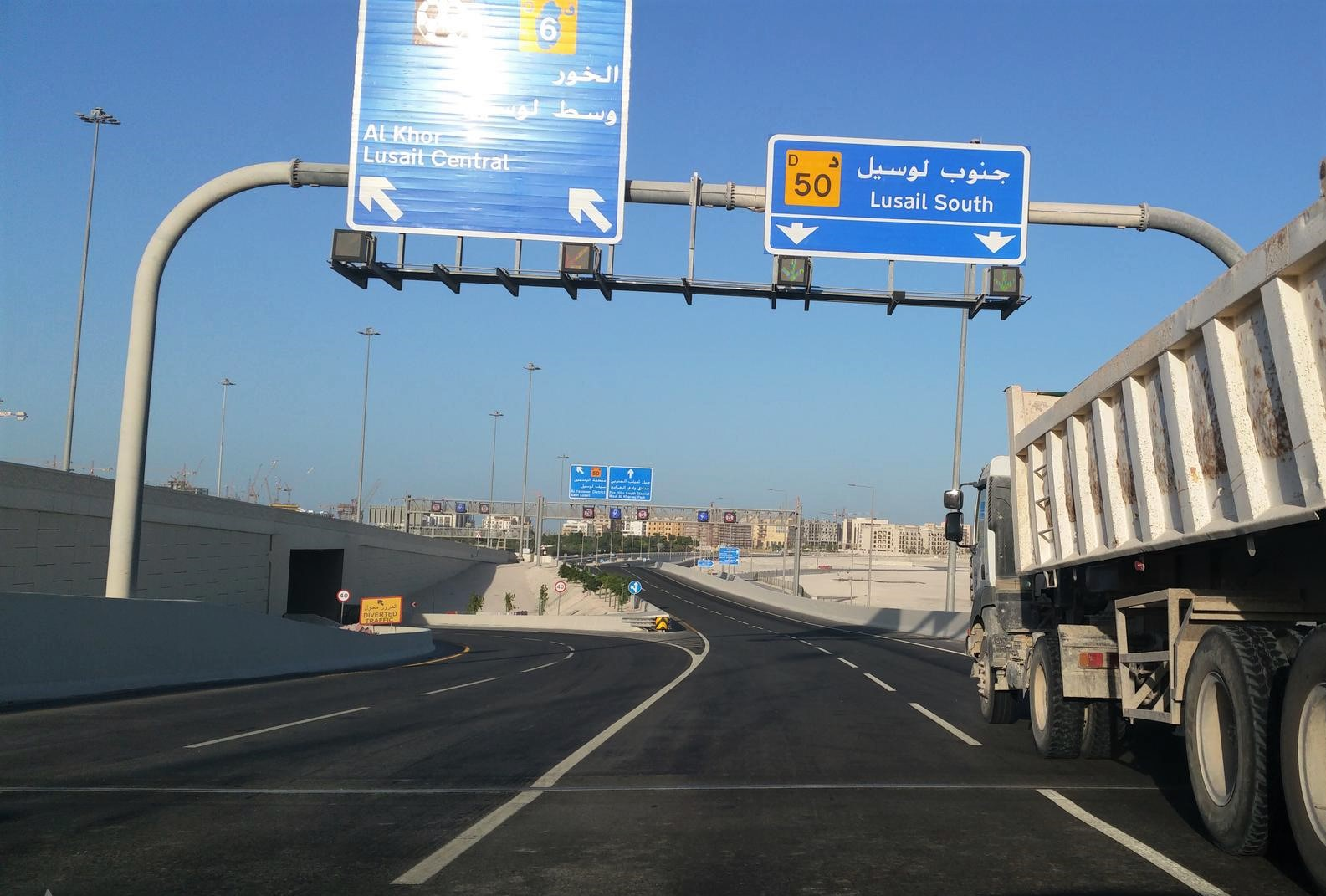
- View of Al Kharayej district from Al Khor Expressway in 2020

- Al Kharayej
- Coordinates: 25°25′49″N 51°30′17″E
- Country: Qatar
- Municipality: Al Daayen / Doha
- Zone: Zone 69
- District no.: 113

Area
  - Total: 6.8 km^{2} (2.6 sq mi)

Al Kharayej (Arabic: الخرايج, romanized: Al Kharā’ij) is a district in Qatar that is located geographically in the municipality of Al Daayen but is included in the census as a district of Doha. Following the adoption of a cabinet resolution in 2002, Al Kharayej became one of three settlements in Qatar where foreigners could own real estate. It is a part of Lusail city.

== Etymology ==
Traditionally an agricultural settlement, Al Kharayej is named after a local saline spring, with kharayej being the Arabic term for such a spring. Many salt-tolerant forages grow around it, making it a popular grazing area for nomadic herdsman.

== Geography ==
Located in the southeast corner of Al Daayen, Al Kharayej borders Al Kheesa and Wadi Al Banat to the west, Al Egla to the south and Lusail to the north. To the east it is surrounded by the Persian Gulf.
