= Jabal Thuaileb =

Jabal Thuaileb جبل ثعيلب
- District
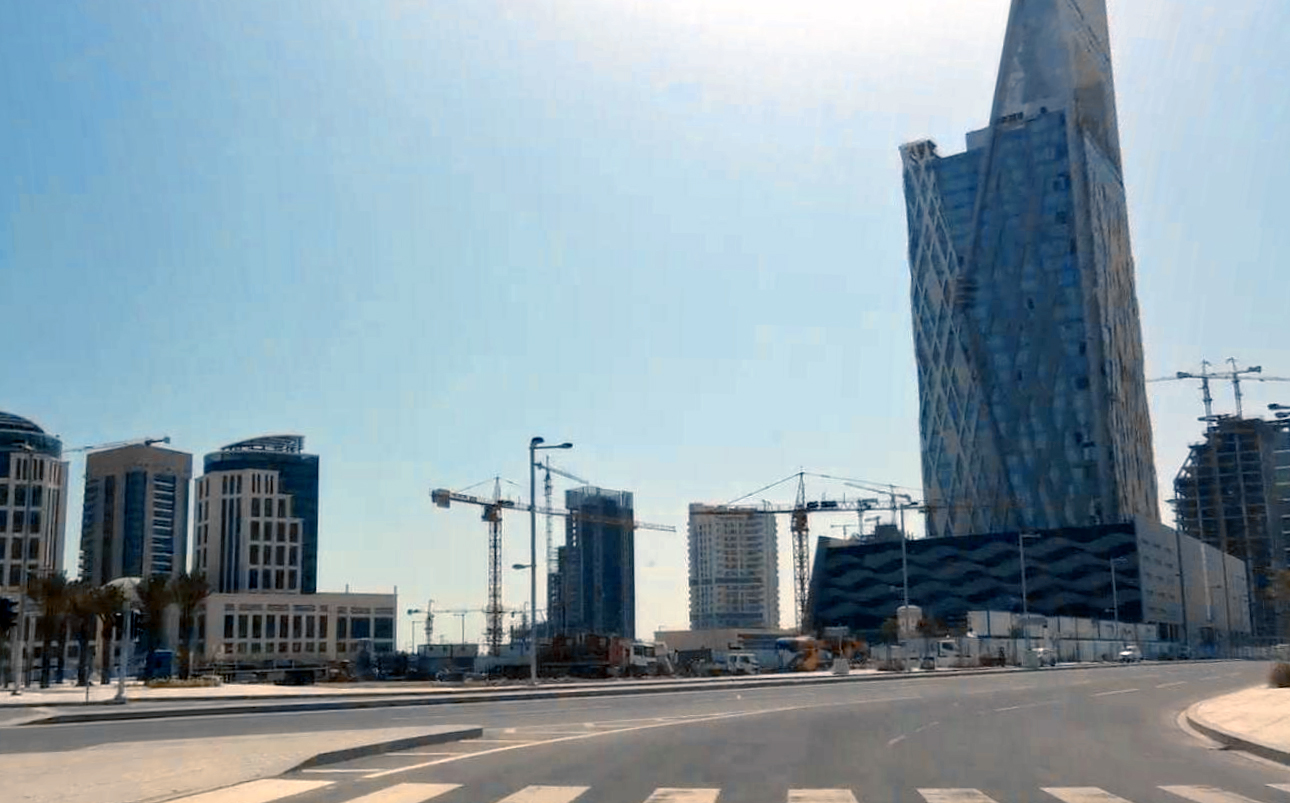
- Jabal Thuaileb skyline near Lusail Street

- Jabal Thuaileb
- Coordinates: 25°24′44″N 51°31′6″E
- Country: Qatar
- Municipality: Al Daayen / Doha
- Zone: Zone 69
- District no.: 114

Area
  - Total: 7.7 km^{2} (3.0 sq mi)

Jabal Thuaileb (Arabic: جبل ثعيلب, romanized: Jabal Thu‘aylib, lit. 'Fox Hills') is a Qatari district in the municipality of Al Daayen. It is also a census-designated district of Doha . It is closely situated to Lusail. After a cabinet resolution was passed in 2002, Jabal Thuaileb became the one of three districts in Qatar where foreigners could own real estate.

== Etymology ==
The jabal portion of the district's name means "hill" or "mountain" in Arabic. Thuaileb is derived from the Arabic word thaʿlab, which translates to "fox" in English. It was so named due to the presence of a prominent hill and the habitation of foxes in the area.

== Infrastructure ==
Jabal Thuaileb is closely tied to the planned city of Lusail, which has been undergoing massive construction projects since the 21st century. In 2006, it was first revealed that Qatari Diar would commence large-scale construction in both Lusail and Jabal Thuaileb as part of the Lusail Development Project. It was announced in 2013 that it would receive its first inhabitants for its under-development residential complexes in 2014.

In 2015, the community was said to accommodate 9,200 apartments ranging from 5 to 7 stories, with all buildings comprising roughly 2 million square meters of Jebel Thuaileb's 1.8 square kilometer area. Many of the buildings were constructed with traditional architectural elements in order to represent Qatari heritage. Most major infrastructure projects for electricity, water and streets were completed the same year.
