= Shafallah Center =

Disability organisation in Qatar

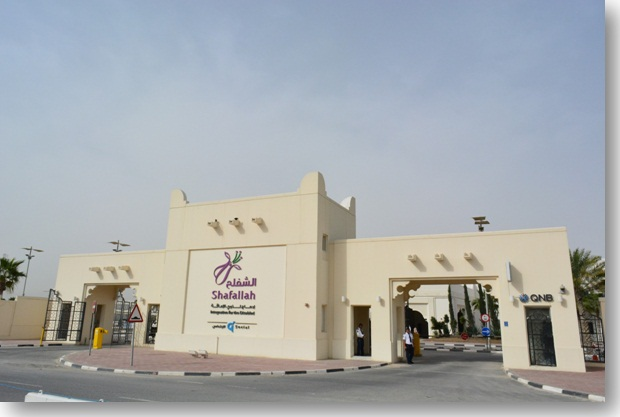
Entrance to the center

The Shafallah Center, or Shafallah Center for Children with Special Needs, is a Qatar-based organization founded in 1999 for the welfare of people with intellectual disabilities, mainly autism spectrum disorders. The center provides health services and special care. Additionally, Shafallah has education centers, and signs agreements with local firms in order to help its graduates secure jobs.

== History ==
Shafallah Center was established in 1999.

== Activities ==
An annual forum focusing on global issues affecting people with disabilities is organized by the Shafallah Center. Called the Annual Shafallah Forum, topics of discussion at the forum include the difficulties faced by refugees and children with autism spectrum disorders in developing countries, and methods to alleviate these difficulties. Several world leaders have attended past editions.

Autism research is conducted at the organization's Medical Genetic Center. Shafallah has also conducted genome sequencing as a research tool on a local scale.

In October 2015, Shafallah saw its first-ever batch of students graduate. The graduation class had 189 students.

== Partnerships ==
Shafallah Center is partnered with American organization Autism Speaks. In December 2014, Shafallah signed an agreement with Qatar Airways in order to provide preferential employment opportunities for individuals with intellectual abilities. This resulted in a minimum of 25 members of Shafallah being employed by the airline.
