= Zone 69, Qatar =

Zone 69
- Zone
- Interactive map of Zone 69
- Coordinates: 25.420727°N 51.516177°E
- Country: Qatar
- Municipality: Al Daayen
- Blocks: 93

Area
  - Total: 51.1 km^{2} (19.7 sq mi)

Population
  - Total: 1,338 (2,015)
- Time zone: UTC+03 (Arabia Standard Time)
- ISO 3166 code: QA-ZA

Zone 69 is a zone of the municipality of Al Daayen in Qatar. The main districts recorded in the 2015 population census were Al Egla, Al Kharayej, Jabal Thuaileb, Lusail, and Wadi Al Banat.

Another district which falls within its administrative boundaries is Al Aaliya Island.

== Demographics ==
Year	Population
1986	0
1997	65
2004	267
2010	2,404
2015	1,338

== Land use ==
The Ministry of Municipality and Environment's breakdown of land use in the zone is as follows.

Area (km^{2})	Developed land (km^{2})	Undeveloped land (km^{2})	Residential (km^{2})	Commercial/ Industrial (km^{2})	Education/ Health (km^{2})	Farming/ Green areas (km^{2})	Other uses (km^{2})
51.12	29.07	22.05	0.31	0.01	0.10	0.00	28.65
