= Hamad Hospital station =

Metro station in Doha, Qatar

Hamad Hospital metro station مستشفى حمد محطة مترو

General information
- Location: Al Rayyan Road, opposite of Hamad Hospital, Doha; Qatar
- Coordinates: 25.29053°N 51.50055°E
- Owner: Qatar Rail
- Operator: Doha Metro
- Platforms: 2
- Tracks: 2

Construction
- Structure type: Underground
- Parking: Yes
- Accessible: Yes

Other information
- Website: http://www.qr.com.qa/

History
- Opened: 10 December 2019

Services
Preceding station	Doha Metro	Following station
Al Messila towards Al Riffa	Green Line	The White Palace towards Al Mansoura
Location

Hamad Hospital station is an underground station on the Doha Metro's Green Line in Qatar. It is located on Al Rayyan Road in the Al Sadd district of Doha, opposite Hamad Hospital in Hamad Medical City. It serves both the aforementioned districts.

The station currently has one metrolink. Facilities on the premises include restrooms and a prayer room.

== History ==
The station was opened to the public on 10 December 2019 along with the other stations of the Green Line (also known as the Education Line).

== Station layout ==
G	Street level	Exit/entrance
-1	Mezzanine	Fare control, ticket sales
-2	Concourse	Shops
-3	Westbound	toward Al Riffa
-3	Island platform, doors will open on the left or right
-3	Eastbound	toward Al Mansoura

== Metrolinks ==
Hamad Hospital station has one metrolink, which is the Doha Metro's free feeder bus network, servicing the station:

- M210, which serves Al Sadd (Zone 38).

== Connections ==
It is served by bus routes 40, 41, 42, 43, 45, 49, 94, 104, 104A, and 104B.
