= Al Messila station =

Metro station in Doha, Qatar

Al Messila Metro Station المسيلة محطة مترو
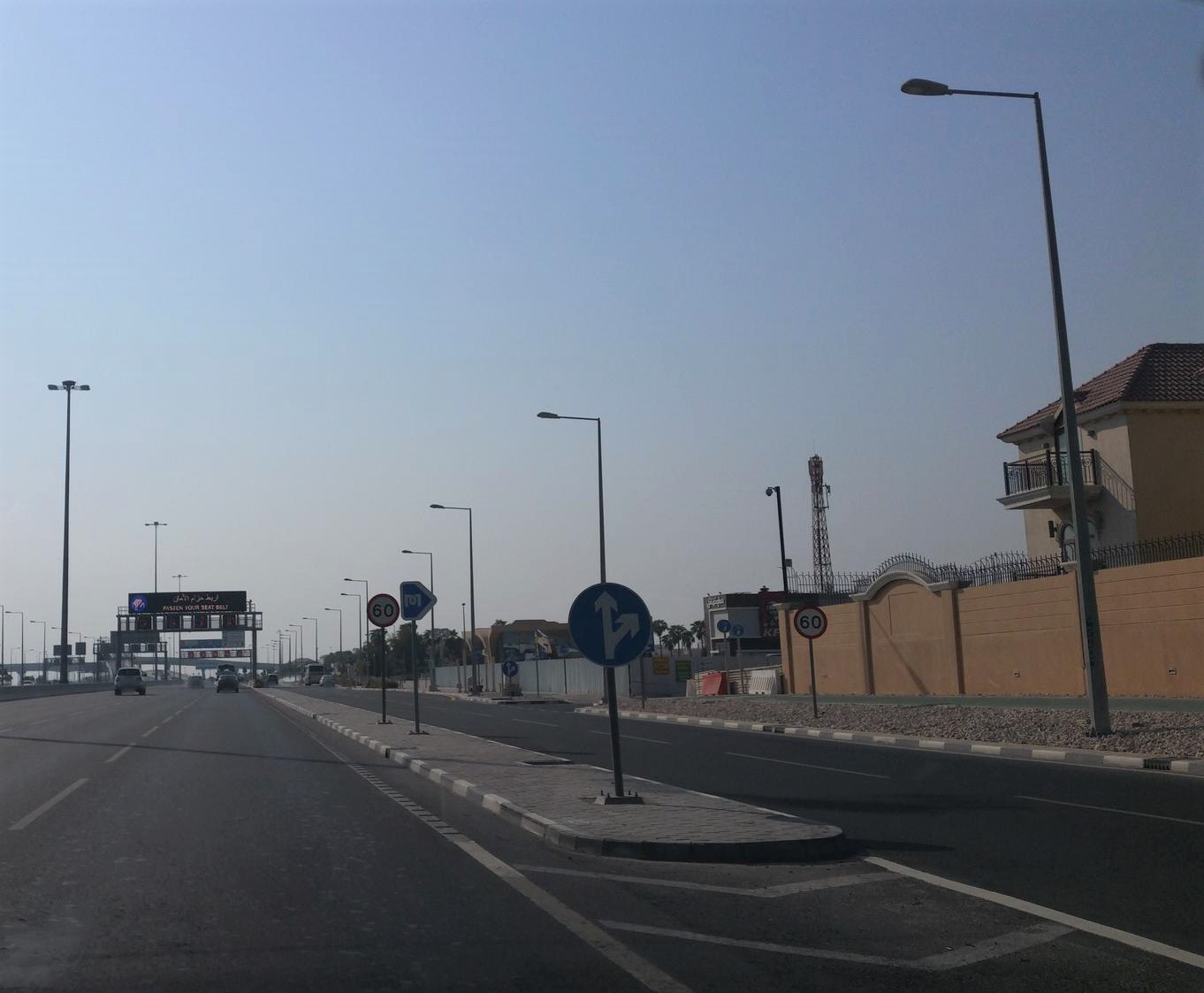

General information
- Location: Al Rayyan Road, Doha; Qatar
- Coordinates: 25.29331°N 51.48370°E
- Owner: Qatar Rail
- Operator: Doha Metro
- Platforms: 2
- Tracks: 2

Construction
- Structure type: Underground
- Parking: Yes
- Accessible: Yes

Other information
- Website: http://www.qr.com.qa/

History
- Opened: 10 December 2019

Services
Preceding station	Doha Metro	Following station
Al Rayyan Al Qadeem towards Al Riffa	Green Line	Hamad Hospital towards Al Mansoura
Location

Al Messila station is a station on the Doha Metro's Green Line. It serves the districts on the mutual border of Doha and Al Rayyan, specifically Al Messila, Al Sadd, New Al Hitmi, and Lebday. It is located on Al Rayyan Road in Al Sadd, across the street from Al Sadd's boundary with Al Messila.

The station currently has two metrolinks. Facilities on the premises include restrooms and a prayer room.

== History ==
The station was opened to the public on 10 December 2019 along with the other stations of the Green Line (also known as the Education Line).

== Metrolinks ==
Al Messila station has two metrolinks, which is the Doha Metro's free feeder bus network, servicing the station:

- M208, which serves Madinat Khalifa South.
- M209, which serves New Al Hitmi and Fereej Bin Omran.

== Station layout ==
G	Street level	Exit/entrance
-1	Mezzanine	Fare control, ticket sales
-2	Concourse	Shops
-3	Westbound	toward Al Riffa
-3	Island platform, doors will open on the left or right
-3	Eastbound	toward Al Mansoura

== Connections ==
It is served by bus routes 40, 41, 42, 43, 45, 104 and 104A.
