= Qatar National Library station =

Metro station in Qatar

Qatar National Library Metro Station مكتبة قطر الوطنية محطة مترو

General information
- Location: Al Luqta Street–Oulour Street intersection, Ar-Rayyan Municipality; Qatar
- Coordinates: 25.31923°N 51.44173°E
- Owner: Qatar Rail
- Operator: Doha Metro
- Platforms: 2
- Tracks: 2

Construction
- Structure type: Underground
- Parking: Yes
- Accessible: Yes

Other information
- Website: http://www.qr.com.qa/

History
- Opened: 10 December 2019

Services
Preceding station	Doha Metro	Following station
Education City towards Al Riffa	Green Line	Al Shaqab towards Al Mansoura
Location

The Qatar National Library station is a station on the Doha Metro's Green Line in the Al Shagub district. It serves the municipality of Al Rayyan, specifically Al Shagub and other districts associated with Education City and Qatar Foundation. It is located on Al Luqta Street, beside the Qatar National Library.

The station currently has no metrolinks. Facilities on the premises include restrooms and a prayer room.

== History ==
The station was opened to the public on 10 December 2019 along with the other stations of the Green Line (also known as the Education Line).

== Station layout ==
G	Street level	Exit/entrance
-1	Mezzanine	Fare control, ticket sales
-2	Concourse	Shops
-3	Westbound	toward Al Riffa
-3	Island platform, doors will open on the left or right
-3	Eastbound	toward Al Mansoura
