= Education City station =

Metro station in Al Rayyan, Qatar

Education City metro station المدينة التعليمية محطة مترو

General information
- Location: Al Luqta Street, near intersection of Al Luqta Street–Gharrafat Al Rayyan Street in Ar-Rayyan Municipality; Qatar
- Coordinates: 25.31674°N 51.42563°E
- Owner: Qatar Rail
- Operator: Doha Metro
- Platforms: 2
- Tracks: 2

Construction
- Structure type: Underground
- Parking: Yes
- Accessible: Yes

Other information
- Website: http://www.qr.com.qa/

History
- Opened: 10 December 2019

Services
Preceding station	Doha Metro	Following station
Al Riffa Terminus	Green Line	Qatar National Library towards Al Mansoura
Location

Education City station is a station on the Doha Metro's Green Line in Education City, in the Doha Metropolitan Area of Qatar. It serves the municipality of Al Rayyan, specifically Education City, Bani Hajer, and the associated districts of Education City such as Gharrafat Al Rayyan and Al Shagub. The station is located on Al Luqta Street.

The station currently has no metrolinks, However, the Blue Line of the Education City Tram can be accessed through 0.10km of walking. Facilities on the premises include restrooms and a prayer room.

== History ==
The station was opened to the public on 10 December 2019 along with the other stations of the Green Line (also known as the Education Line).

== Station layout ==
G	Street level	Exit/entrance
-1	Mezzanine	Fare control, ticket sales
-2	Concourse	Shops
-3	Westbound	toward Al Riffa
-3	Island platform, doors will open on the left or right
-3	Eastbound	toward Al Mansoura
