= Al Shaqab station =

Metro station in Al Rayyan, Qatar

Al Shaqab Metro Station الشقب محطة مترو

General information
- Location: Huwar Street, near the Huwar Street–Bawhat Bu Feeleta Street intersection, Ar-Rayyan Municipality; Qatar
- Coordinates: 25.30931°N 51.45334°E
- Owner: Qatar Rail
- Operator: Doha Metro
- Platforms: 2
- Tracks: 2

Construction
- Structure type: Underground
- Parking: Yes
- Accessible: Yes

Other information
- Website: http://www.qr.com.qa/

History
- Opened: 10 December 2019

Services
Preceding station	Doha Metro	Following station
Qatar National Library towards Al Riffa	Green Line	Al Rayyan Al Qadeem towards Al Mansoura
Location

Al Shaqab station is a station on the Doha Metro's Green Line. Despite its name, the station is located on Huwar Street in Old Al Rayyan, but is near the border with Al Shaqab (also spelled "Al Shagub"). It serves the municipality of Al Rayyan, specifically Education City, Al Shaqab, Old Al Rayyan, Al Luqta and the suburb of Ain Al Rakheesa.

The station currently has no service from metrolink, which is the Doha Metro's free feeder bus network. Facilities on the premises include restrooms and a prayer room.

== History ==
The station was opened to the public on 10 December 2019 along with the other stations of the Green Line, which is also known as the Education Line.

== Connections ==
It is served by bus routes 42, 45 and 57.

== Station layout ==
G	Street level	Exit/entrance
-1	Mezzanine	Fare control, ticket sales
-2	Concourse	Shops
-3	Westbound	toward Al Riffa
-3	Island platform, doors will open on the left or right
-3	Eastbound	toward Al Mansoura
