= Al Bidda station =

Metro station in Doha, Qatar

Al Bidda metro station البدع محطة مترو

General information
- Location: Inside Al Bidda Park, Al Qurtubi Street, Doha; Qatar
- Coordinates: 25.29042°N 51.52025°E
- Owner: Qatar Rail
- Operator: Doha Metro
- Platforms: 2
- Tracks: 4

Construction
- Structure type: Underground
- Parking: Yes
- Accessible: Yes

Other information
- Website: http://www.qr.com.qa/

History
- Opened: 8 May 2019 for 10 December 2019 for

Services
Preceding station	Doha Metro	Following station
Corniche towards Lusail	Red Line	Msheireb towards Al Wakra or Hamad International Airport T1
The White Palace towards Al Riffa	Green Line	Msheireb towards Al Mansoura
Location

Al Bidda station is an interchange station between the Doha Metro's Green Line and the Red Line located in Al Bidda Park in the Al Bidda district. The station also serves Mushayrib, Fereej Bin Mahmoud, Rumeilah and Al Jasrah districts in Qatar's municipality of Doha.

The station currently has no metrolinks. Facilities on the premises include an Ooredoo self-service machine, restrooms and a prayer room.

== History ==
The station was opened to the public on 10 May 2019 along with the other Red Line stations.

== Connections ==
The station is served by bus routes 31, 34, 40, 41, 42, 45, 55, 56, 100, 101, 102, 102X, 104, 104A, 104B, 156, 156A, 170, 170A and 172.
