= The White Palace station =

Metro station in Doha, Qatar

The White Palace metro station القصر الأبيض محطة مترو

General information
- Location: Ahmed Bin Ali Street, Hamad Medical City, Doha; Qatar
- Coordinates: 25.29268°N 51.50649°E
- Owner: Qatar Rail
- Operator: Doha Metro
- Platforms: 2
- Tracks: 2

Construction
- Structure type: Underground
- Parking: Yes
- Accessible: Yes

Other information
- Website: http://www.qr.com.qa/

History
- Opened: 10 December 2019

Services
Preceding station	Doha Metro	Following station
Hamad Hospital towards Al Riffa	Green Line	Al Bidda towards Al Mansoura
Location

The White Palace station is a station on the Doha Metro's Green Line in Hamad Medical City in the municipality of Doha. The station serves the Hamad Medical City and the Rumeilah districts in the municipality. It is located on Ahmed Bin Ali Street in Hamad Medical City.

The station currently has no metrolinks. Facilities on the premises include restrooms and a prayer room.

== History ==
The station was opened to the public on 10 December 2019 along with the other stations of the Green Line, which is also known as the Education Line.

== Station layout ==
G	Street level	Exit/entrance
-1	Mezzanine	Fare control, ticket sales
-2	Concourse	Shops
-3	Westbound	toward Al Riffa
-3	Island platform, doors will open on the left or right
-3	Eastbound	toward Al Mansoura

== Connections ==
It is served by bus routes 40, 41, 42, 43, 45, 49, 55, 56, 104, 104A, 104B, 156 and 156A.
