= Al Rayyan Al Qadeem station =

Subway station in Doha, Qatar

Al Rayyan Al Qadeem Metro Station الريان القديم محطة مترو

General information
- Location: Al Rayyan Al Qadeem Street, Ar-Rayyan Municipality; Qatar
- Coordinates: 25.30152°N 51.46112°E
- Owner: Qatar Rail
- Operator: Doha Metro
- Platforms: 2
- Tracks: 2

Construction
- Structure type: Underground
- Parking: Yes
- Accessible: Yes

Other information
- Website: http://www.qr.com.qa/

History
- Opened: 10 December 2019

Services
Preceding station	Doha Metro	Following station
Al Shaqab towards Al Riffa	Green Line	Al Messila towards Al Mansoura
Location

Al Rayyan Al Qadeem station is a station on the Doha Metro's Green Line. It serves the municipality of Al Rayyan, specifically Old Al Rayyan, Lebday, and other suburbs of Al Rayyan City. It is situated on Al Rayyan Al Qadeem Street in the Lebday district.

No metrolink, which is the Doha Metro's free feeder bus network, currently services the station. Facilities on the premises include restrooms and a prayer room.

== History ==
The station was opened to the public on 10 December 2019 along with the other stations of the Green Line (also known as the Education Line).

== Connections ==
It is served by bus routes 40 and 45.

== Station layout ==
G	Street level	Exit/entrance
-1	Mezzanine	Fare control, ticket sales
-2	Concourse	Shops
-3	Westbound	toward Al Riffa
-3	Island platform, doors will open on the left or right
-3	Eastbound	toward Al Mansoura
