= Corniche station =

Metro station in Doha, Qatar

Corniche Metro Station

General information
- Location: Corniche, Next to Umbrella Park; Qatar
- Coordinates: 25.3078°N 51.5155°E
- Owner: Qatar Rail
- Operator: Doha Metro
- Platforms: 1
- Connections: MetroLink Bus

Construction
- Structure type: Underground
- Parking: Yes
- Accessible: Yes

Other information
- Website: http://www.qr.com.qa/

History
- Opened: 8 May 2019

Services
Preceding station	Doha Metro	Following station
West Bay towards Lusail	Red Line	Al Bidda towards Al Wakra
Location

Corniche Station of the Doha Metro's Red Line is located in the Corniche District in Doha, Qatar.

== History ==
As part of the Doha Metro's Phase 1, the station was inaugurated on 8 May 2019, along with most other Red Line stations.

== Station Details ==
Among the station's facilities are a QNB ATM, two prayer rooms and a restroom.

== Metrolink Bus ==
There are a total of two Metrolinks routes, which are part of the Doha Metro's feeder bus network, servicing the station:

- M143, leading to Al Jazeera Media Network, Al Ahli Hospital, Hamad Medical City and Civil Defense
- M144, leading to Madinat Khalifa North, Dahl Al Hamam & Umm Lekhba.
