= Lebday =

Lebday لبديع
- District
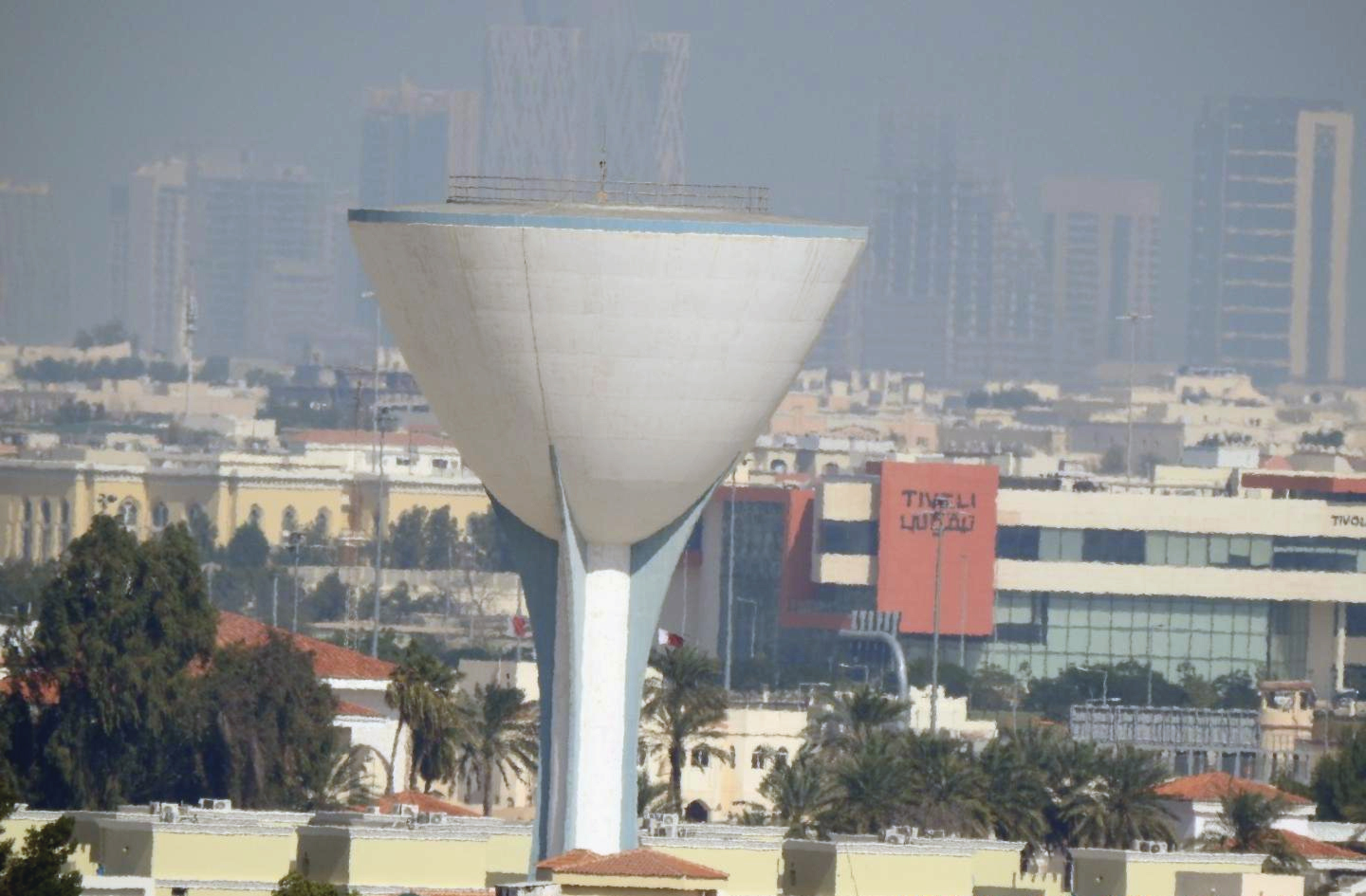
- View of Tivoli Group headquarters in Lebday

- Location within Qatar
- Coordinates: 25.304476°N 51.463459°E
- Country: Qatar
- Municipality: Al Rayyan
- Zone: Zone 52
- District no.: 64

Area
  - Total: 2.4 km^{2} (0.93 sq mi)
- Elevation: 26 m (85 ft)

Lebday (Arabic: لبديع; also spelled as Libdayya) is a Qatari district located in the municipality of Al Rayyan.

In the 2015 census, it was listed as a district of Zone no. 52 which has a population of 18,433 and also includes Al Shagub, Old Al Rayyan, Fereej Al Zaeem, and Al Luqta.

It borders Old Al Rayyan to the west and south, Al Messila and Madinat Khalifa South in Doha to the east, and Al Luqta to the north.

== Etymology ==
Lebday's name comes from the Arabic term al baday, which itself originates from badaa, meaning "to invent". This name was chosen for the area because when the first settlers discovered this previously uninhabited region, they "invented" a settlement, in a sense.

== Transport ==
The Al Rayyan Al Qadeem station in Lebday currently serves as the Green Line of the Doha Metro. The station was opened to the public on 10 December, 2019 along with the other Green Line stations. It is located on Al Rayyan Al Qadeem Street in Lebday, near the border with Old Al Rayyan.

The station currently has no metrolinks. Facilities on the premises include restrooms and a prayer room.
