= Fereej Al Zaeem =

Fereej Al Zaeem فريج الزعيم
- District
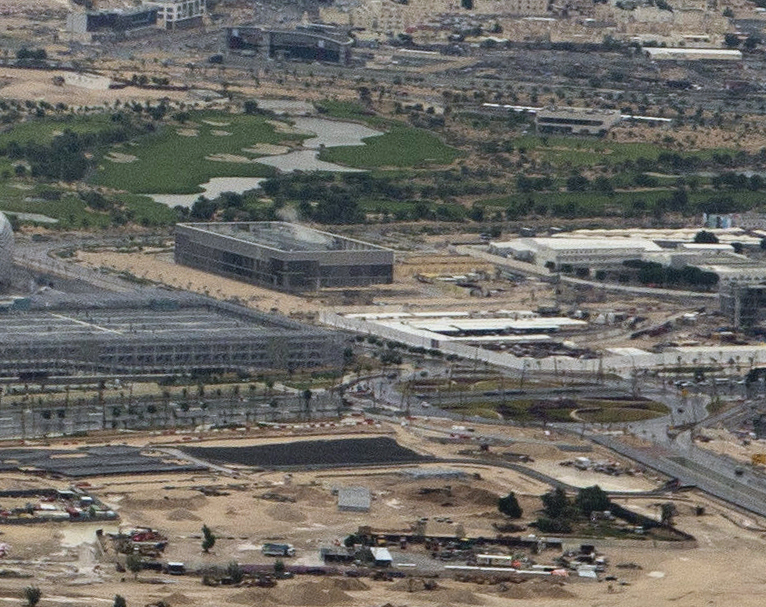
- Aerial view of Fereej Al Zaeem and Oxygen Park

- Location within Qatar
- Coordinates: 25.307678°N 51.418042°E
- Country: Qatar
- Municipality: Al Rayyan
- Zone: Zone 52
- District no.: 62

Area
  - Total: 1.8 km^{2} (0.69 sq mi)
- Elevation: 32 m (105 ft)

Fereej Al Zaeem (Arabic: فريج الزعيم) is a district in Qatar, located in the municipality of Al Rayyan. The Mathaf: Arab Museum of Modern Art is situated in the district as well as sections of Education City.

In the 2015 census, it was listed as a district of zone no. 52 which has a population of 18,433 and also includes Al Shagub, Old Al Rayyan, Lebday, and Al Luqta.

It borders Bani Hajer to the west, Gharrafat Al Rayyan to the north, Al Shagub to the east, and New Al Rayyan and Al Wajbah to the south.
