= Al Messila (Doha) =

Al Messila المسيلة
- District
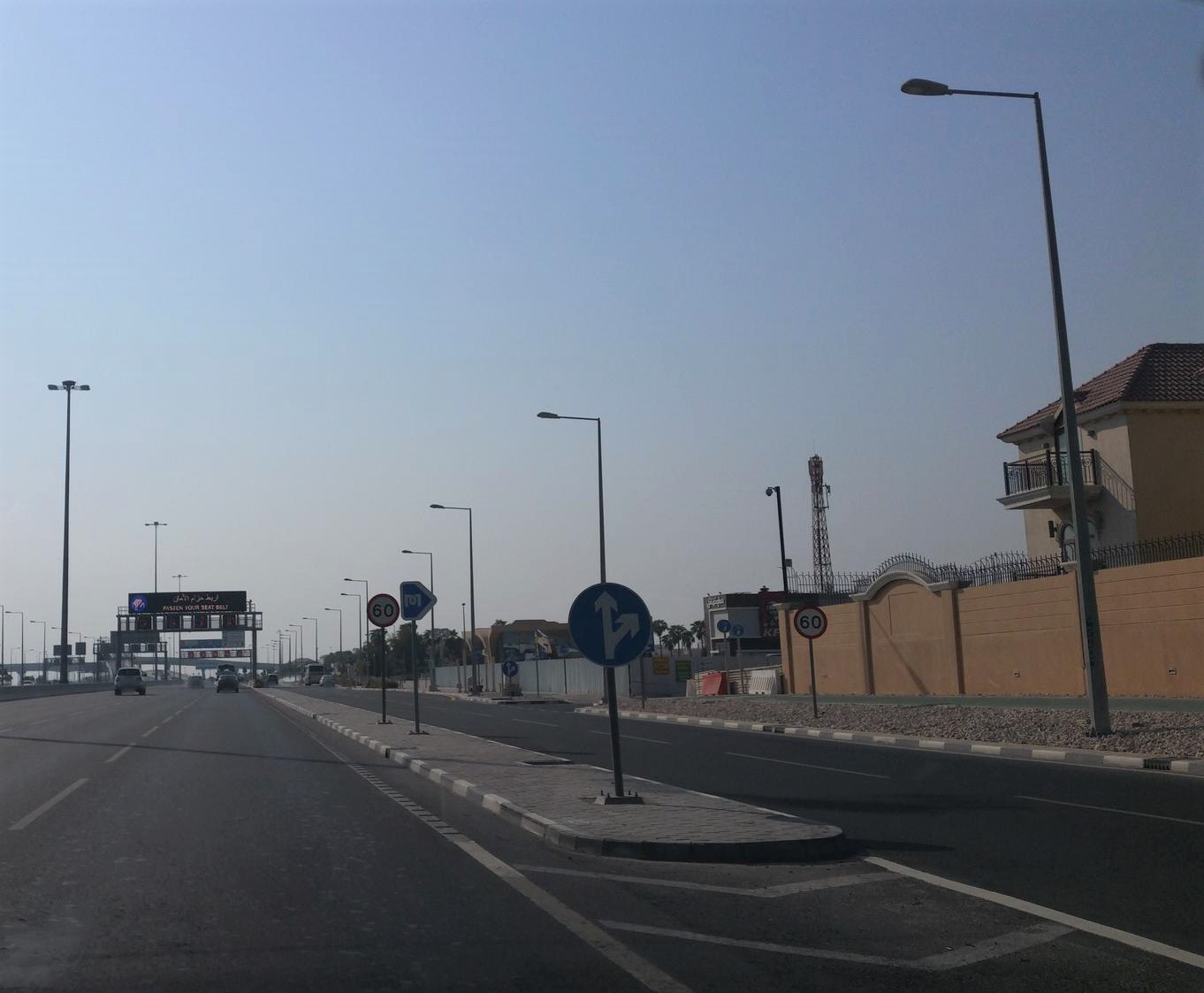
- Al Messila metro station off Al Rayyan Road.

- Location within Doha Location within Qatar
- Coordinates: 25°17′52″N 51°28′59″E
- Country: Qatar
- Municipality: Doha
- Zone: Zone 36
- District no.: 34

Area
  - Total: 2.1 km^{2} (0.81 sq mi)

Population
  - Total: 4,716
  - Density: 2,200/km^{2} (5,800/sq mi)

Al Messila (Arabic: المسيلة, romanized: Al-Misīlah) is a Qatari district in the municipality of Doha. For the most part, large gated compounds and schools occupy this district. It shares its western border with Lebday and Old Al Rayyan in Al Rayyan Municipality.

== History ==
Al Messila Race, a historic horse racing competition, used to take place here during the early 20th century. The competition was revived in 2019 as the Al Messila Traditional Horse Race.

== Geography ==
Al Messila borders the following districts:

- New Al Hitmi and Fereej Bin Omran to the east, separated by Jassim Bin Hamad Street.
- Madinat Khalifa South to the north, separated by Al Jazira Al Arabiya Street.
- Lebday and Old Al Rayyan to the west, separated by 22 February Street.
- Al Sadd to the south, separated by Al Rayyan Road.

== Landmarks ==
- Al Mesilla Compound on Al Rayyan Road.
- Al Rayyan Village on Jassim Bin Hamad Street.
- QIC Gardens on Al Murour Street.
- Granada Souq on Al Jazira Al Arabiya Street.

== Transport ==
Major roads that run through the district are Al Jazira Al Arabiya Street, Jassim Bin Hamad Street, 22 February Street, and Al Rayyan Road.

The underground Al Messila station currently serves the Green Line of the Doha Metro. The station was opened to the public on 10 December 2019 along with the other Green Line stations. It is located in Al Sadd on Al Rayyan Road, opposite Al Sadd's boundary with Al Messila.

== Demographics ==
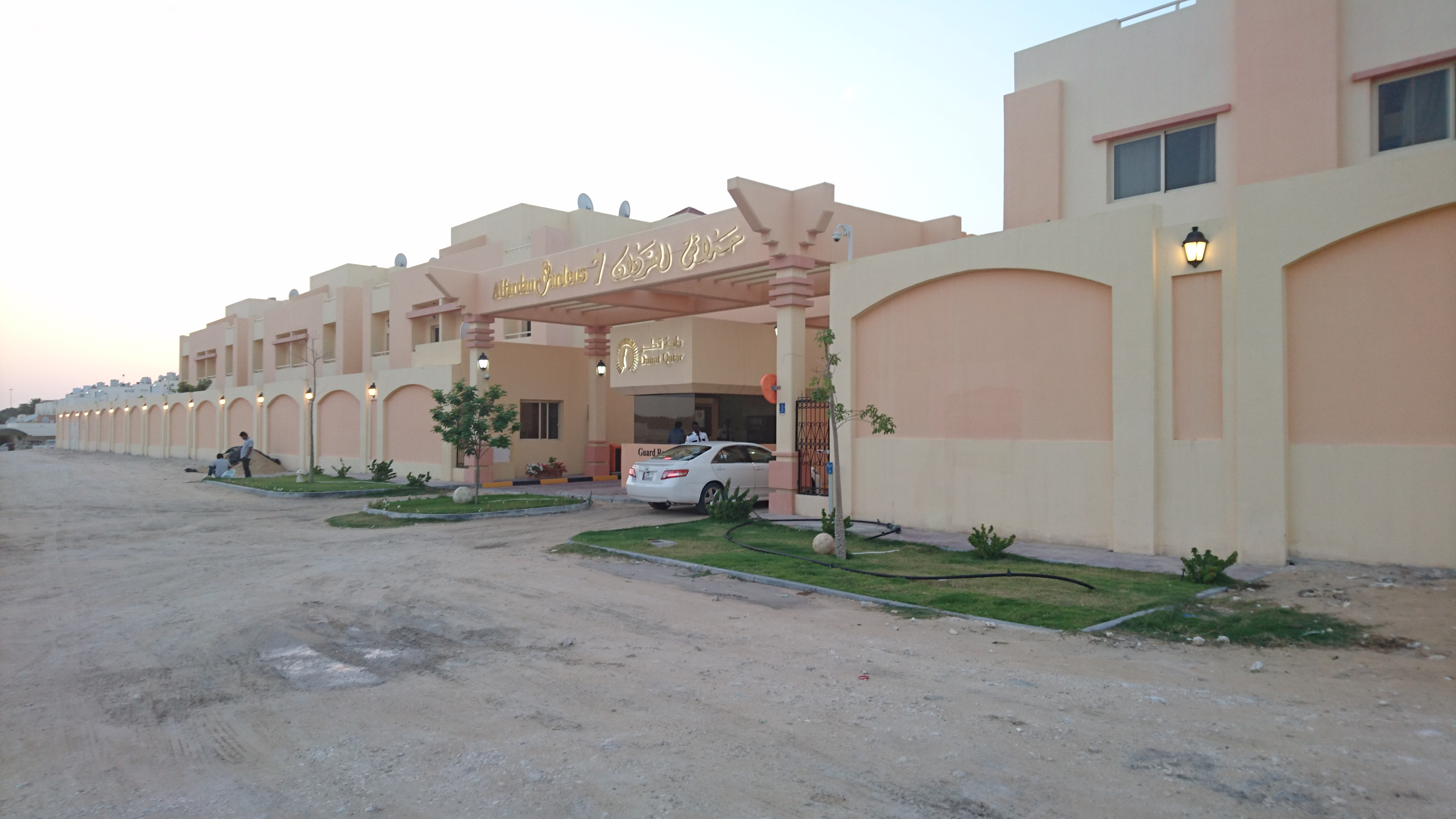
Al Fardan Gardens 7 in Al Messila.

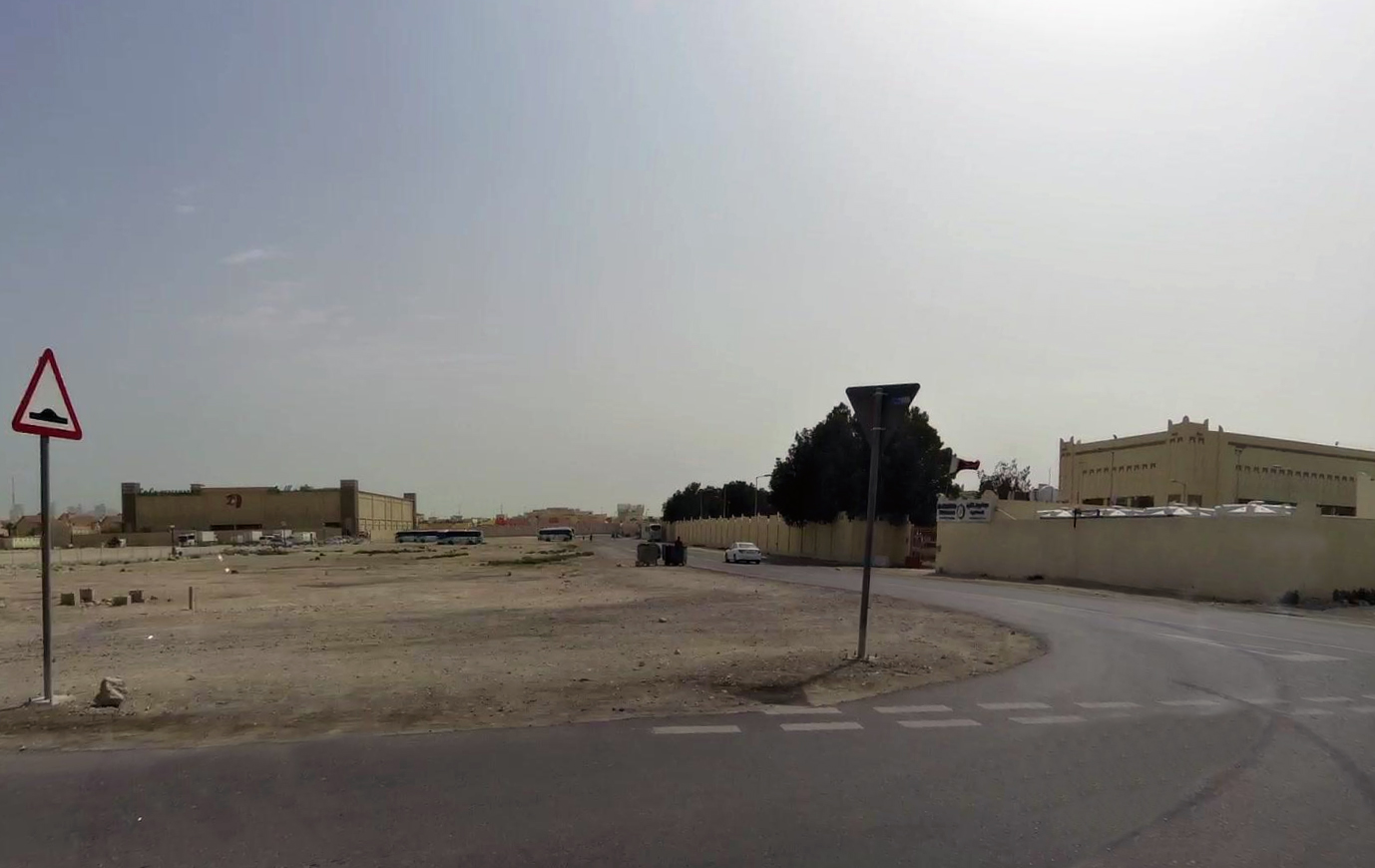
DeBakey High School and an under-construction LuLu Centre in Al Messila.

As of the 2010 census, the district comprised 973 housing units and 119 establishments. There were 4,716 people living in the district, of which 56% were male and 44% were female. Out of the 4,716 inhabitants, 70% were 20 years of age or older and 30% were under the age of 20. The literacy rate stood at 98%.

Employed persons made up 55% of the total population. Females accounted for 31% of the working population, while males accounted for 69% of the working population.

Year	Population
1986	1,460
1997	2,549
2004	2,982
2010	4,716

== Education ==
The following schools are located in Al Messila:

Name of School	Curriculum	Grade	Genders	Official Website	Ref
DeBakey High School for Health Professions	International	Primary – Secondary	Both	Official website	
English Modern School - Doha branch	International	Kindergarten – Secondary	Both	Official website	
