= Al Sadd =

Al Sadd may refer to:

- Al Sadd (Qatar), neighbourhood of Doha, Qatar
- Al Sadd SC, sports club based in the Al Sadd neighbourhood, Doha, Qatar
- Al-Sadd FC (Saudi Arabia), football club in Al-Kharj, Saudi Arabia
