= Education City =

Research hub in Al Rayyan, Doha, Qatar

Coordinates: 25°18′54″N 51°26′03″E

Education City المدينة التعليمية
- Campus
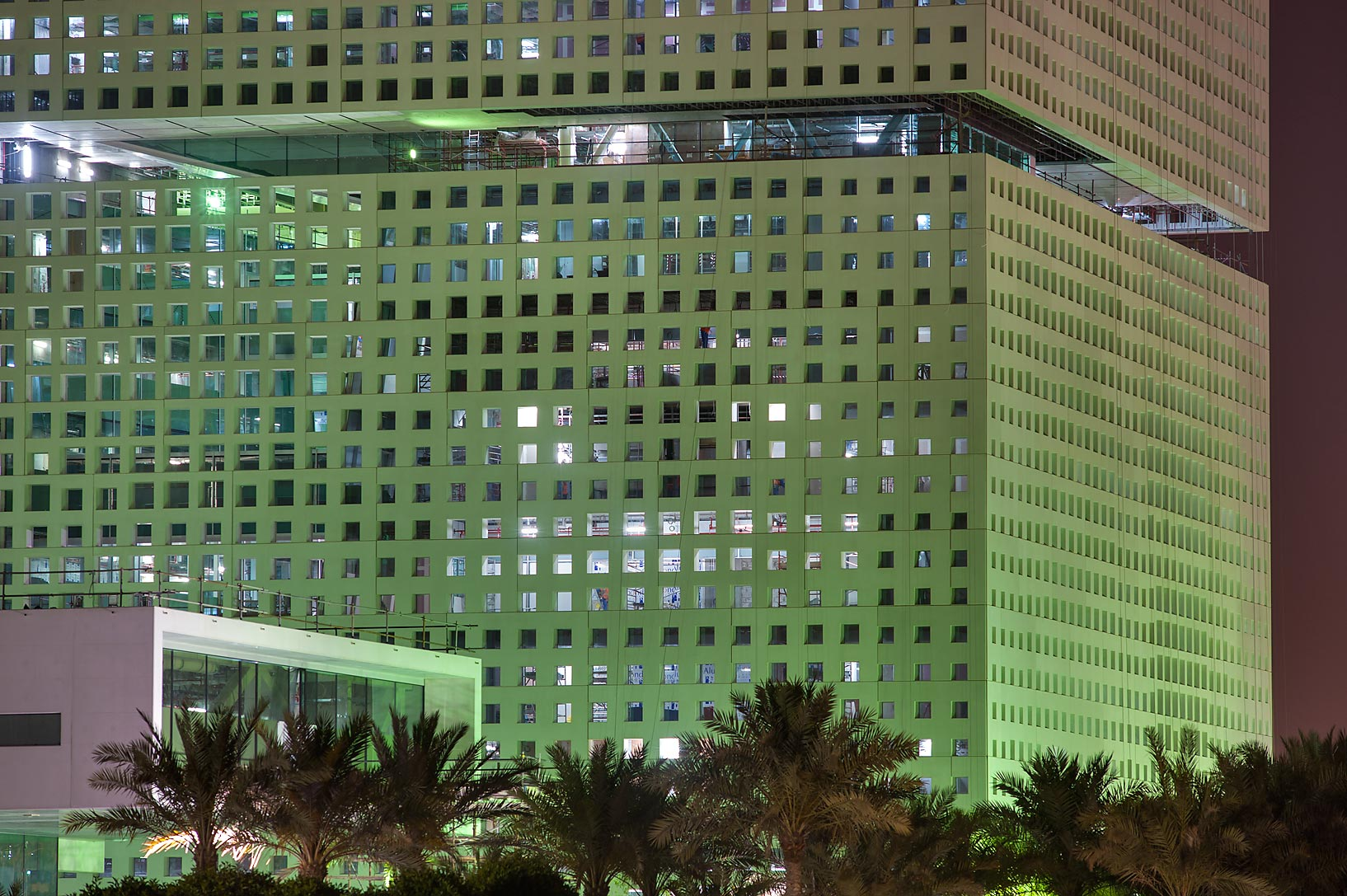
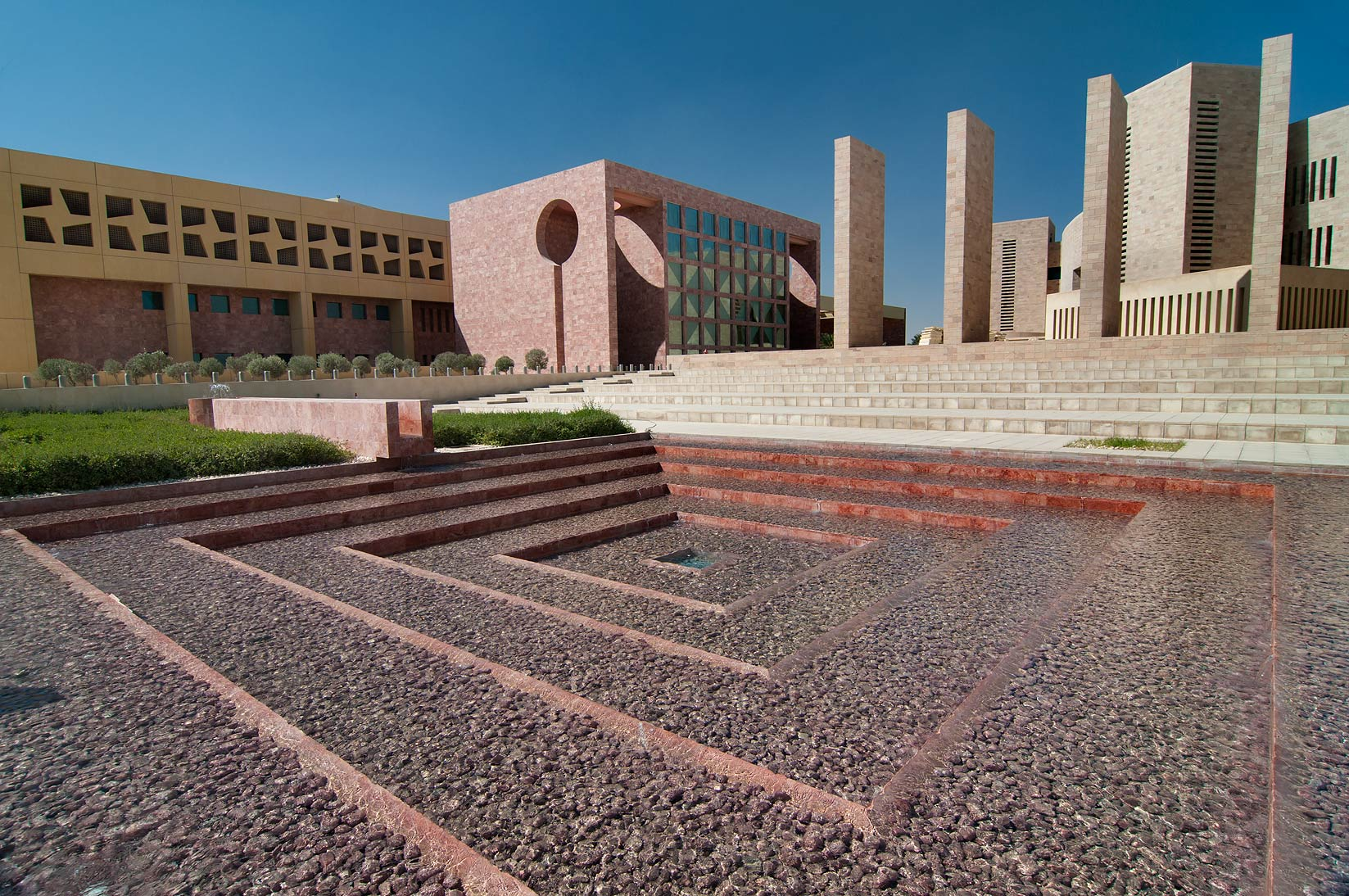
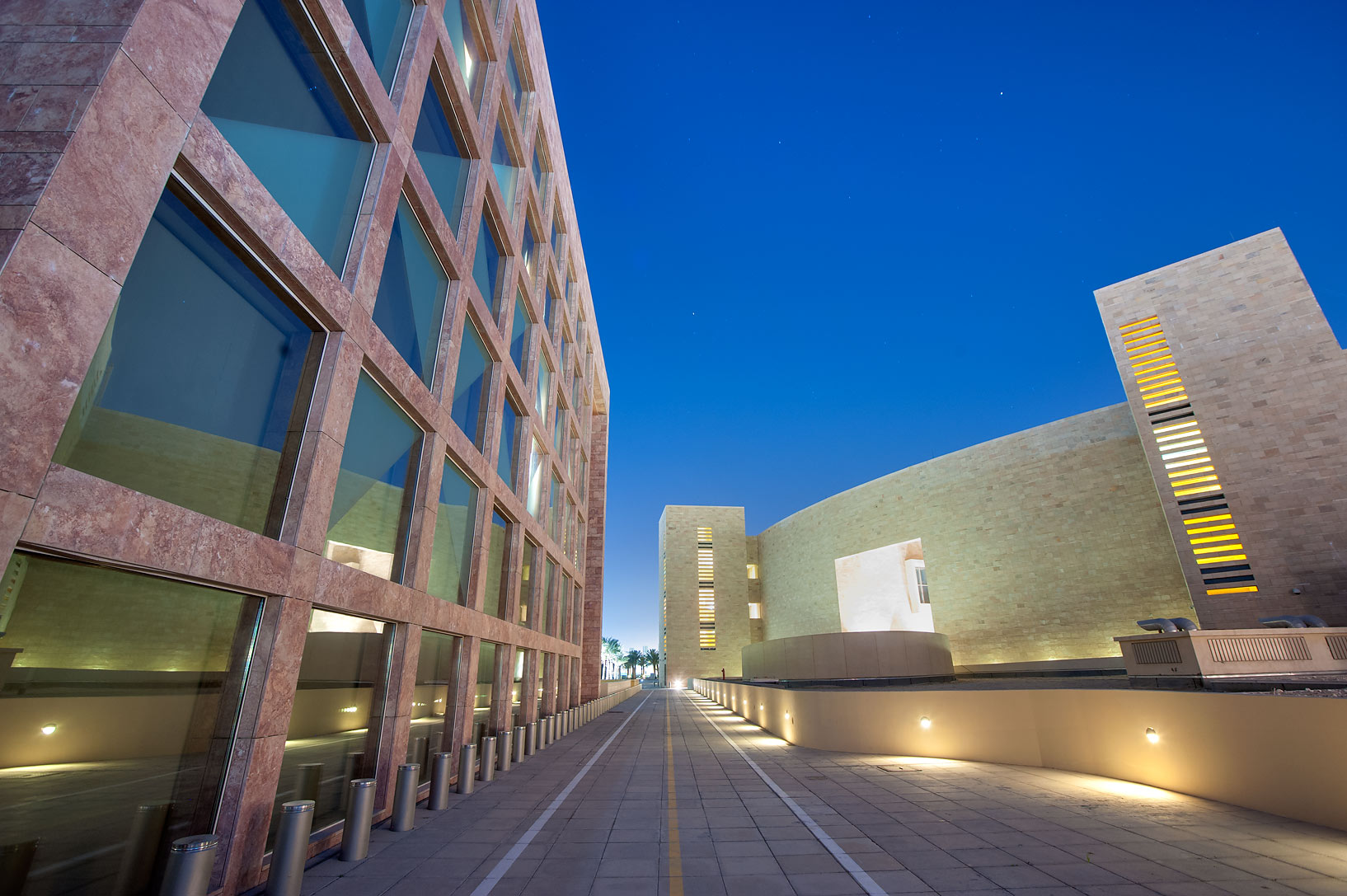
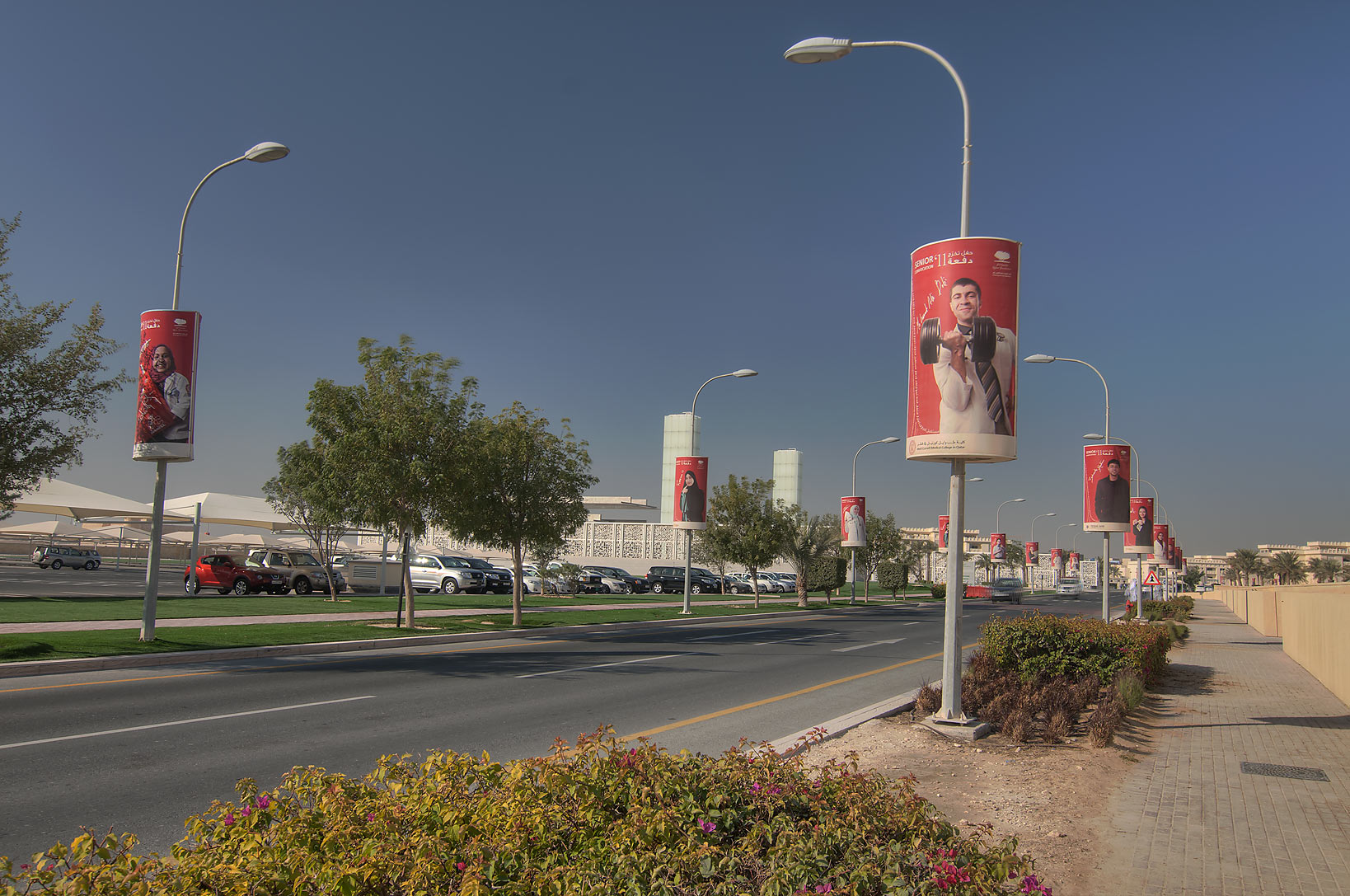
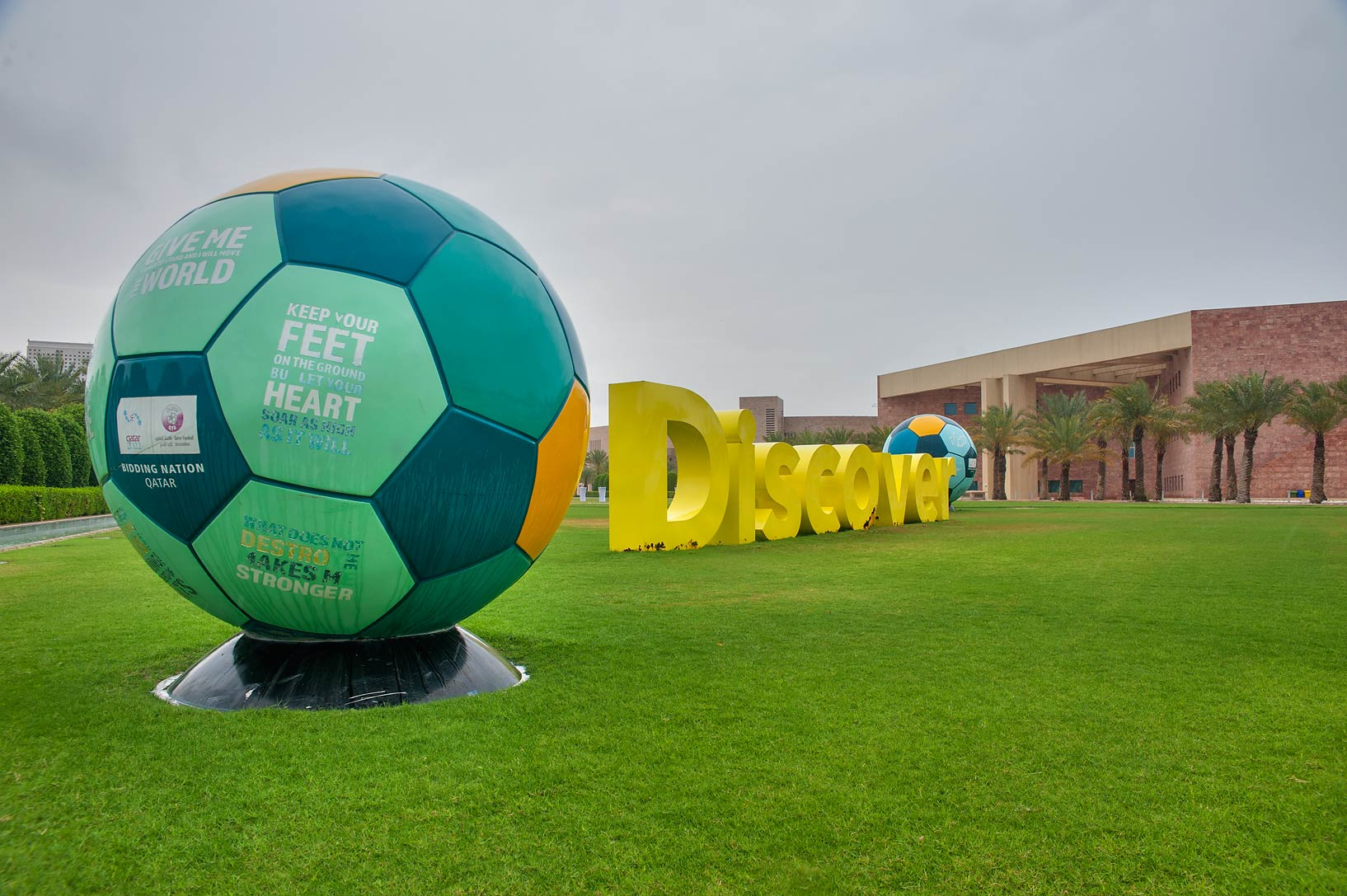
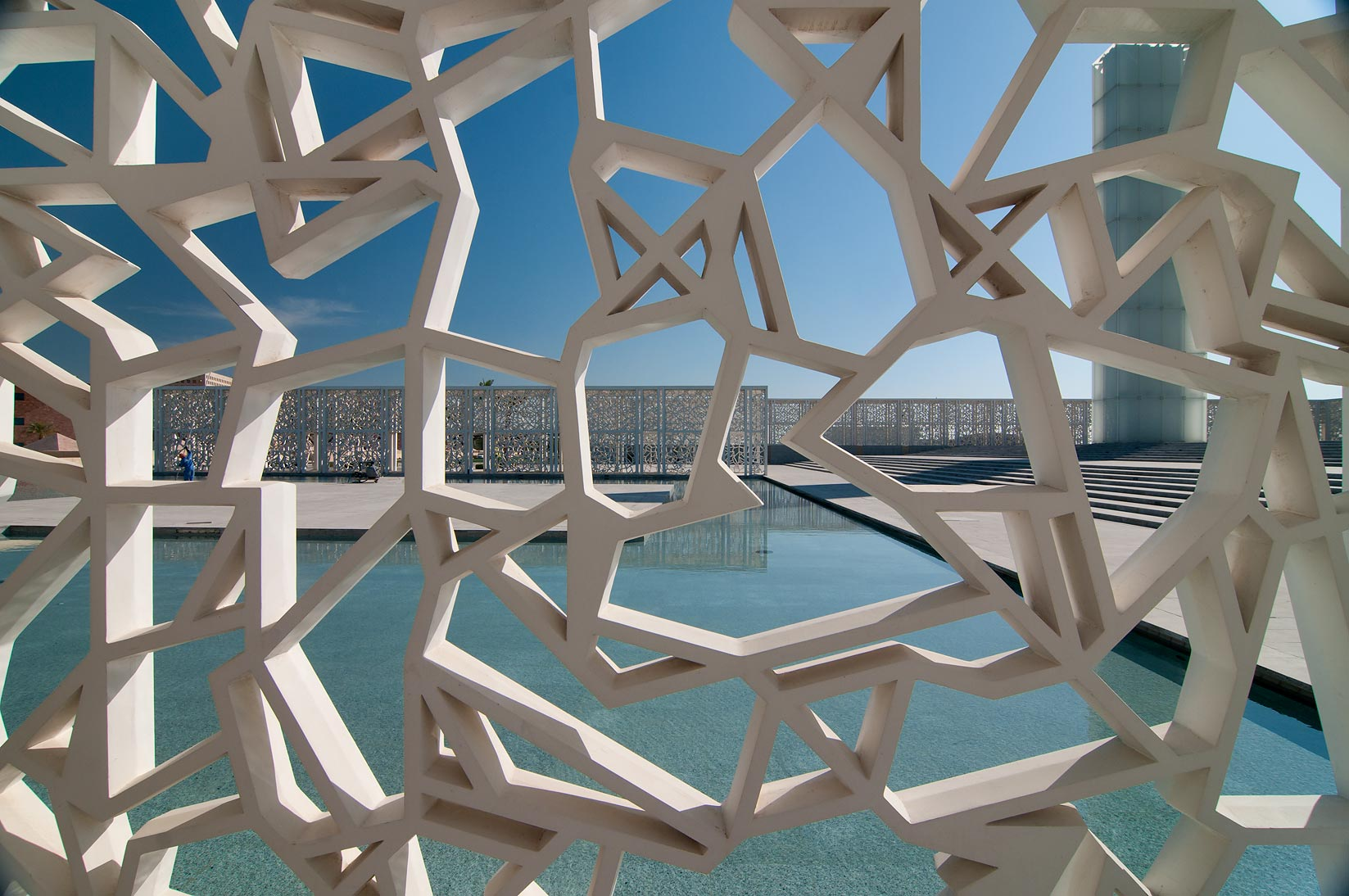
- Top to bottom and left to right: Qatar Foundation Headquarters under construction, the backyard of Carnegie Mellon University in Qatar, the bicycle path at Carnegie Mellon University in Qatar, Road in Education City, Discover art installation, Latticework at Ceremonial Court

- Location within Qatar
- Country: Qatar
- Municipality: Al Rayyan

Area
  - Total: 12 km^{2} (4.6 sq mi)
- Website: qf.org.qa/education-city

Education City is an educational and research hub located in Al Rayyan Municipality in the Doha Metropolitan Area of Qatar. Developed by the Qatar Foundation, it was established by Moza bint Nasser, one of the consorts of Qatar's former ruler Hamad bin Khalifa Al Thani and the current ruler's mother, to advance education, research, and innovation in the region. Spanning 12 square kilometres (4.6 sq mi), the property houses various educational facilities, including seven international partner universities and the locally founded Hamad Bin Khalifa University. Together, these institutions enroll over 4,000 students, and the student body is estimated to include students from Qatar and more than 100 other countries. By 2026, the alumni community of Education City had grown to approximately 12,000 members. Research on multilingual students at Education City confirmed that the international branch campuses offer English-language degree programmes, allowing Qatari students to obtain an international degree, without leaving the country. The same study stated that 75% of Qatari students at partner universities in Education City are women. Education City offers a variety of scholarships, and the Qatar Foundation provides interest-free loans to help students in need afford their education.

== History ==
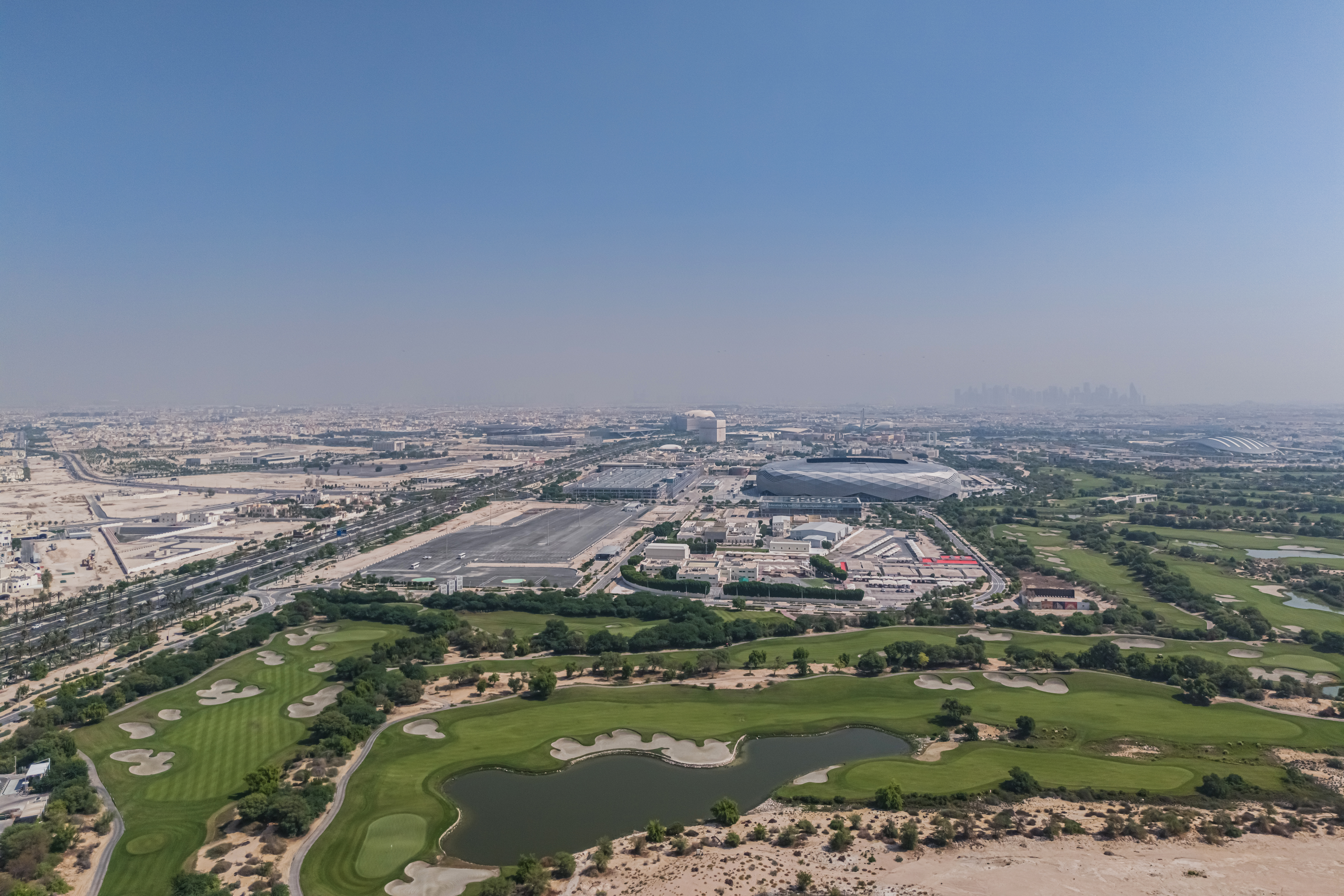
Aerial view of Education City in 2024

Education City was launched by Qatar Foundation in 1997. The following year, Virginia Commonwealth University became the first institute to establish itself on its campus. In 2001, Japanese architect Arata Isozaki was commissioned to design the master plan for Education City. Subsequently, the project underwent design modifications as the North and South campuses expanded. The city was officially inaugurated in 2003. Over the past 20 years, Education City has grown from a single school to a multi university campus with students from over 50 countries and an enormous research fund, offering significant opportunities for the advancement of knowledge and research across a variety of disciplines. Initially planned as a single university, Education City evolved into a partnership with international institutions tailored to Qatar’s needs. These partnerships offer students at any of the undergraduate campuses the opportunity to cross-register for courses at other institutions within the hub, allowing them to earn credits towards their degree. Each international campus has an area of expertise associated with its home university, providing complementary academic specialisms. Carnegie Mellon University specialises in business administration and computer science. Georgetown University covers foreign service, while Northwestern University focuses on journalism and Texas A&M University on engineering. Virginia Commonwealth University specialises in art and design. Weill Cornell Medicine offers medical programmes and the HEC Paris campus is considered to be a French business school. Mathaf: Arab Museum of Modern Art opened to the public on December 30, 2010 in a renovated former school building in Education City. Qatar National Convention Centre officially opened on December 4, 2011, with the 20th World Petroleum Congress, which drew more than 5,000 delegates. Following the Taliban's takeover of Afghanistan in 2021, Education City provided students, faculty, and staff at the American University of Afghanistan (AUAF) with the chance to relocate, allowing temporarily evacuated students to continue their studies in Qatar. AUAF now operates primarily as a virtual university. In 2024, applications for admission to Education City universities rose by 12%, according to a 2026 feature in NAFSA's International Educator.

== Institutions ==
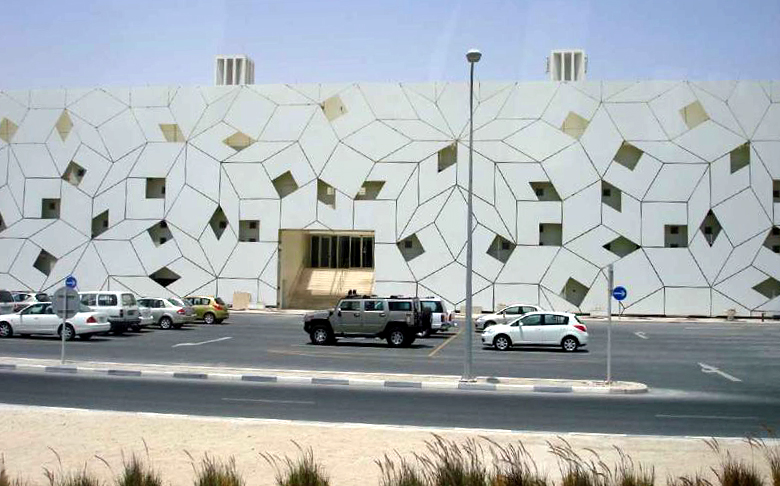
The Liberal Arts and Science Building, which houses classrooms for multiple schools.

Weill Cornell Medical College in Qatar in Education City

Education City is home to the following local Qatar university and seven international partner universities. According to the Washington Post, the Qatar Foundation covers all operating expenses for the branch campuses. In their agreement, QF and the universities set out that the main universities retain control over hiring and admissions, and that the branches will uphold the academic freedom and quality standards of their home universities.

- Carnegie Mellon University in Qatar (CMU-Q). CMU-Q joined Education City in 2004. CMU-Q offers undergraduate programs in Biological Sciences, Business Administration, Computational Biology, Computer Science, and Information Systems. In May 2025, CMU-Q and the Qatar Foundation renewed their partnership for a further ten years. That year, CMU-Q reported that it had graduated approximately 1,400 students in its undergraduate degree programmes and was currently housing more than 450 students from over 60 different countries. Of these students, 56% were female.
- Georgetown University in Qatar (GU-Q). GU-Q was established in 2005. It offers a four-year Bachelor of Science in Foreign Service degree in one of five majors: International Economics, International Politics, Culture and Politics, International History, and Science, Technology and International Affairs. It also offers the Executive Master’s in Diplomacy and International Affairs and serves as a residency location for the Executive Master’s in Humanitarian Crises and Emergency Management. By April 2025, nearly 1,100 students had graduated from GU-Q’s undergraduate and master’s programmes. In April 2025, Georgetown University and Qatar Foundation renewed their agreement to continue operating the campus for a further ten years.
- Hamad Bin Khalifa University (HBKU). HBKU was founded in 2010. It houses three national research institutes: Qatar Biomedical Research Institute, Qatar Computing Research Institute, and Qatar Environment and Energy Research Institute. Their research focuses on challenges related to healthcare, computing, energy, water and the environment. HBKU's academic portfolio is tailored to meet the needs of the local community, inspiring Qataris to continue their pursuit of education with a diverse offering of degrees, Master's programs, and PhD courses. HBKU's educational efforts comprise five colleges and an entity devoted to executive education: the College of Health and Life Sciences, College of Humanities & Social Sciences, College of Islamic Studies, College of Law & Public Policy, College of Science & Engineering, and the Executive Education Center.
- HEC Paris in Qatar joined Qatar Foundation as Education City’s first European partner in 2010. It inaugurated new premises in Msheireb Downtown Doha in November 2021, and the partnership was renewed for a further ten years in 2024. Courses on offer include Master's programs, Summer School, MBA, PhD, Executive MBA, TRIUM Global Executive MBA, executive short programs, and customized executive education programs for companies. HEC Paris launched Qatar's first international Executive MBA, and also provides a Specialized master's degree in strategic business unit management.
- Northwestern University in Qatar (NU-Q). NU-Q was founded in 2008 and offers Bachelor of Science degrees in Journalism and Strategic Communication, and Communication. It also offers students the opportunity to earn a minor in Middle East Studies and a minor in Media and Politics. Additionally, students can earn a certificate in Strategic Communication. NU-Q partnered with Al Jazeera for collaboration and knowledge transfer. However, NU-Q ended its collaboration with the network, as confirmed by a university spokesperson. The decision came after U.S. political pressures and claims linking Al Jazeera to Hamas.
- Texas A&M University at Qatar (TAMUQ). TAMUQ's campus was established in 2003. The university offers Bachelor of Science degrees in Chemical Engineering, Electrical Engineering, Mechanical Engineering, and Petroleum Engineering. The university began offering graduate degree programs in Chemical Engineering in 2011. Over 1,000 students have graduated from TAMUQ. On February 8, 2024, the Texas A&M Board of Regents voted to close TAMUQ by 2028, citing regional instability and a desire to focus on U.S. campuses. The decision followed concerns raised by a think tank about national security risks and controversy over academic restructuring. The Qatar Foundation called the closure “misguided,” attributing it to a “disinformation campaign” and highlighting the partnership’s significant benefits for both Qatar and the U.S.
- Virginia Commonwealth University School of the Arts in Qatar School of the Arts (VCUarts Qatar). Established in 1998, VCUarts Qatar was the first international partner university to open in Education City. VCUarts Qatar offers degrees in fashion design, graphic design, interior design and painting and printmaking, a Bachelor of Arts degree in art history, and a Master of Fine Arts degree in design. The contract between Qatar Foundation and Virginia Commonwealth University (VCU) came into effect in June 2012.
- Weill Cornell Medicine - Qatar (WCM-Q). WCM-Q was established in 2001 as a partnership between Cornell University and Qatar Foundation. WCM-Q's innovative six-year program of studies leads to the Cornell University MD degree.
- University College London opened a campus in Qatar in 2010 and after it ended its 10-year contract, UCL left Education City on June 30, 2020. It used to offer a MA in Library and Information Studies and an MA in Museum and Gallery Practice.

Other educational centers located at Education City include:

- Qatar Academy (QA) Doha was established in 1995, as Qatar Foundation's first school. It is an International Baccalaureate (IB) World School, accredited by the New England Association of Schools and Colleges, and the Council of International Schools. There are five Qatar Academy schools in different locations throughout Qatar, including QA Al Khor, QA Al Wakra QA Msheireb, and QA Sidra.
- Academic Bridge Program (ABP) was established in 2001 and is a rigorous, two-semester general studies program that focuses on English, math, science, and computer skills. Studies in these four areas help ensure students make a successful transition from high school to university.
- Awsaj Academy was established in 1996 and is a K-12 specialized school that addresses the needs of students with mild to moderate learning challenges.
- Renad Academy was launched in 2016, helping children who have been diagnosed with mild to moderate Autism Spectrum Disorder (ASD).
- Qatar Leadership Academy (QLA) opened in 2005. QLA follows a US curriculum model, with a full high school program in grades 8–12.

=== Research ===
Several research institutions are based in Education City, including:

- Sidra Medicine, formerly known as the Sidra Medical and Research Center, is a hospital and biomedical research center. The opening of its main hospital building took place on 14 January 2018. In May 2024, Sidra Medicine announced a collaboration with the Children’s Hospital of Philadelphia (CHOP) to establish Qatar’s first paediatric haematopoietic stem cell transplant programme, also known as a bone marrow transplant programme. In December 2025, Sidra Medicine reported its first success after opening its dedicated HSCT ward.
- The Qatar Biomedical Research Institute (QBRI), established in 2012, conducts translational biomedical research and biotechnology focused on preventing, diagnosing and treating diseases such as diabetes, neurological disorders and cancer. The institute's seven core facilities include centres for stem cell research, genomics, proteomics, structural biology, flow cytometry, advanced microscopy and imaging, and clinical research.
- The Qatar Computing Research Institute (QCRI) was established in 2010. It focuses on multidisciplinary computing research, including Arabic-language technologies, data analytics, and cyber security.
- The Qatar Environmental and Energy Research Institute (QEERI) conducts research on energy, water, and environmental challenges in Qatar and other arid regions. This includes projects working on desalination, solar energy, and sustainable agriculture.
- Qatar Science and Technology Park was launched on 16 March 2009. According to trade reports, the park provides office and laboratory space for companies and start-ups, as well as funding, mentoring, and programmes to prepare technology for commercialisation. The park aims to enable graduates from the universities in Education City to pursue a career in research. As a free trade zone, QSTP exempts companies based there from tax and duties. They can also operate independently without a local agent. However, companies must make technology development their main activity.
- The Qatar Precision Health Institute (QPHI) builds on the work of the Qatar Biobank and the Qatar Genome Programme, aiming to advance precision healthcare through genomic and multi-omics research. According to QPHI's own statements, its research has contributed to improving the representation of Arab populations in genomic research, an area in which they have historically been underrepresented. The institute's main office is located at the QSTP.

== Campus and facilities ==
The National Library of Qatar opened in 2017 in Education City. Its collection contains over a million books, and it also provides study spaces and a separate cultural heritage collection. Designed by the Dutch architectural firm OMA, the building covers an area of 485,000 square feet (45,100 m^{2}).

Multaqa is Education City's main student center, hosting educational, cultural, social and recreational activities for students of Hamad Bin Khalifa University and Qatar Foundation's partner universities.

Oxygen Park is a 13-hectare public park containing sports pitches and a 1.6 kilometres (0.99 mi) running track that passes through covered walkways and cooled tunnel sections.

The Media Majlis opened at Northwestern University in Qatar in 2019 as a museum devoted to journalism and media, with its exhibitions and public programs exploring media from multiple perspectives.

More than 150 pieces of public art are installed throughout Education City as part of Qatar Foundation's collection, which includes works by Qatari, Arab and international artists.

Torba Farmers Market opened at Education City's Ceremonial Court in November 2017 as a seasonal public market for locally grown produce, homemade food products, handicrafts and gardening supplies.

Al-Mujadilah, a purpose-built mosque for women, opened in Education City in January 2024. It incorporates a library and an education centre intended as a forum for learning. The mosque was designed by Diller Scofidio + Renfro for its founder, Her Highness Sheikha Moza bint Nasser.

Education City Stadium was completed in 2020 after four years of construction work. With a capacity of 44,667 spectators, the stadium has hosted several events in the past, including the Arab Nations Cup and the 2022 FIFA World Cup. However, its primary purpose is to serve students from the surrounding universities.

== Transport ==
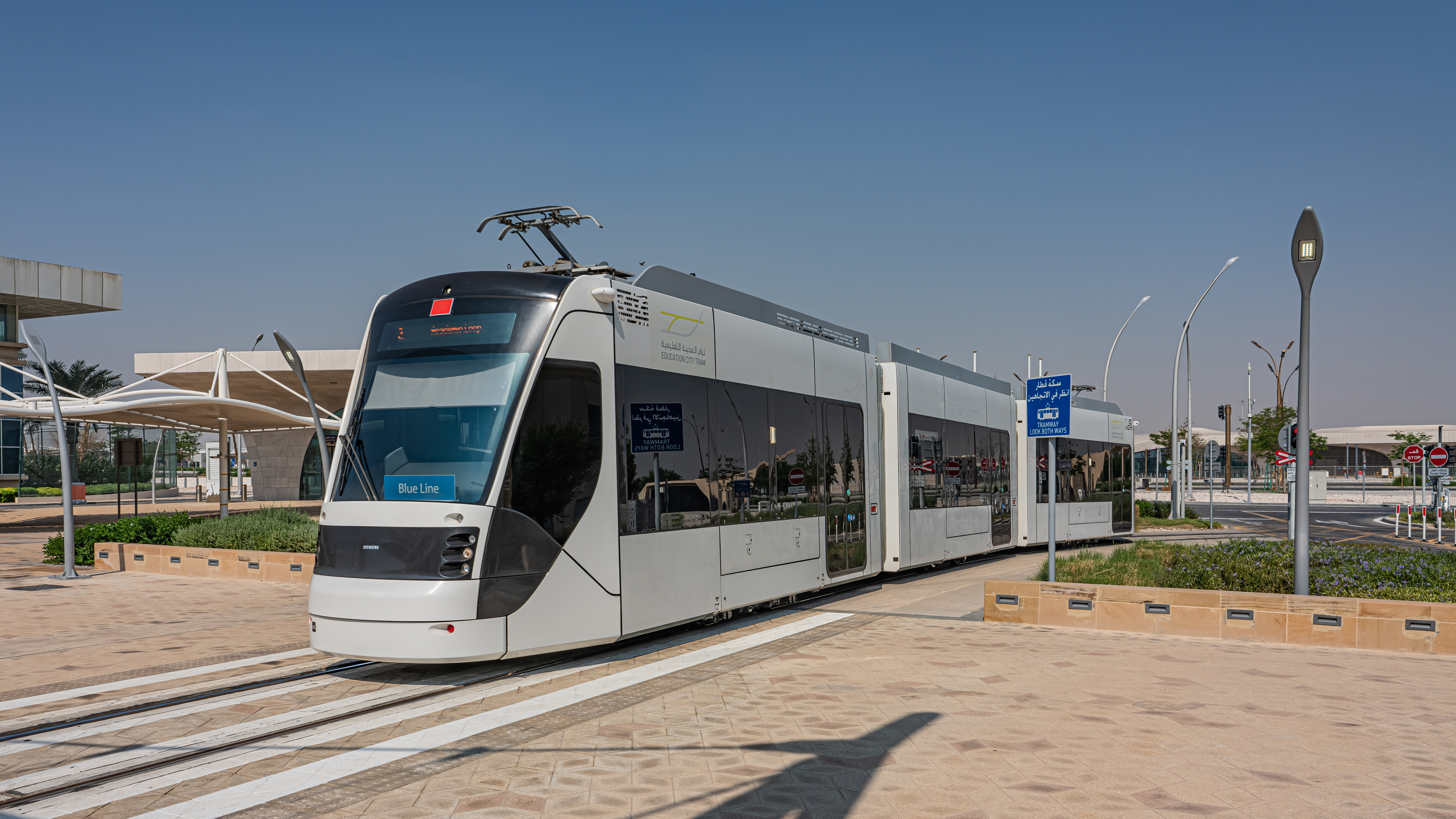
Education City Tram in operation in 2024

Three separate stations of the Doha Metro's Green Line (also known as the Education Line) serve Education City: the Education City station, the Qatar National Library station, and the Al Shaqab station. All three stations were opened to the public on 10 December 2019.

The Education City Tram offers free rides within the campus. The tram has three lines: Yellow, Blue, and Green. The Yellow and Blue Lines serve the South Campus, while the Green Line connects the North Campus. It is designed to enhance connectivity and reduce the campus's carbon footprint. Public bus service is also offered.

== Controversy ==
American universities which have established campuses in Education City have been the subject of ongoing criticism of whether it is appropriate to maintain a campus in Qatar, given the alleged Qatari links to state-sponsored terrorism, the lack of freedom of speech in the country and the country's absolute monarchy. In an interview with Gulf News Journal, Herbert London, president of the London Center for Policy Research, said "universities I think have compromised themselves" by having campuses in a country like Qatar where academic freedom and freedom of the press are severely limited.
