= Al Sadd (Qatar) =

Al Sadd اَلسَّدّ
- District
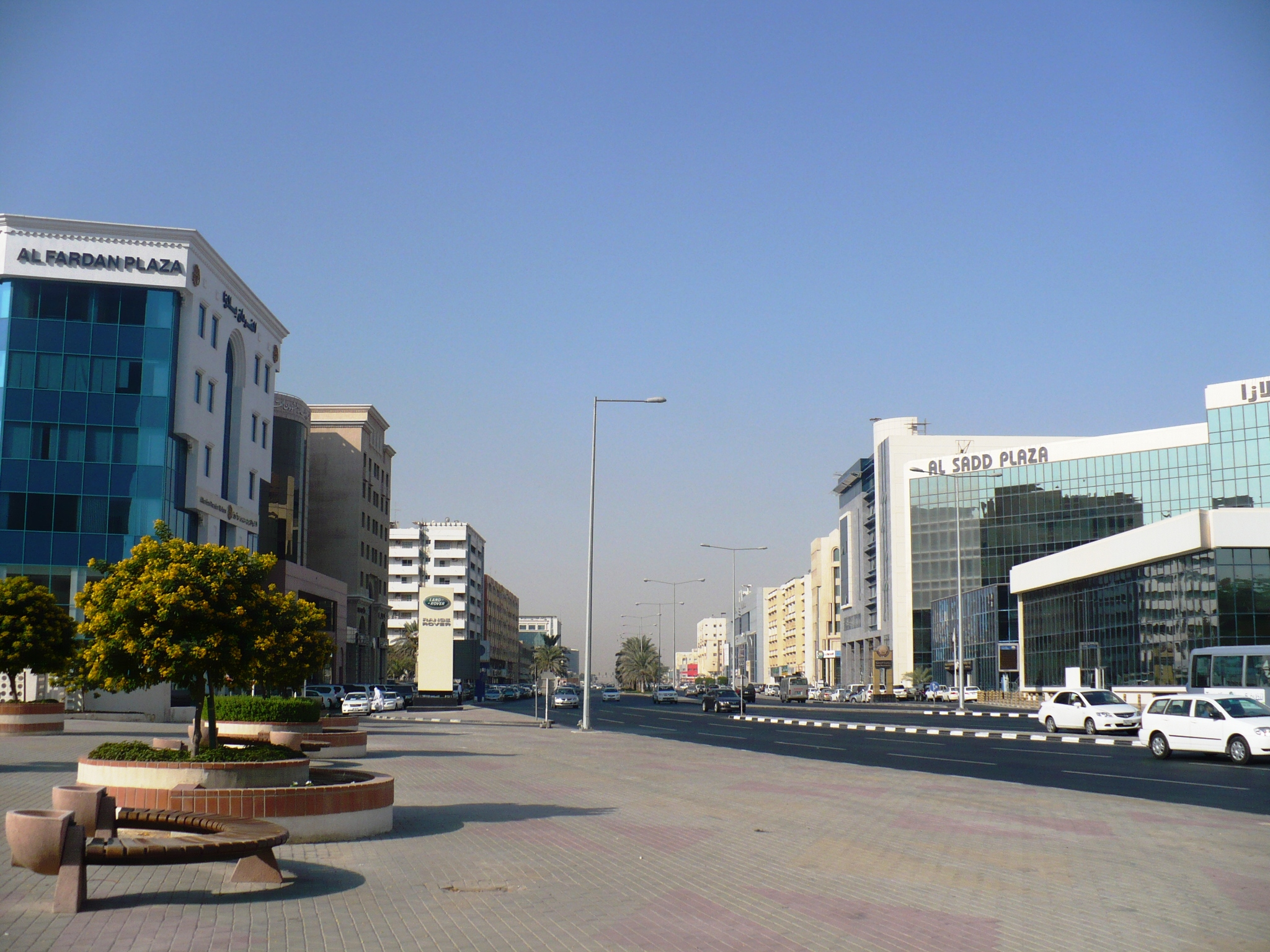
- Al Fardan Plaza (left) and Al Sadd Plaza (right)

- Location within Doha Location within Qatar
- Coordinates: 25°17′10″N 51°30′17″E
- Country: Qatar
- Municipality: Doha
- Zone: Zone 38, Zone 39
- District no.: 38

Area
  - Total: 3.5 km^{2} (1.4 sq mi)

Population (2010)
  - Total: 14,113
  - Density: 4,000/km^{2} (10,000/sq mi)

Al Sadd (Arabic: اَلسَّدّ, romanized: As Sadd) is a neighborhood of Doha, the capital city of Qatar. The football team Al-Sadd and the Al-Sadd Sports Complex are located here. Rumeilah Hospital and The Children's Hospital are also based in the district.

Since the start of the 21st century, the district has witnessed massive development, resulting in the addition of thousands of residential units and a skyline dominated by Western-style high rises.

== Etymology ==
A plant known locally as sadd which is noted for thriving in Qatar's eastern section, particularly on the coast, gave the district its name.

== History ==
The Darb Al Saai festival, held in the days preceding Qatar National Day, was held here prior to being relocated to Umm Salal Mohammed in 2022.

== Geography ==
Al Sadd borders the following districts:

- Hamad Medical City, New Al Hitmi and Al Messila to the north, separated by Al Rayyan Road.
- Fereej Bin Mahmoud to the east, separated by Suhaim Bin Hamad Street.
- New Al Mirqab and Fereej Al Nasr to the south, separated by Al Mirqab Al Jadeed Street.
- Fereej Al Amir and Fereej Al Soudan in Al Rayyan Municipality to the west, separated by Al Amir Street.

== Transport ==
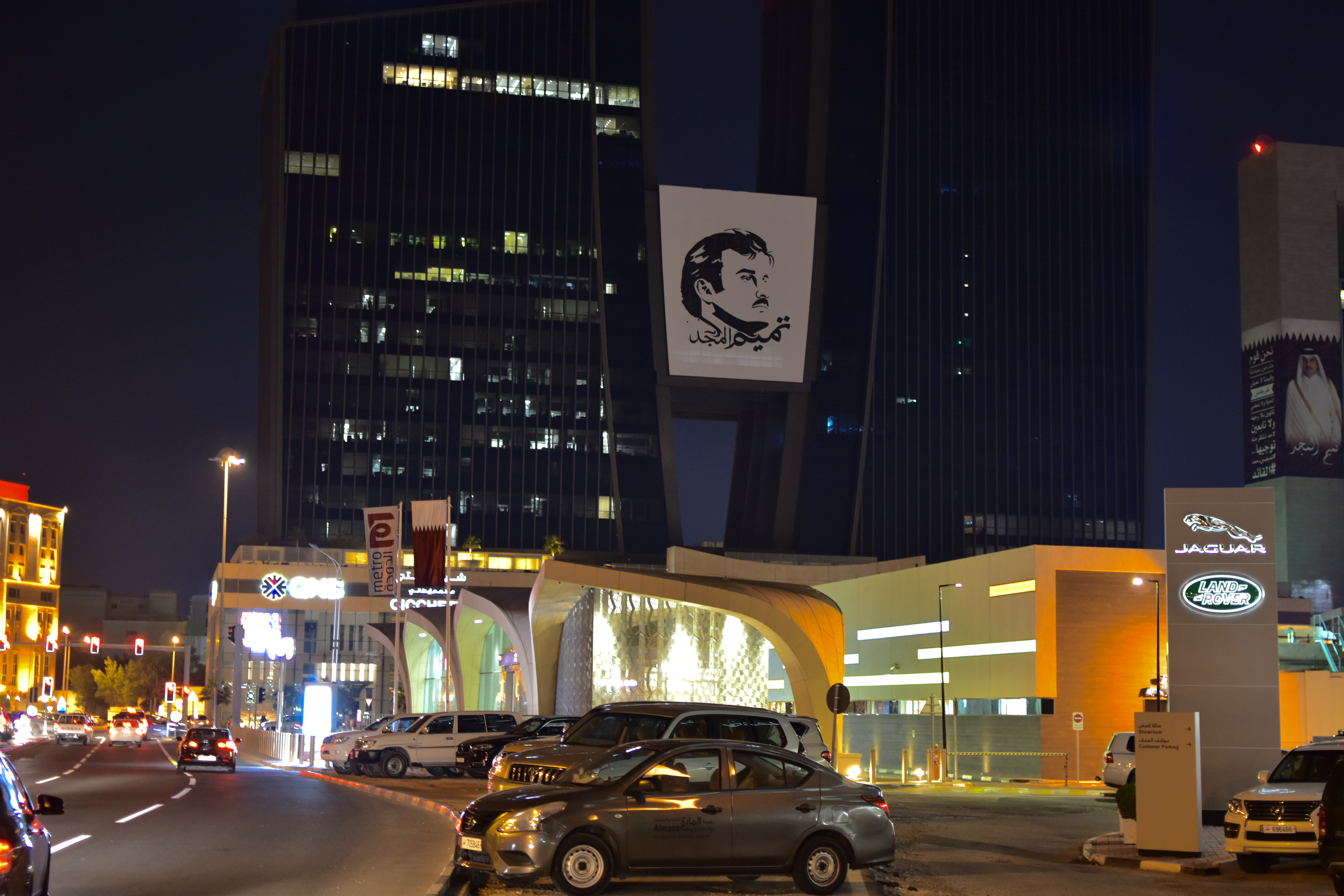
Al Sadd Metro Station in 2020.

=== Road ===
Major roads that run through the district are Al Sadd Street, Suhaim Bin Hamad Street, Al Amir Street and Al Rayyan Road.

Mowasalat is the official transport company in Qatar and serves the community through its operation of public bus routes. Al Sadd is served by one bus line which departs from Al Ghanim Bus Station. Route 32 has stops at Al Sadd and Villaggio Mall and a terminus on Street 1 in the Industrial Area, running at a frequency of every 20 minutes on all days of the week.

=== Rail ===
Doha Metro's Gold Line, which officially opened on 21 November 2019, runs through Al Sadd in an east-to-west direction. Al Sadd Metro Station is located at the intersection of Al Sadd and C Ring Road, while the Joaan Metro Station is westward on Al Sadd Street.

Located in Al Sadd on Al Rayyan Road, opposite of Al Sadd's boundary with Al Messila, the underground Al Messila station currently serves the Green Line of the Doha Metro. The station was opened to the public on 10 December 2019 along with the other Green Line stations.

== Sports ==
The neighborhood is represented by Al Sadd SC, a multisports club formed in 1969.

== Landmarks ==
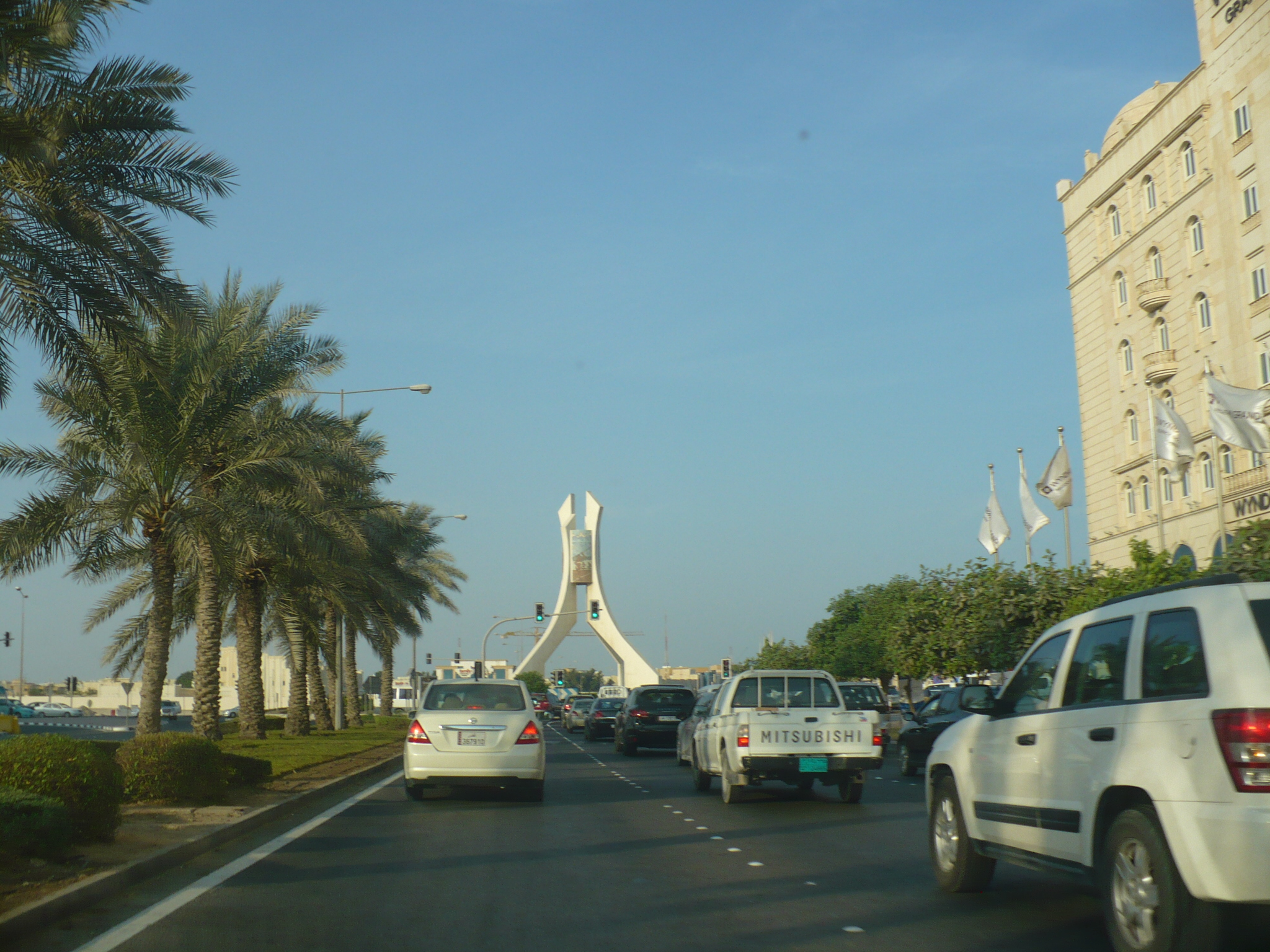
Sports Roundabout in Al Sadd.

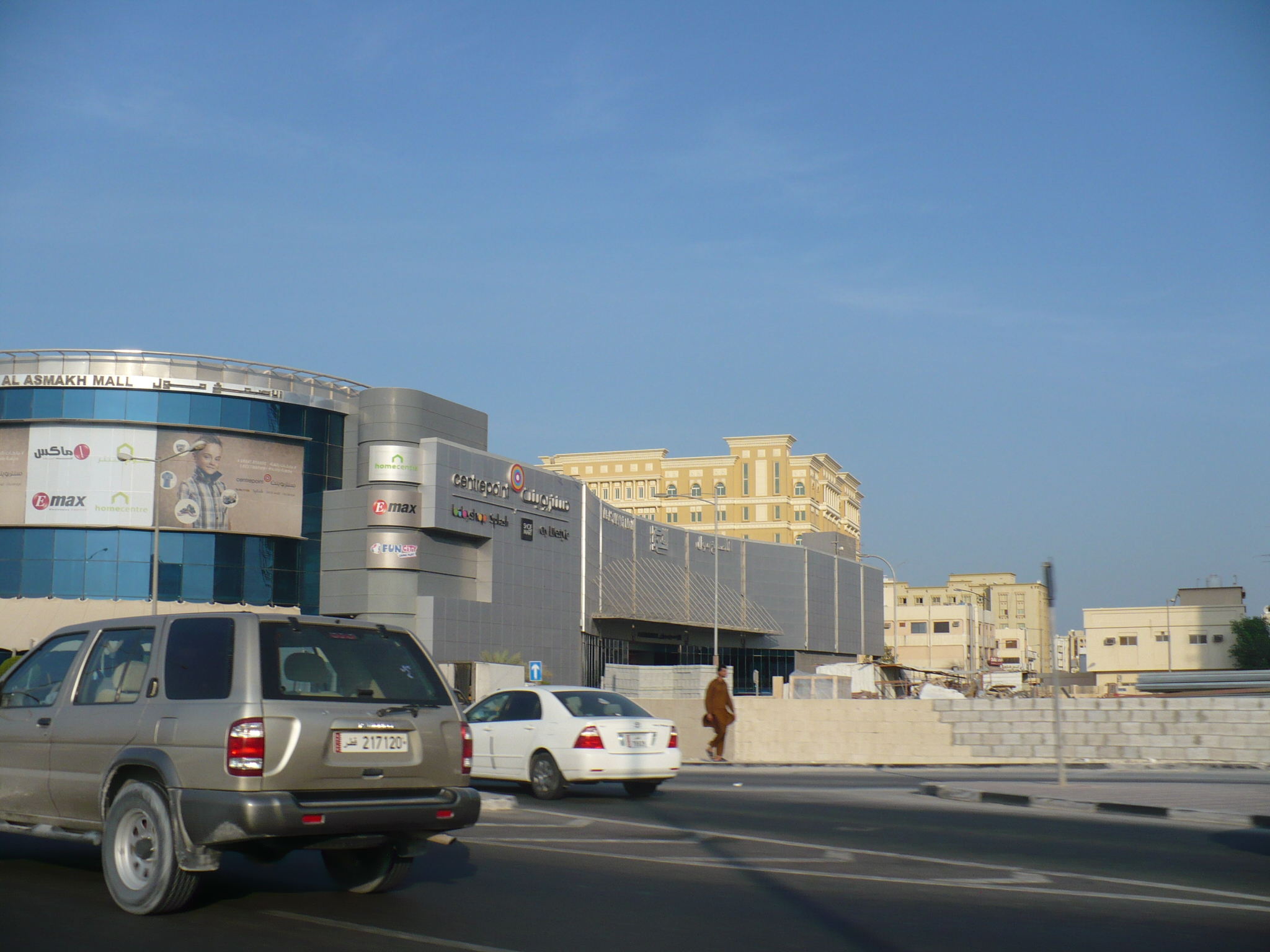
Centrepoint Mall in Al Sadd.

- Jassim bin Hamad Stadium, home to Al Sadd SC's football team
- Ali Bin Hamad al-Attiyah Arena
- Wyndham Grand Regency Doha Hotel
- Centrepoint Mall, also known as Al Asmakh Mall
- LuLu Center
- Al Rumeilah Hospital
- Sports Roundabout
- Royal Plaza
- Al Sadd Plaza

== Qatar National Master Plan ==
The Qatar National Master Plan (QNMP) is described as a "spatial representation of the Qatar National Vision 2030". As part of the QNMP's Urban Centre plan, which aims to implement development strategies in 28 central hubs that will serve their surrounding communities, Al Sadd has been designated a Town Centre, which is the third-highest designation.

The plan calls for high-density commercial and office space on Al Sadd Street between the street's two metro stations. A central plaza with a focus on pedestrian access will be located on the eastern side of Al Sadd Street, whereas the western side will mainly facilitate offices. Al Sadd's C-Ring Road Corridor will be developed as a mixed-use corridor. Mixed-use developments are planned to take up 69.3% of the Town Centre. Overall, the Town Centre precinct has around 50,000 inhabitants.

== Education ==
The following schools are located in Al Sadd:

Name of School	Curriculum	Grade	Genders	Official Website	Ref
Al Bayan Second Primary Independent Girls	Independent	Kindergarten – Primary	Female-only	N/A	
Al Farida Kindergarten	International	Kindergarten	Both	N/A	
New Generation Kindergarten	Independent	Kindergarten	Both	N/A	

== Demographics ==
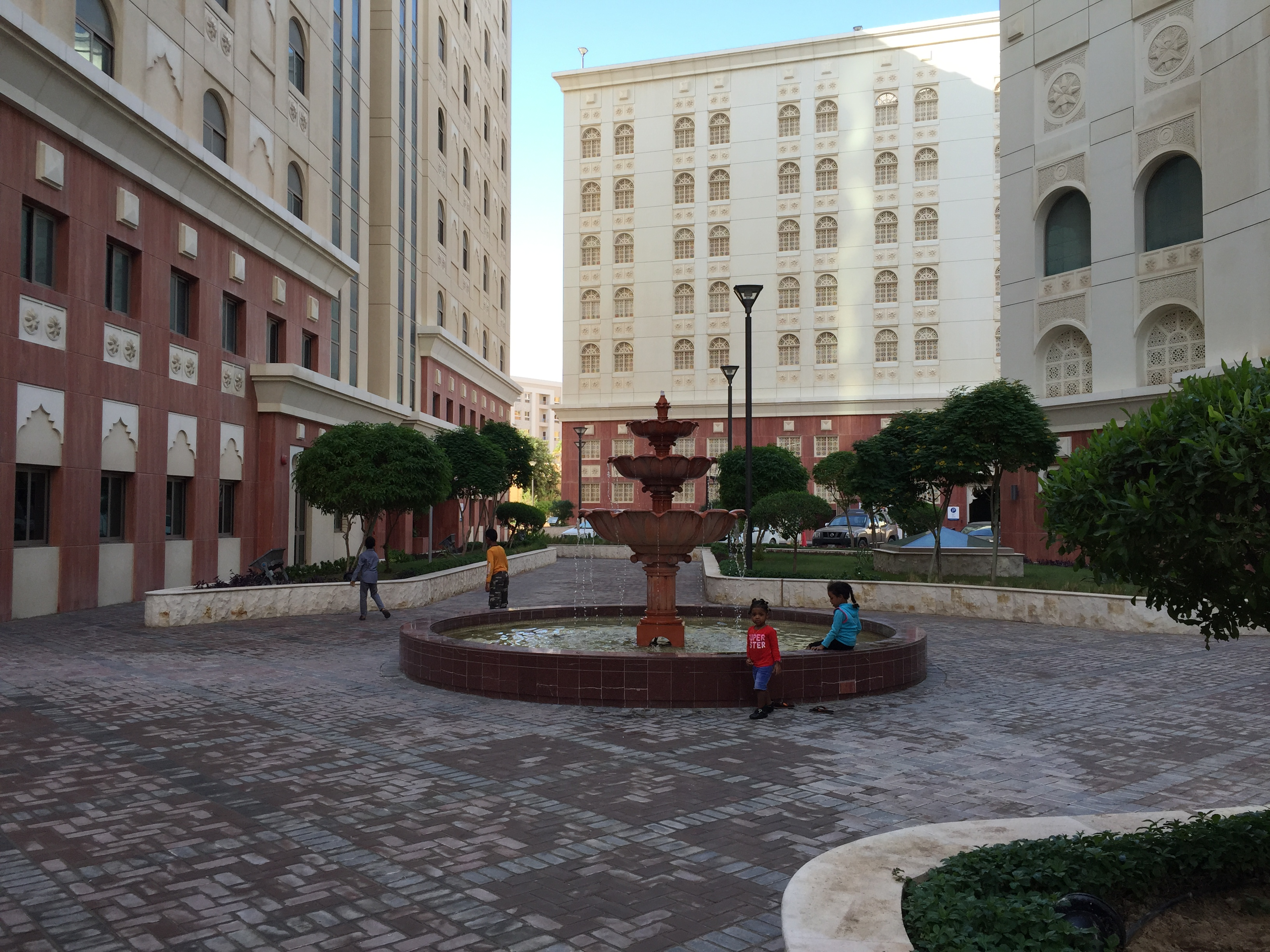
Central square of the Barwa Al Sadd residential development. The community consists of seven high-rises and includes retail and office spaces.

Similar to the rest of Doha, most of Al Sadd's population is composed mainly of migrant workers.

As of the 2010 census, the district comprised 6,089 housing units and 805 establishments. There were 14,113 people living in the district, of which 61% were male and 39% were female. Out of the 14,113 inhabitants, 76% were 20 years of age or older and 24% were under the age of 20. The literacy rate stood at 97.9%.

Employed persons made up 60% of the total population. Females accounted for 25% of the working population, while males accounted for 75% of the working population.

Year	Population
1986	3,962
1997	5,447
2004	5,323
2010	14,113
