= Al Shagub =

Al Shagub الشقب
- District
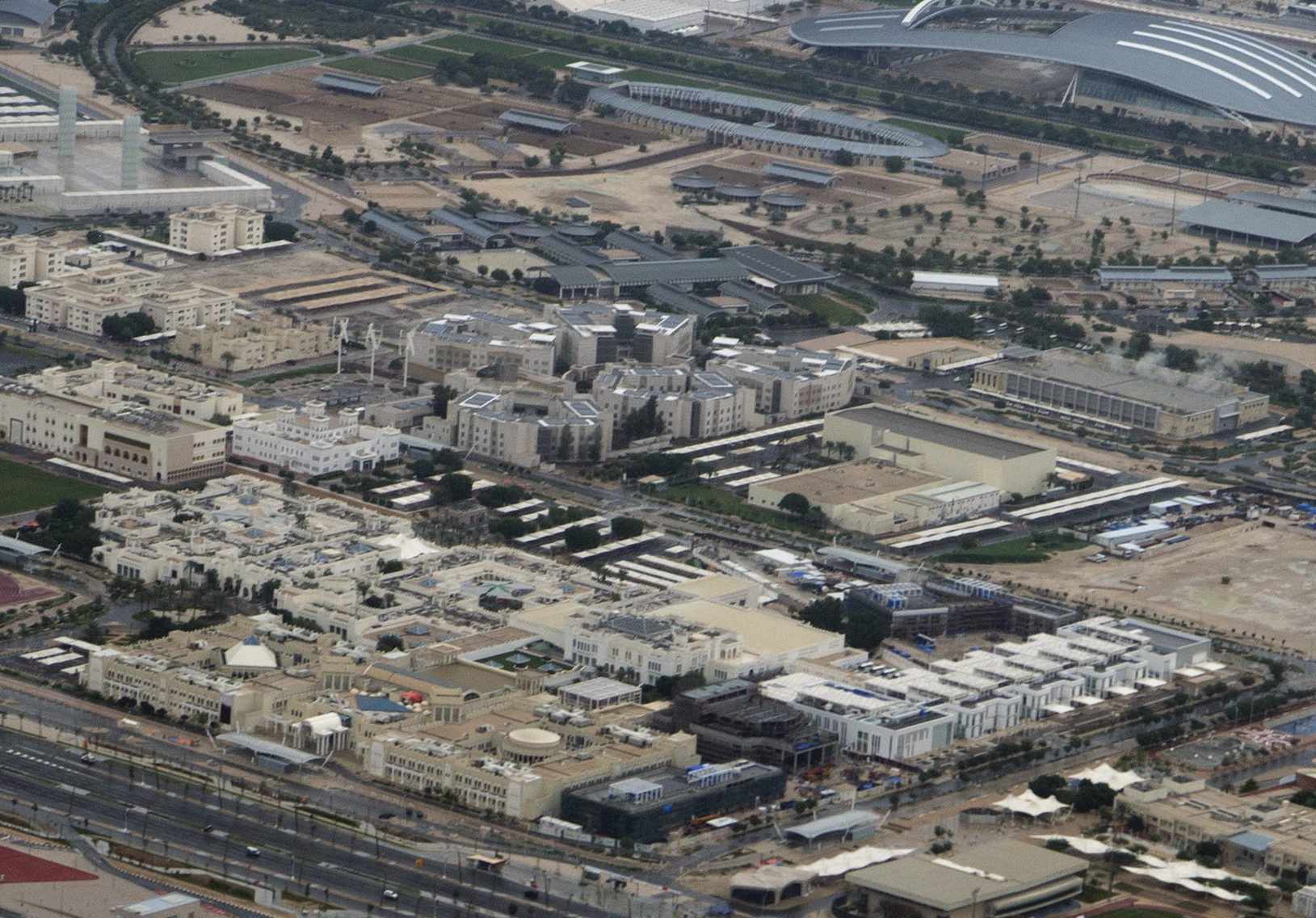
- Aerial view of Al Shagub. The Al Shaqab Equestrian Center can be seen in the top right.

- Location within Qatar
- Coordinates: 25°18′27″N 51°26′29″E
- Country: Qatar
- Municipality: Al Rayyan
- Zone: Zone 52
- District no.: 63

Area
  - Total: 3.0 km^{2} (1.2 sq mi)
- Elevation: 24 m (79 ft)

Al Shagub (Arabic: الشقب, romanized: Ash Shaqb; also spelled Al Shaqab) is a district of Al Rayyan City in Qatar, located in the municipality of Al Rayyan. Since it houses the universities in Qatar Foundation's educational project Education City, the district is sometimes referred to as Education City. Qatar Foundation has played a major role in developing the district.

== History ==
J.G. Lorimer's Gazetteer of the Persian Gulf gives an account of Al Shagub in 1908. He describes it as a "Bedouin camping ground" that is "7 miles west of Dohah and a little north-east of Maraikh". He goes on to write "there is a fort here with a masonry well, 6 fathoms deep, of good water inside; it is on the way from Dohah to Wajbah."

== Infrastructure ==
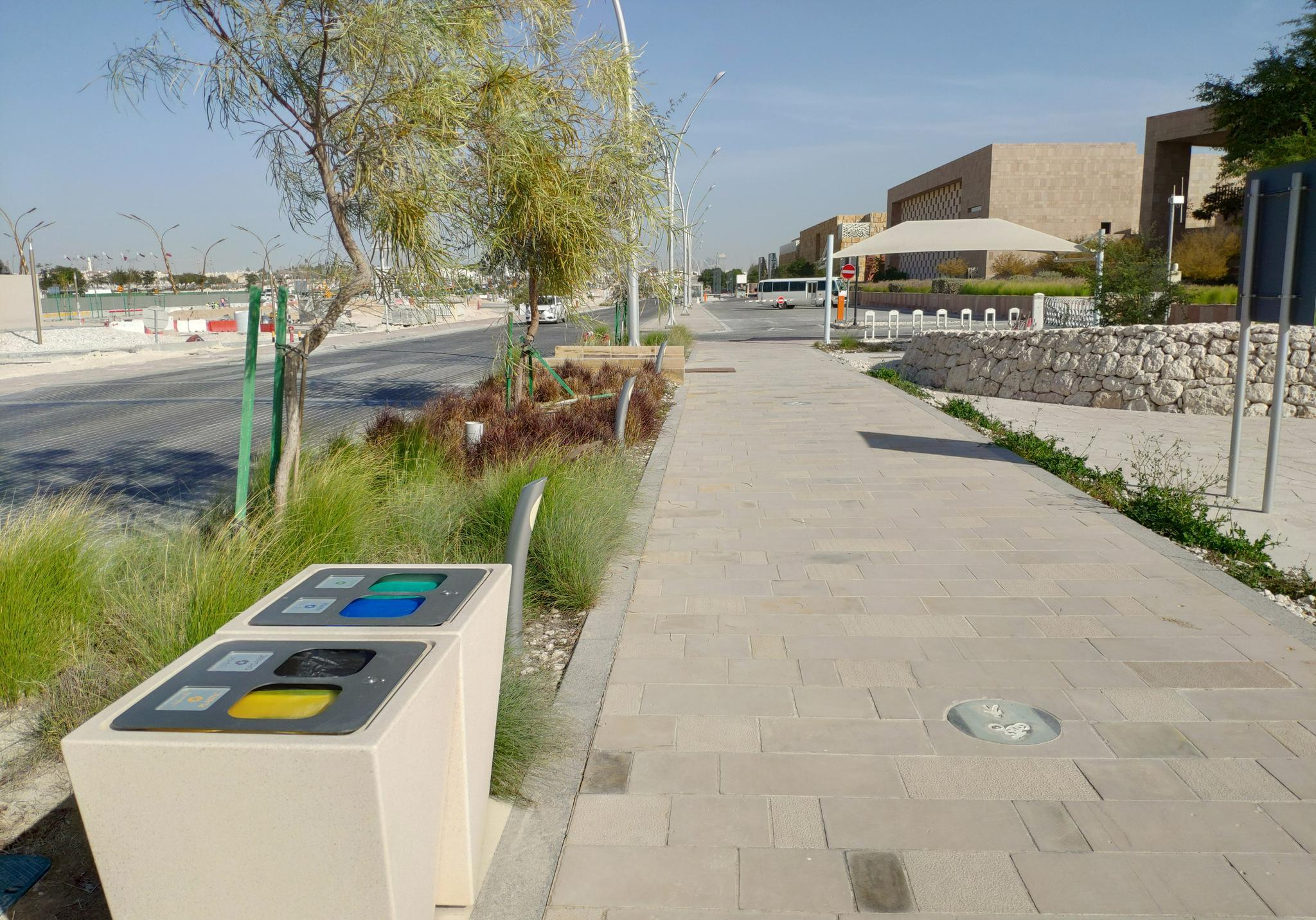
Sidewalk near Georgetown University in Qatar in Al Shagub.

The district houses Education City's university campuses, including Carnegie Mellon University in Qatar, Texas A&M University at Qatar, and Georgetown University in Qatar. The Qatar National Library is also in the district. Other facilities affiliated with Qatar Foundation are situated in Al Shagub and the nearby north-bound districts of Gharrafat Al Rayyan and Al Gharrafa.

The Al Shaqab Equestrian Center is located towards the southern edge of the district. The equestrian center is located near Al Shaqab Fort. To the immediate south of the equestrian center is the Al Rayyan Municipal Office in the district of Old Al Rayyan.

== Historical landmarks ==
Constructed in 1935, Al Shagub Well is one of Qatar's oldest extant wells. It was one of the few wells yielding good water in the area, the other main wells being located to the east in Doha. There is a wall and roof structure shielding the well, in addition to two benches nearby.

Another structure dating to 1935 is the Al Shagab Swimming Pool, which was built as part of a house in an area devoid of people at the time. During this period in Qatar, pools were exceedingly rare. The pool occupies a rectangular space of 8 metres (26 ft) by 6 metres (20 ft). Two other pools are also attached to the residence.

== Transport ==
The underground Al Shaqab station currently serves the Green Line of the Doha Metro. It is located on Huwar Street in Old Al Rayyan, near its border with Al Shagub. The station was opened to the public on 10 December, 2019 along with the other Green Line stations.
