= Green Line (Doha Metro) =

Rapid transit line in Doha, Qatar

Overview
- Other name: Education Line
- Native name: الخط الاخضر
- Status: Operating
- Owner: Government of Qatar
- Locale: Doha, Qatar
- Termini: Al Riffa; Al Mansoura
- Stations: 11

Service
- Type: Rapid transit
- System: Doha Metro
- Operator: Qatar Rail
- Depot: Doha Metro West Depot

History
- Opened: 10 December 2019; 6 years ago

Technical
- Line length: 22 km (14 mi)
- Character: Elevated, Underground
- Track gauge: 1,435 mm (4 ft 8 1/2 in) standard gauge
- Electrification: 750 V DC third rail

The Green Line, also known as the Education Line, is a rapid transit line of the Doha Metro in Qatar's capital city of Doha. Opened to the public on 10 December 2019, it runs east to west, beginning at Al Mansoura and terminating at the Al Riffa station on Dukhan Highway in Rawdat Al Jahhaniya. The line covers a total distance of 22 kilometres (14 mi). Part of the line runs underground, part at grade (ground level) and part of it is elevated on viaducts. Currently, the line has 11 stations, with plans to expand to 31 stations covering 65.3 km in the future.

== Stations ==
Station name		Transfers	Opening date
English	Arabic	Transfers	Opening date
Al Riffa	الرفاع		10 December 2019
Education City	المدينة التعليمية		10 December 2019
Qatar National Library	مكتبة قطر الوطنية		10 December 2019
Al Shaqab	الشقب		10 December 2019
Al Rayyan Al Qadeem	الريان القديم		10 December 2019
Al Messila	المسيلة		10 December 2019
Hamad Hospital	مستشفى حمد		10 December 2019
The White Palace	القصر الأبيض		10 December 2019
Al Bidda	البدع	Red Line (Doha Metro)	10 December 2019
Msheireb	مشيرب	Red Line (Doha Metro) Gold Line (Doha Metro)	10 December 2019
Al Mansoura	المنصورة		10 December 2019
