= Al Riffa station =

Metro station in Al Rayyan, Qatar

Al Riffa Mall of Qatar Metro Station محطة مترو الرفاع

General information
- Location: Dukhan Highway, opposite to the Mall of Qatar, Al Rayyan Municipality; Qatar
- Coordinates: 25.32412°N 51.34806°E
- Owner: Qatar Rail
- Operator: Doha Metro
- Platforms: 2
- Tracks: 1

Construction
- Structure type: Elevated
- Parking: Yes
- Accessible: Yes

Other information
- Website: www.qr.com.qa

History
- Opened: 10 December 2019

Services
Preceding station	Doha Metro	Following station
Terminus	Green Line	Education City towards Al Mansoura
Location

Al Riffa Mall of Qatar station is the western terminus of the Doha Metro's Green Line and serves the municipality of Al Rayyan, which is a part of the Doha Metropolitan Area in Qatar. The station is located on Dukhan Highway, opposite the Mall of Qatar, in the newly developed Rawdat Al Jahhaniya district. The naming rights to the station are currently held by Mall of Qatar.

The station currently has only 1 metrolink bus. Facilities on the premises include restrooms and a prayer room. Beyond this station, the metro line goes underground.

== History ==
The station was opened to the public on 10 December 2019 along with the other Green Line stations.

== Connections ==
The station is served by bus routes M212, leading to Al Reem Compund & Barzan Housing Complex
