= Al Mansoura station =

Metro station in Doha, Qatar

Al Mansoura metro station

General information
- Location: Intersection of Al Mansoura Street–Al Mansoura Street, Doha; Qatar
- Coordinates: 25.27033°N 51.53528°E
- Owner: Qatar Rail
- Operator: Doha Metro
- Platforms: 2
- Tracks: 2

Construction
- Structure type: Underground
- Parking: Yes
- Accessible: Yes

Other information
- Website: http://www.qr.com.qa/

History
- Opened: 10 December 2019

Services
Preceding station	Doha Metro	Following station
Msheireb towards Al Riffa	Green Line	Terminus
Location

Al Mansoura station is the current eastern terminus station on the Doha Metro's Green Line. It serves the Al Mansoura and Najma districts. It is located on Al Mansoura Street in the Fereej Bin Durham District, to the immediate north of Al Mansoura's northern boundary line.

Al Mansoura Station is served by Metro Link 115. Facilities on the premises include restrooms and a prayer room.

== History ==
The station was opened to the public on 10 December 2019, along with the other Green Line stations.

== Connections ==
It is served by bus routes 10, 12 and 757. Metro Link 115 is available from Al Mansoura Station.
