= Doha Metro =

Rapid transit system in Doha, Qatar

Overview
- Owner: Qatar Rail
- Area served: Al Wakra, Doha, Lusail, Al Qassar, Education City
- Locale: Doha Metropolitan Area
- Transit type: Rapid transit
- Number of lines: 3
- Number of stations: 37
- Headquarters: Doha
- Website: Qatar Rail

Operation
- Began operation: 8 May 2019; 7 years ago
- Operator: RKH Qitarat (Hamad/Keolis-RATP Dev)
- Train length: 3
- Headway: 2–5 minutes

Technical
- System length: 76 km (47 mi) (operational); 48.1 km (29.9 mi) (planned)
- Track gauge: 1,435 mm (4 ft 8 1/2 in) standard gauge
- Electrification: 750 V DC third rail
- Top speed: 107 km/h (66 mph)

Logo in 2018

The Doha Metro (Arabic: مترو الدوحة, romanized: Mitru ad-Dawha) is a rapid transit system in the Doha Metropolitan Area, including Qatar's capital city Doha, which became operational on 8 May 2019. It has three lines with an approximate overall length of 76 km (47 mi) and 37 stations. It is an integral component of the wider Qatar Rail network, which will include a long-distance rail for passengers and freight, linking Qatar to the GCC, and the Lusail Tram. Capable of reaching 100 km/h (62 mph), the Doha Metro has one of the fastest driverless trains in the world.

Doha Metro is operated and maintained for a duration of 20 years by RKH Qitarat, a joint venture formed by Hamad Group (51%) and French transit operators Keolis and RATP Dev (49%), on behalf of system owner Qatar Rail.

== History ==
In 2009, Qatari Diar and Deutsche Bahn signed a joint venture to develop a concept for a railway network in Qatar. In 2011, Qatar Rail became the sole owner of the project while Deutsche Bahn with its global wing DB International (since 2016, DB Engineering & Consulting) took over as main consultant and source for required railway experts. In 2013, the construction of the Doha Metro officially began with a groundbreaking ceremony at the site of Msheireb station. Throughout early 2013, Qatar Rail released the D&B tenders and received submissions from various international firms to construct sections of Phase 1a, corresponding to the Red and Green Lines. In mid-May Salini Impregilo was awarded to manage the construction of the Red Line North segment, running from Msheireb to Al Khor North. In June, it was revealed that QDVC and Porr were successful in their bids to lead the building of the Red Line South segment and Green Line, respectively. In May 2014 a consortium of Larsen & Toubro, Aktor, Yapi Merkezi, STFA Group and Al Jaber Engineering was awarded to design and construct the Doha Metro Gold Line. A total of 21 tunnel-boring machines from the German company Herrenknecht were planned for the tunnel construction of the Metro Phase 1.

== Lines ==
The Doha Metro consists of three lines opening in phases from 2019 to 2020, with an eventual completion date of 2026. The Red, Green and Gold Lines radiate out from a central interchange at Msheireb in downtown Doha.

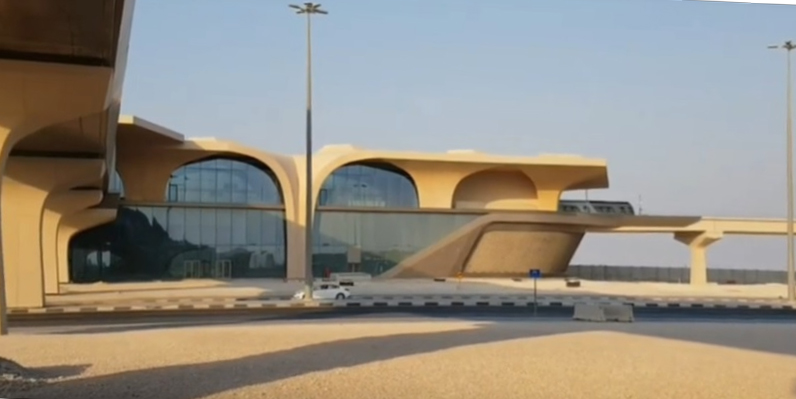
A view of the completed Al Wakrah metro station, part of the Red Line, in June 2019

Line	Inaugural date	Length km	Stations	Termini	Status
Red Line	8 May 2019 (Al Qassar to Al Wakra) 10 December 2019 (Hamad International Airport, Katara, Qatar University and Lusail)	40	18	Lusail; Hamad International Airport; Al Wakra	Operating
Green Line	10 December 2019	22	11	Al Riffa; Al Mansoura	Operating
Gold Line	21 November 2019	14	11	Al Aziziya; Ras Abu Aboud	Operating
Blue Line		17.5	14	Funduq Park; Hamad Intl Airport T2	Planned
Total		93	54		

=== Segments ===
Doha Metro Phase 1 was implemented by multiple joint ventures involving local and international contractors. Qatar Rail has previously specified that consortiums looking to build different parts of the network should partner with a Qatari firm, which has led to companies such as Qatar Building Company, Galfar al-Misnad Engineering, Al Darwish and HBK Contracting all picking up work alongside international bidders.

- Red Line North (Underground): The Red Line North starts from Msheireb station in the South to Al Khor in the North. Seven underground stations are proposed along this route up to Doha Golf Club, from where it will be at grade to reach Al Khor. A Joint Venture (JV) led by Salini Impregilo, South Korea's SK Engineering & Construction, and Galfar al-Misnad was chosen as the design-and-build (D&B) contractor.
- Red Line North (Elevated & at-grade): A Joint Venture (JV) consortium comprising Korea's Lotte Engineering & Construction, Rizzani de Eccher of Italy and Redco of Qatar has been chosen as the D&B contractor.
- Red Line South (Underground): The Red Line South extends from Msheireb in the North to Mesaieed in the South. It is planned to have six underground stations. The D&B JV contractors are Qatari Diar Vinci Construction (QDVC), GS Engineering & Construction, and Al Darwish Engineering.
- Red Line South (Elevated & at-grade): The Joint Venture led by Spain's FCC and comprising Turkey's Yuksel, Netherlands’ Archirodon and Qatar's Petroserv has been selected as the D&B contractor for the line. The scope of work involves full design and construction of the Red Line section along Al Wakra Highway. This is 5.8 km (3.6 mi) of elevated viaduct, 0.4 km (0.25 mi) of at-grade track, an "underpass structure" of about 1 km (0.62 mi) length and "grading" of the depot area measuring 250 acres. The value of the contract, awarded in March 2014, was $654 million and the project was to be completed in 31 months.
- Green Line (Underground, Elevated and At-grade): The Green Line, which also has all types of sections (underground, elevated and at-grade), extends from Msheireb in the East to Al Riffa in Doha West. The project's D&B contract for the Green line underground project has been given to a JV led by PORR Bau (UG-Lead partner), QD-Saudi Bin Laden Group (Elevated-Lead Partner) and Hamad Bin Khalid Contracting.
- Gold Line: The Gold Line connects nine underground stations. The D&B contractor is ALYSJ JV led by Greece's Ellaktor and comprising Larsen and Toubro (India), Yapı Merkezi (Turkey), STFA Group (Turkey) and Al Jaber Engineering (Qatar). The consortium won the contract with a bid of $4.4 billion in January 2015.

=== Stations ===
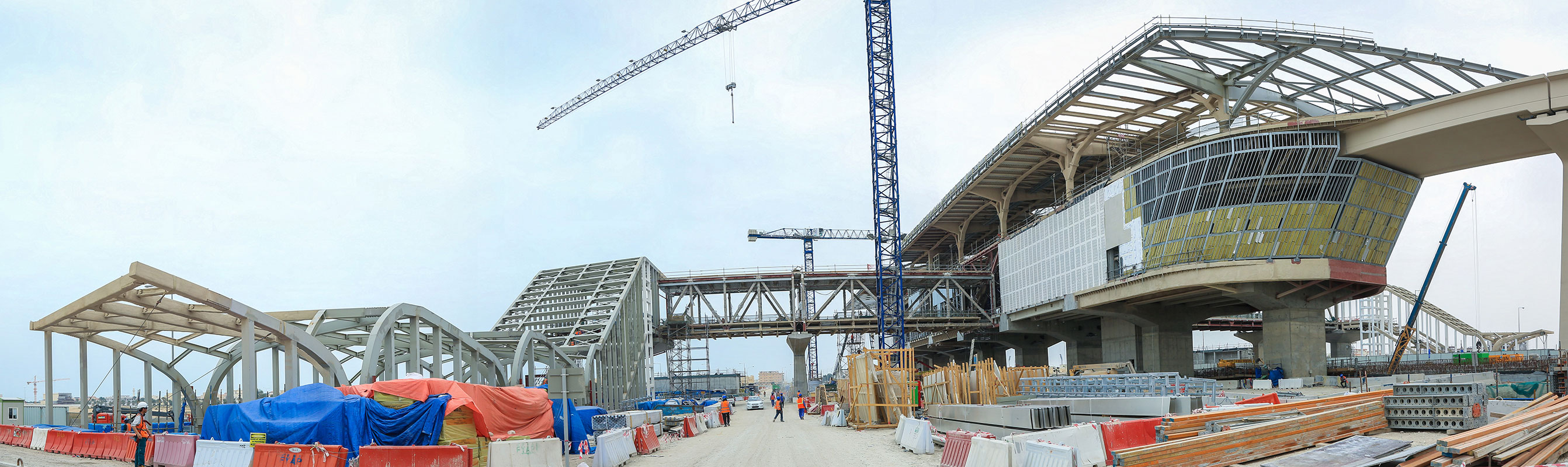
Construction of the Red Line in February 2018

Doha Metro will have about 100 stations when the project is completed. This will include a major interchanges station built at Msheireb, hub for the Metro network and the interchange for Red, Green and Gold Lines. Qatar Rail chose to integrate Qatari culture into the Metro by naming stations after historical towns and cities, each with its own story and background.

==== Phase 1 ====
Red Line (Coastal Line)

A North-South Line connecting the towns of Lusail, West Bay, Msheireb, Hamad International Airport and Al Wakra.

- Lusail QNB
- Qatar University
- Leqtaifiya
- Katara Cultural Village
- Al Qassar
- DECC
- West Bay Qatar Energy
- Corniche
- Al Bidda
- Msheireb
- Al Doha Al Jadeda
- Umm Ghuwailina
- Al Matar Al Qadeem
- Oqba Ibn Nafie
- Hamad International Airport Terminal 1
- Free Zone
- Ras Bu Fontas
- Al Wakra

Green Line (Education Line)

The Green Line follows Al Rayyan Road connecting Education City with the Heart of Doha. Furthermore, it links to Umm Salal and the Industrial Area South.

- Al Riffa Mall of Qatar
- Education City
- Qatar National Library
- Al Shaqab
- Al Rayyan Al Qadeem
- Al Messila
- Hamad Hospital
- The White Palace
- Al Bidda
- Msheireb
- Al Mansoura

Gold Line (Historic Line)

The Gold Line runs in an East-West direction and connects Airport City North via central Msheireb with Al Waab Street, Al Rayyan South and Salwa Road.

- Ras Bu Abboud (was Airport City North)
- National Museum of Qatar
- Souq Waqif
- Msheireb
- Bin Mahmoud
- Al Sadd
- Joaan
- Sudan
- Al Waab QLM
- Sports City
- Al Aziziya

Most stations will offer free feeder buses to places near the stations. Standard tickets cost 2 QAR each for one way, whilst 'gold club' tickets cost 10 QAR each.

==== Phase 2 ====
This will be updated when Qatar Rail has announced the stations for the next phase. This phase contains Blue Line.

== Design ==
The Doha Metro stations design was selected in October 2013 by the Emir of Qatar. The design is called "Vaulted Spaces"; it is derived from historic Islamic architecture, using old Islamic architectural elements in a modern way. UNStudio, the company responsible for the metro stations design, highlighted the region's vernacular architecture; the design acts as a bridge between the country's past and future. One of the key elements of the design is the exterior shape of the station; this uses bright, modern materials to simulate the interior of an oyster. The levels of the stations will be open to each other giving passengers at feeling of comfort, and concealing the lighting and ventilation in the shapes of the arches. The "Vaulted Spaces" design was selected out of a total of six proposals and master plans for the Doha Metro stations.

The specific trains used were designed by the Kinki Sharyo Industrial Design Office in collaboration with the German Design firm Tricon Design, to reflect the culture of Qatar. The Emir is known to have personally selected the exterior design of the trains, inspired by the shape of an Arabian horse.

In May 2016, Consolidated Contractors (CCC) took over the contract for the Msheireb and Education City stations, from a joint venture of Samsung C&T Corporation (S. Korea), Obrascon Huarte Lein (Spain), and Qatar Building Company.

== Technology ==
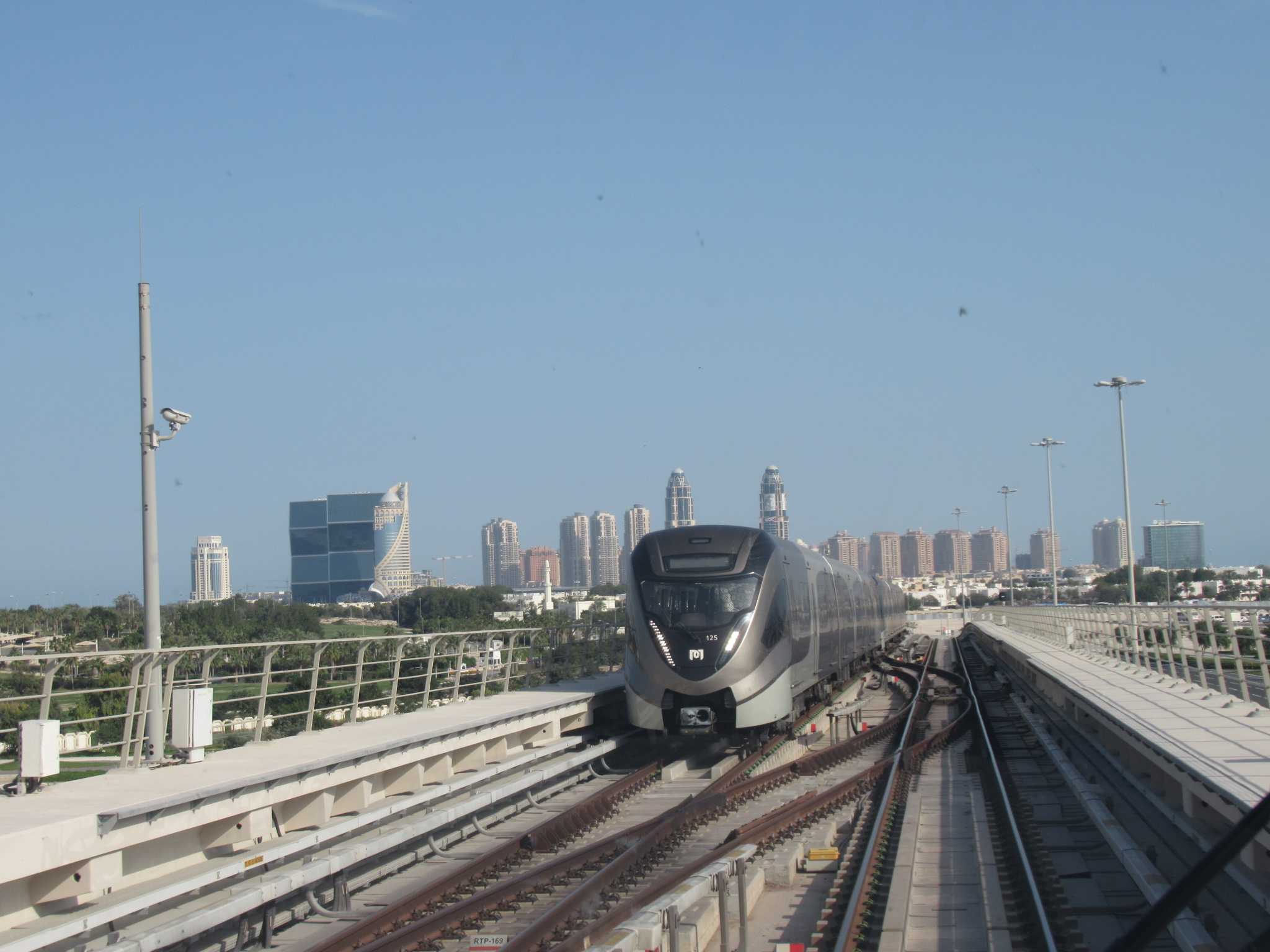
A Doha Metro train on the Red Line

=== Rolling stock ===
The 75 three-car driverless trainsets for the metro system are supplied jointly by Japanese companies Mitsubishi Corporation and Kinki Sharyo. The first four sets were delivered in August 2017.

=== Signaling, telecommunication and security system ===
Thales of France will supply the train control signalling, telecommunication, a security system, an operations control center and an automatic fare collection system.

=== Track and power supply ===
Mitsubishi Heavy Industries will supply the track and power supply. The company will also supply the platform screen doors and tunnel ventilation and will be responsible with overall project management and system integration.

=== Bored tunnels ===
Video from a Red Line metro train

The Metro network will cover the Greater Doha area and will include connections to town centers and main commercial and residential areas throughout the city. In central Doha, the Metro will be underground, whilst on the outskirts it will mainly be at ground level or elevated. For the underground works, Qatar Railways Company (Qatar Rail) imported tunnel boring machines (TBMs). 21 TBMs were used to cut tunnels 20 meters beneath the city for the lines.

Each of the TBMs for the Doha Metro measures 7.05m in diameter and 120m in length. To ensure successful transportation, the machines are dismantled into sections, including the cutter head.

Each TBM traveled a distance of between 7–9 km and took approx. 2 years to complete their respective tunnels. The TBM average speed will be between 12m/day to 21m/day, depending on ground conditions. Daily excavation quantity will be over 600m³, with an estimated predicted total excavation quantity of over 5,000,000m³.

Qatar Rail has been recognised by Guinness World Records for having "The Largest Number of Tunnel Boring Machines Operating Simultaneously in a Single Project", a milestone for large-scale transport projects in Qatar and across the region. With this recognition, the company has broken the previous world record, which was 19 simultaneously operational TBMs.

In 2017, Qatar Rail received the ITA Award from the International Tunneling and Underground Space Association for the Major Project of the year 2017. The Doha Metro project was nominated under the category of "Projects exceeding 500 Million Euros" and won the award after being shortlisted with other three megaprojects from Canada, Iran and India.

=== IT infrastructure ===
Computers, network infrastructure and other related equipment were provided by IBM, Lenovo, Hewlett-Packard, Siemens and Cisco Systems.

== Safety and security ==
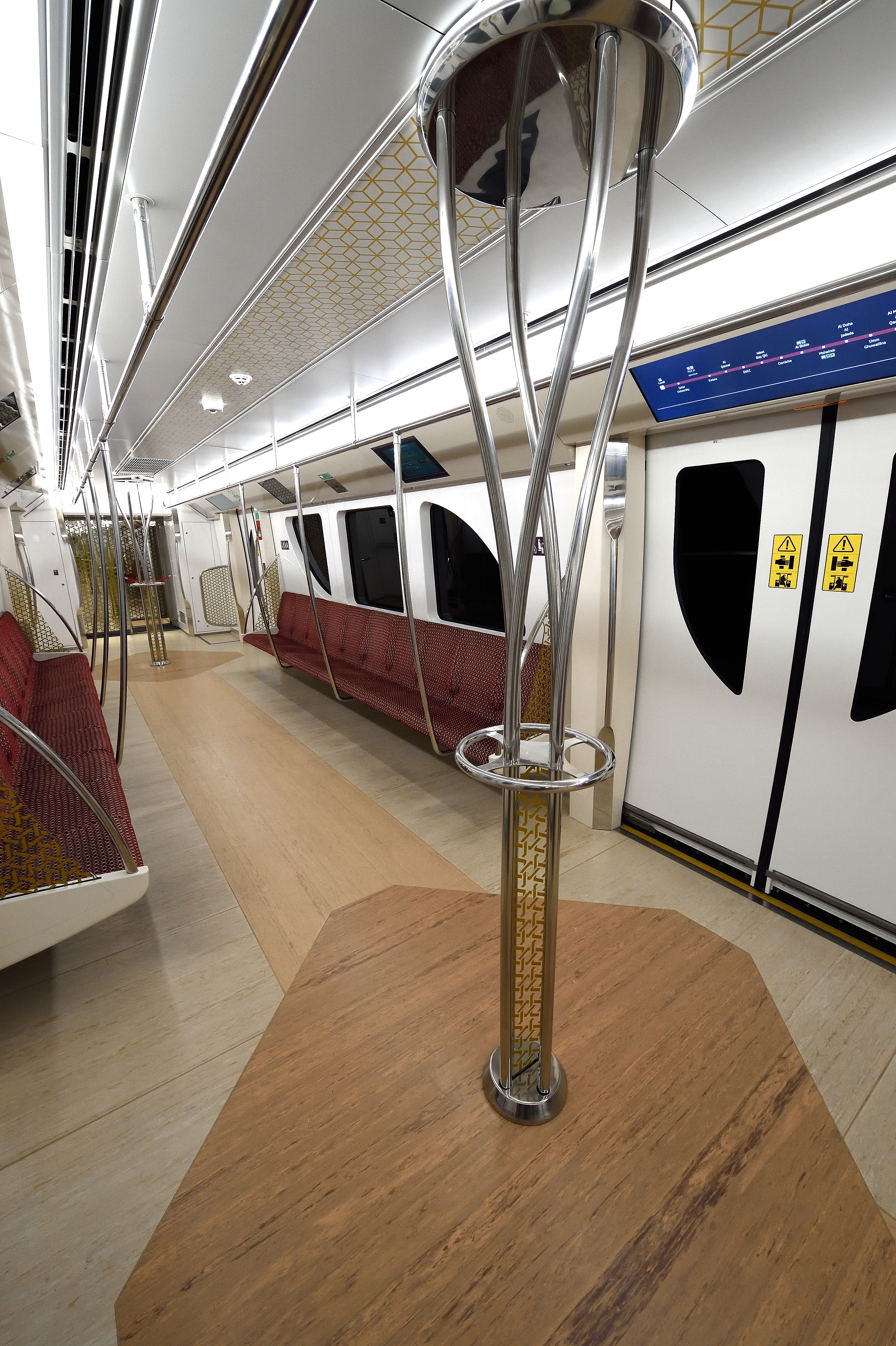
Interior of a Doha Metro train

Safety and security measures are applied throughout the drilling phase of the underground Doha Metro works. The planned procedures involve elements that can guarantee a safe working environment, far from the risks of injuries, including managing emergency cases and treating them swiftly. The safety & security program of Qatar's Railway focuses on the emergency planning and response on the railway network while taking into consideration the unique nature of mass transit systems when planning for and implementing the program. The transport policies, security models addressing the legal and regulatory issues, as well as the relationships between the involved institutions are also part of the safety and security plan that Qatar Rail Company is leading in Doha.

In September 2014, Qatar Rail, the owner and manager of Qatar's rail network and the party responsible for the design, construction, commissioning, operation and maintenance of the entire rail network and system, has held a strategic workshop on the safety, security, and resilience of the country's railway network in consultation with UK and Qatari experts. The company proposed its safety and security programme, along with its recommendations and a full roadmap towards the future operation stage of the railway.

In June 2014, it was announced that the Doha Metro Green Line Project achieved 6 million work hours without a lost time injury (LTI).

== Operation ==
The Metro System will be operated as a system with automatic train operation as Grade of Operation level 4 (GoA4). GoA4 is unattended train operation (UTO) where starting and stopping, operation of doors and handling of emergencies are fully automated without any on-train staff.

The network has two classes of travel, standard and goldclub. Standard tickets cost 10 Qatari riyals for the card and 2 riyals per journey, while goldclub tickets cost 100 riyals for the card and 10 per journey. These cards are refillable in their app or in any of the stations. There are three types of train car used on the metro network: standard, goldclub, and family cars, which allow families and single women but not men. During the 2022 FIFA World Cup, all cars were designated as standard to increase capacity on the network.
