= Qatar Rail =

State-owned Qatari railway company

- Founded: 2011
- Headquarters: Doha, Qatar
- Key people: Sheikh Mohammed bin Abdulrahman Al Thani (Chairperson); Abudlla bin Abdulaziz Al Subaie (CEO)
- Services: Railways
- Website: corp.qr.com.qa

Qatar Railways Company, commonly known as Qatar Rail, is a state-owned railway company, responsible for rail transport in Qatar. It is owned and operated by the Government of Qatar. Established in 2011, the company is responsible for the design, construction, commissioning, operation and maintenance of the entire rail network and systems. On May 8, 2019, Qatar rail started the preview service of Doha Metro with 13 stations on the Red Line, starting from Al-Qassar station in the north to Al-Wakra station in the south. The three metro lines that form the current network became fully operational by September 2020.

== Projects ==
Individual rail projects comprise the Doha Metro, a mostly underground rail network which connects communities within Doha and its suburbs, the Lusail Light Rail Transit (LLRT), a tram network in the city of Lusail, and the Long Distance Passenger and Freight Rail connecting cities in the north and west with Doha, and the country with the forthcoming GCC rail system.

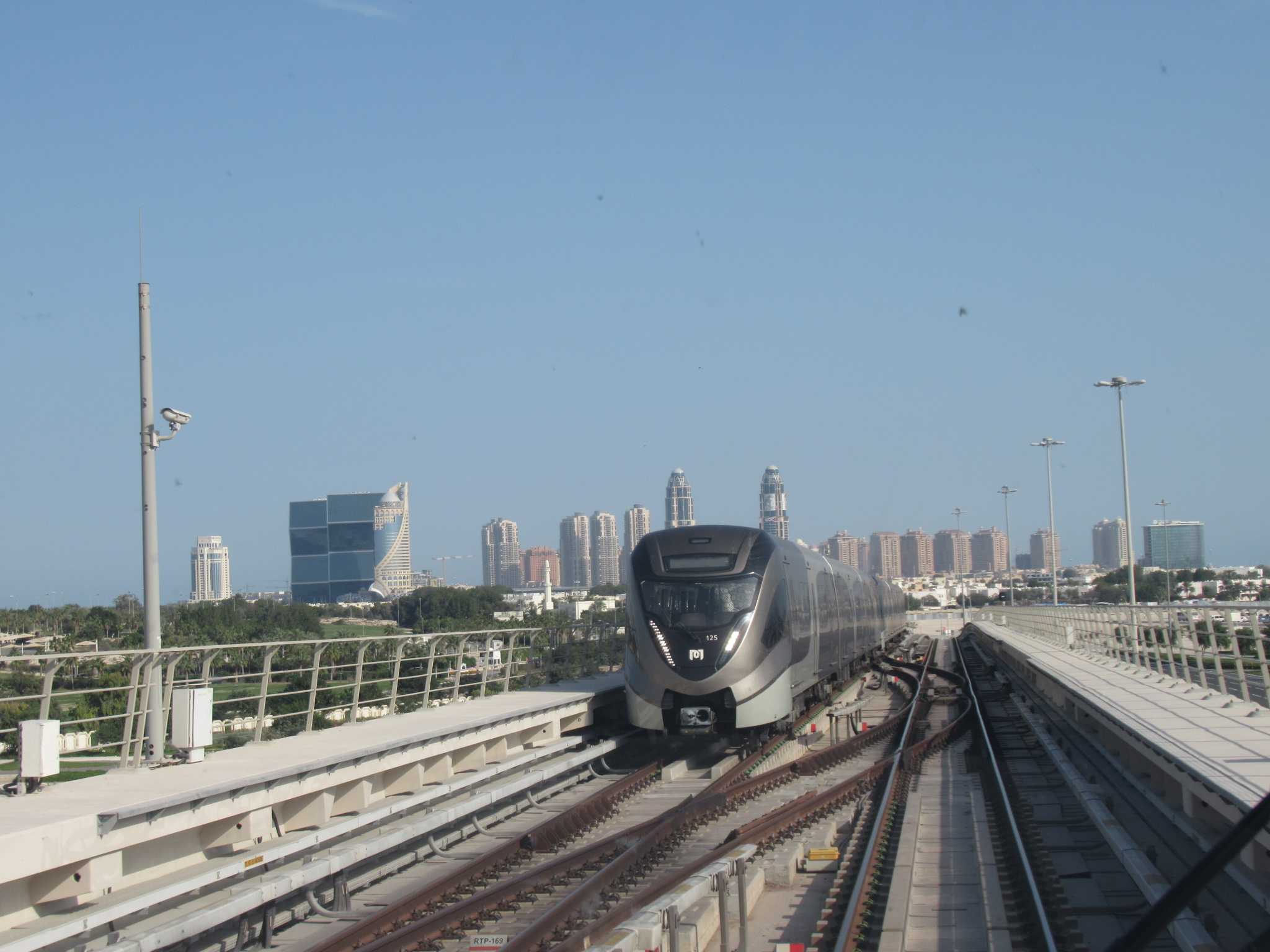
A Doha Metro train on the Red Line

Doha Metro: The Doha Metro has three lines with an approximate overall length of 300 km (190 mi) and 37 stations. It has been built over two phases: the first phase with the Red, Gold, and Green lines opened in 2019, with 37 stations. The second phase will involve the introduction of an additional Blue Line and the expansion of the existing ones, with more than 60 additional stations.

Lusail Tram: Lusail is an upcoming waterfront development that will house up to 200,000 residents in the future. The Lusail Light Rail Transit (LLRT) network, a tram-based system, will connect all the major points in the city. The network will consist of four main tram lines (Red, Green, Purple, Yellow), and 37 passenger train stations including 10 underground.

Qatar Rail Long Distance: Qatar Rail’s Long Distance Passenger and Freight Rail project envisages development of a long distance passenger and freight rail network to connect major population centres and Qatari industries and to form part of the planned Gulf Cooperation Council (GCC) railway network linking the six countries of the region (Qatar, Saudi Arabia, the United Arab Emirates, Kuwait, Bahrain, and Oman). The network will be executed over four phases. There will be five main lines: 1 freight line, 3 mixed passenger and freight lines and 1 high-speed passenger line. Phase 1 includes construction of nearly 143 km (89 mi) of railway track with a station, three freight yards, an intermodal yard, 59 bridges and 36 culverts.

== Contribution to Qatar National Vision 2030 ==
Qatar Rail intends to develop state-of-the-art railway infrastructure as a part of Qatar National Vision 2030.

On the economic front, Qatar Rail intends to encourage the private sector to participate in rail projects in Qatar. The share of contracts awarded to the private sector within the scope of the Doha Metro and Lusail Tram projects reached 70%, versus the 30% awarded to international companies.

These include the works for designing routes, tunneling for the stations, supplying building materials, and others. In addition, the private sector’s share of participation in the joint ventures of designing and building the Doha Metro and Lusail Tram projects is 15%. Similarly, 61% of the contracts are awarded to local manufacturers of raw materials and transportation equipment to provide what is needed to complete these developments in terms of cement, sand, and iron.

Other initiatives that support the private sector, which are estimated at 222 million QAR, include insurance and technological innovation contracts – 80% of which are awarded to the private sector.

== See also ==
- Transport in Qatar
