= List of communities in Doha =

The list of communities in Doha refers to the designated districts in the Municipality of Doha, Qatar. There are more than 60 communities in Doha.

Community	Area(km^{2})	Population (2010)	Population density(/km^{2})
Al Bidda	0.8 km^{2}	1,067	1,398.0/km^{2}
Al Dafna	1.1 km^{2}	19	17.7/km^{2}
Ad Dawhah al Jadidah	0.5 km^{2}	13,059	27,358.5/km^{2}
Al Egla			
Al Hilal	1.8 km^{2}	11,257	6,393.4/km^{2}
Al Jasrah	0.4 km^{2}	240	672.7/km^{2}
Al Kharayej			
Al Khulaifat			
Al Mansoura			
Al Markhiya	2.7 km^{2}	5,197	1,894.2/km^{2}
Al Messila	2.1 km^{2}	4,716	2,253.9/km^{2}
Al Mirqab			
Al Najada			
Al Qassar			
Al Rufaa			
Al Sadd	3.5 km^{2}	14,113	4,015.1/km^{2}
Al Souq	0.3 km^{2}	679	2,422.1/km^{2}
Al Tarfa			
Al Thumama	7.0 km^{2}	16,596	2370.8/km^{2}
Barahat Al Jufairi			
Dahl Al Hamam			
Doha International Airport	11.3 km^{2}	1,354	120.1/km^{2}
Doha Port	1.5 km^{2}	6	4.0/km^{2}
Duhail	6.8 km^{2}	7,059	1,031.1/km^{2}
Fereej Abdul Aziz	0.5 km^{2}	10,808	20,309.5/km^{2}
Fereej Al Nasr			
Fereej Bin Durham			
Fereej Bin Mahmoud	1.8 km^{2}	24,172	13,428.8/km^{2}
Fereej Bin Omran			
Fereej Kulaib			
Fereej Mohammed Bin Jasim			
Hamad Medical City			
Hazm Al Markhiya	4.2 km^{2}	8,856	2,030.6/km^{2}
Industrial Area	32.1 km^{2}	261,401	8,144.0/km^{2}
Jabal Thuaileb			
Jelaiah			
Jeryan Nejaima			
Lejbailat	1.4 km^{2}	4,024	2,850.3/km^{2}
Lekhwair	0.7 km^{2}	3	4.6/km^{2}
Leqtaifiya			
Madinat Khalifa North	2.4 km^{2}	8,246	3,400/km^{2}
Madinat Khalifa South	2.6 km^{2}	19,821	7,600/km^{2}
Musheireb	0.3 km^{2}	14,063	43,094.0/km^{2}
Najma	1.1 km^{2}	24,763	21,804.4/km^{2}
New Al Hitmi			
New Al Mirqab			
New Salata	3.5 km^{2}	15,114	4,353.5/km^{2}
Nuaija	1.2 km^{2}	5,604	4,536.2/km^{2}
Old Airport	4.7 km^{2}	44,275	9,413.5/km^{2}
Old Al Ghanim	0.4 km^{2}	14,230	34,552.8/km^{2}
Old Al Hitmi			
Onaiza	4.1 km^{2}	12,880	3,141.4/km^{2}
Ras Abu Aboud			
Rawdat Al Khail	1.7 km^{2}	17,219	10,343.6/km^{2}
Rumeilah	1.7 km^{2}	1,595	938.2/km^{2}
Salata			
Umm Ghuwailina	1.4 km^{2}	26,069	18,458.8/km^{2}
Umm Lekhba	3.1 km^{2}	9,871	3,145.8/km^{2}
Wadi Al Banat			
Wadi Al Sail	2.2 km^{2}	547	248.6/km^{2}
