= Wadi Al Sail =

Wadi Al Sail وادي السيل
- District
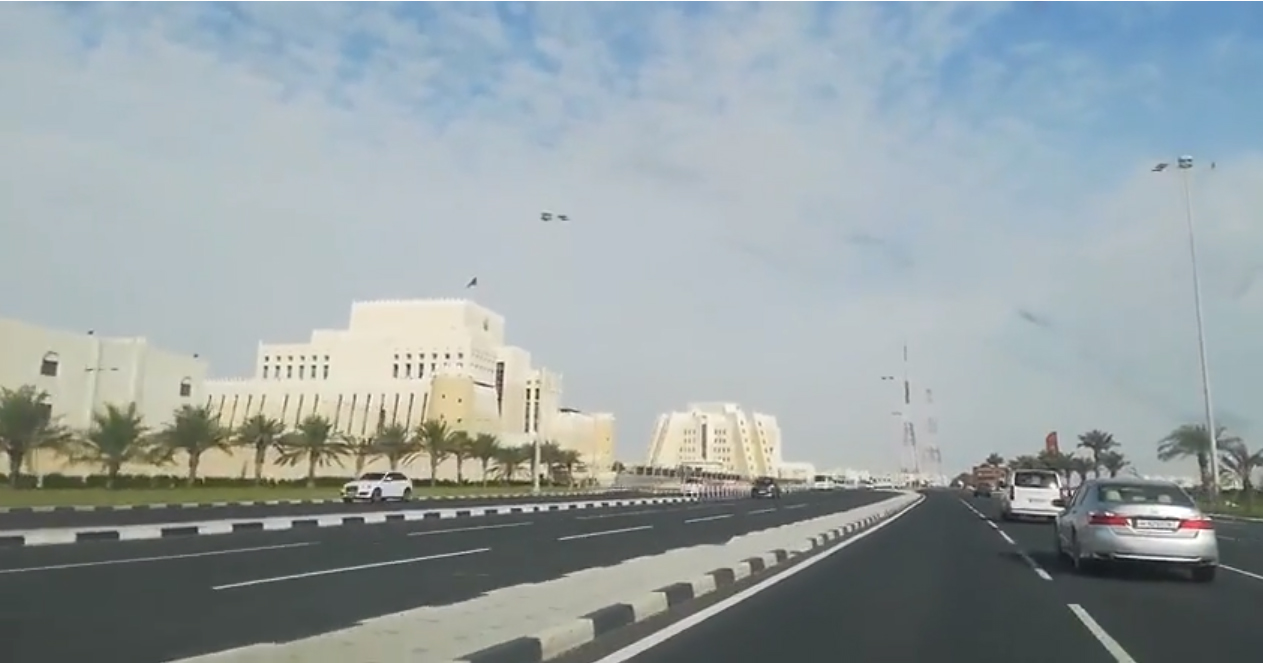
- Ministry of Interior in Wadi Al Sail.

- Location in Qatar Wadi Al Sail (Qatar)
- Coordinates: 25°18′N 51°30′E
- Country: Qatar
- Municipality: Doha
- Zone: Zone 12, Zone 20
- District no.: 10

Area
  - Total: 2.2 km^{2} (0.85 sq mi)

Population
  - Total: 547
  - Density: 250/km^{2} (640/sq mi)

Wadi Al Sail (Arabic: وادي السيل, romanized: Wādī as Sayl) is a neighborhood of Doha, Qatar. The area has undergone much renovation and development in recent years. As its name suggests, the original settlement was built in a wadi. The western partition of the district is known for containing the Qatar Radio and Television Corporation Complex which hosts Al Jazeera's headquarters.

== History ==
In the 1980s Wadi Al Sail had the least expensive land on average in all of Doha. The land price per ft² in 1981 was $39, and decreased to $11 in 1988, making it the joint-cheapest land on par with Najma.

== Landmarks ==
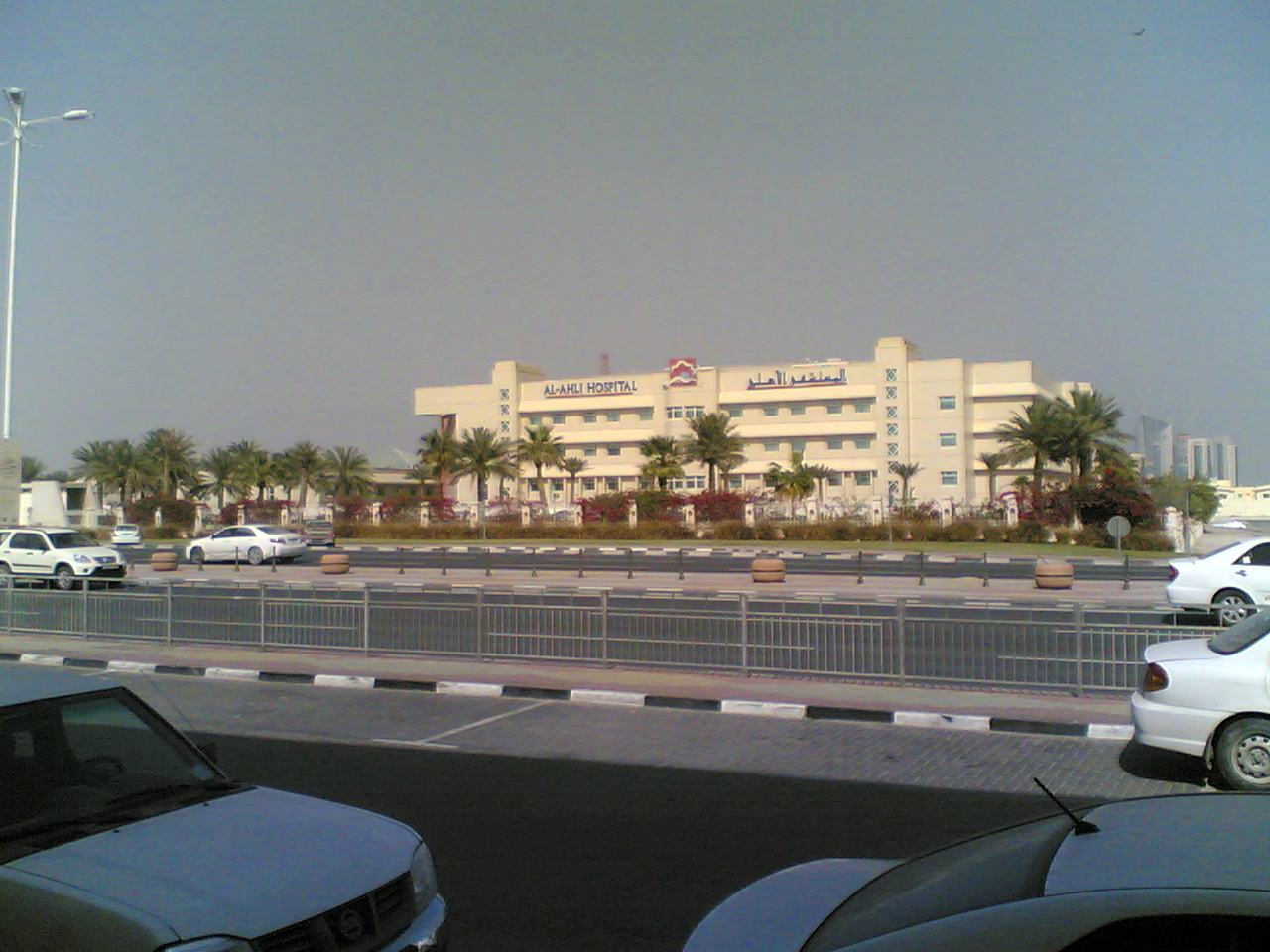
Al Ahli Hospital in Wadi Al Sail.

- Al Ahli Hospital on Ahmed bin Ali Street.
- Qatar Media Corporation on Ahmed bin Ali Street.
- Ministry of Interior on Al Thumama Street.

=== Qatar Radio and Television Corporation Complex ===
Located on Khalifa Street, the Qatar Radio and Television Corporation Complex serves as the headquarters of the Al Jazeera Network, among others. On the premises, there is about 70,000 m^{2} of landscaping, 100 km of asphalt, and paved area of 56,000 m^{2}. Ashghal (The Public Works Authority) launched a QR 138.9 million renovation of the complex in 2010.

=== Wadi Al Sail Civil Defense Center ===
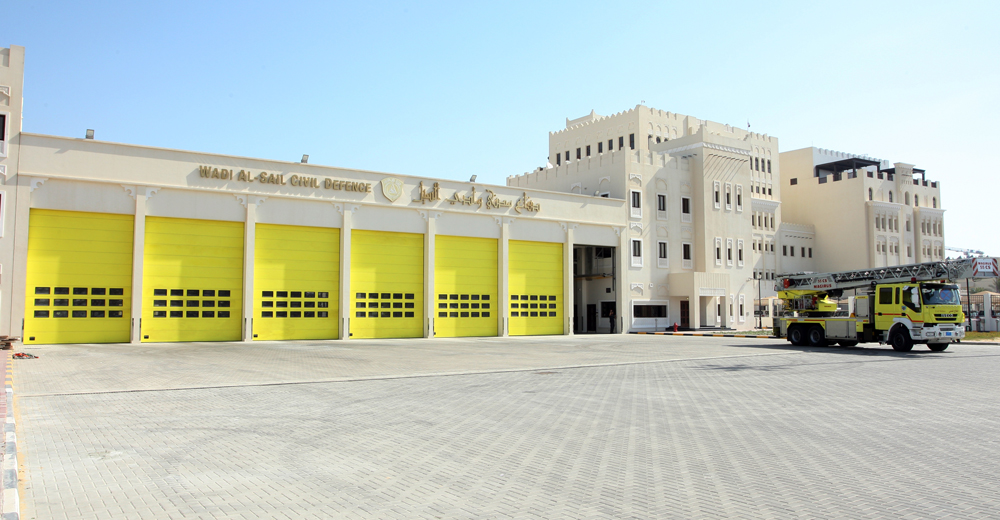
Wadi Al Sail Civil Defense Center.

The Wadi Al Sail Civil Defense Center is located on Ahmed bin Ali Street. The Arab Engineering Bureau was contracted to construct the defense center complex. Completed in 2012, the total developed area is 40,425 m^{2} and the complex's five structures were built in traditional style. Included among its facilities are a fire station, offices, a drill room, a clubhouse and a mosque. The clubhouse accommodates an auditorium, a swimming pool and classrooms.

== Transport ==
Major roads that run through the district are Khalifa Street, which is its northern boundary with Lekhwair; Mohammed Bin Thani Street, which is its southern boundary with Rumeila; Al Bidda Street, which is its eastern boundary with Al Dafna; Onaiza Street, which divides the district's western and eastern half; and Ahmed Bin Ali Street, which is its western boundary with Fereej Bin Omran and Fereej Kulaib.

== Demographics ==
As of the 2010 census, the district comprised 88 housing units and 17 establishments. There were 547 people living in the district, of which 31% were male and 69% were female. Out of the 547 inhabitants, 81% were 20 years of age or older and 19% were under the age of 20. The literacy rate stood at 100%.

Employed persons made up 71% of the total population. Females accounted for 72% of the working population, while males accounted for 28% of the working population.

Year	Population
1986	3,405
1997	3,277
2004	2,645
2010	547
