= West Bay station =

Metro station in Lusail, Qatar

West Bay Qatar Energy metro station محطة مترو لوسيل

General information
- Location: Al Dafna Distrcit, West Bay, Doha, Qatar; Qatar
- Owner: Qatar Rail
- Operator: Doha Metro
- Platforms: 1
- Tracks: 2

Construction
- Structure type: Underground
- Accessible: Yes

Other information
- Website: www.qr.com.qa

History
- Opened: 10 December 2019

Services
Preceding station	Doha Metro	Following station
DECC towards Lusail	Red Line	Corniche towards Al Wakra
Location

West Bay Station is part of the Doha Metro's Red Line and serves the city of Al Dafna. The station is located next to West Bay Bus Depot. The naming rights to the station were once held by QIC, but were later held by Qatar Energy

== History ==
The station was opened to the public on 10 December 2019 along with three other Red Line stations, over six months after the opening of the line's first 13 stations.

== Station facilities ==
Facilities in the station include a prayer room and restrooms.

== Connections ==
There are 2 metrolinks, which is the Doha Metro's free feeder bus network, servicing the station,

- M106, which serves Onaiza (Zone 65).
- M107, which serves Lejbailat
