= Al Khulaifat =

Al Khulaifat الخليفات
- District
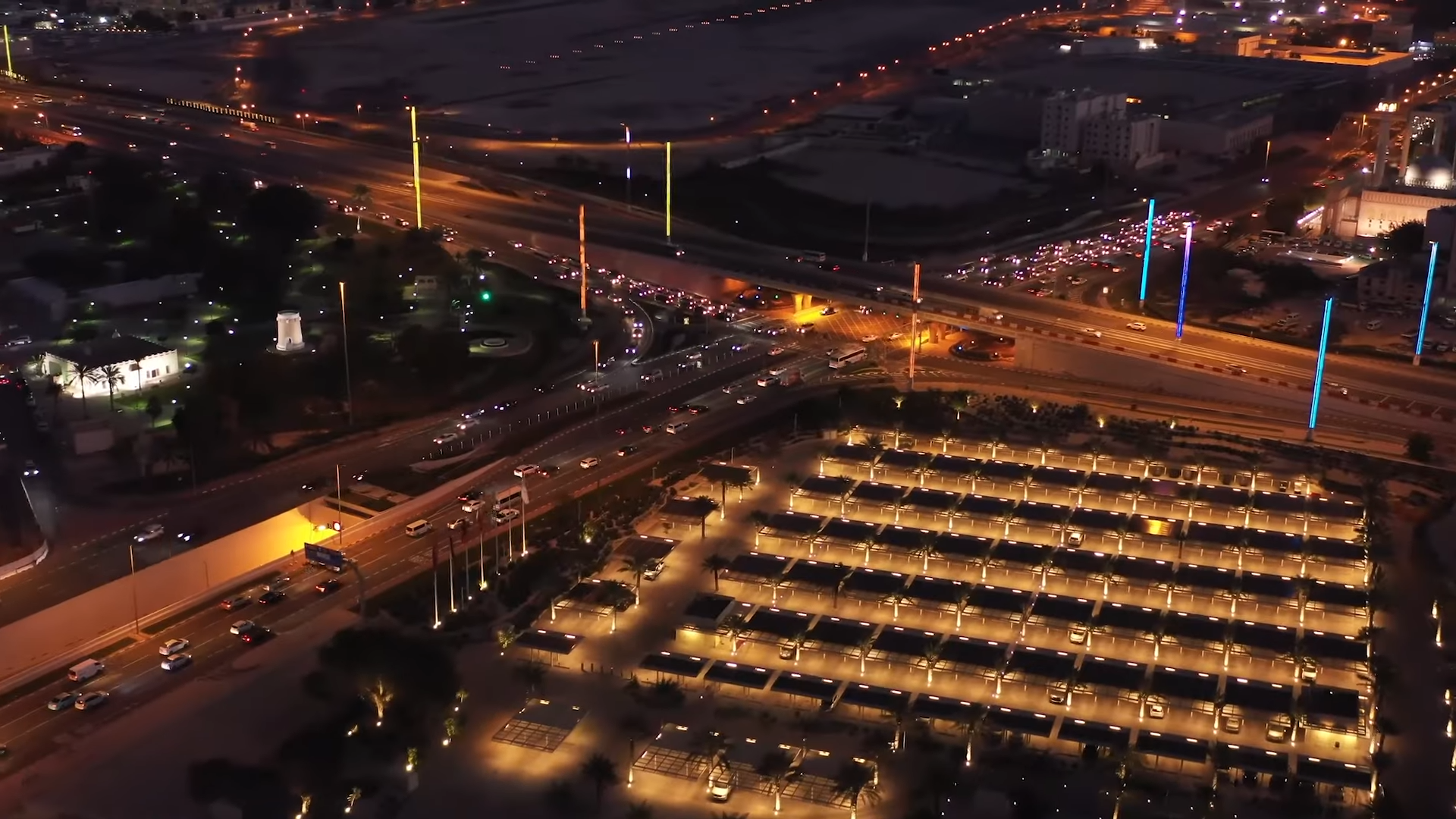
- Doha Club Park in Al Khulaifat (left), bounded by Ras Abu Aboud Street and Al Corniche Road

- Location in Qatar Al Khulaifat (Qatar)
- Coordinates: 25°17′5″N 51°33′19″E
- Country: Qatar
- Municipality: Doha
- Zone: Zone 28
- District no.: 25

Area
  - Total: 0.077 sq mi (0.2 km^{2})
- Elevation: 39 ft (12 m)

Al Khulaifat (Arabic: الخليفات, romanized: Al Khulayfāt; also spelled Al Khalifat) is a district in Qatar, located in the municipality of Doha.

Al Khulaifat borders the following districts:

- Old Al Hitmi & As Salatah to the west, separated by Corniche Street.
- Doha Port to the north, separated by the Doha Bay.
- Ras Abu Aboud to the east.
- Doha International Airport to the south, separated by Ras Bu Abboud Street.

== History ==
The Al Khulaifat district, which derives its name from the local Al Khualifat tribe (also known as Al Kholaifi or Khulaifi), first appeared in maps around the 1940s.

In order to capitalize on Al Khulaifat's close proximity to the Doha International Airport, one of Qatar's first and most important hotels was constructed in the district in 1965 under the name Oasis Hotel. This hotel would serve as the quarters of international diplomats and members of government during their visits to Doha. It thus played an important role in facilitating Qatar's earliest relations with other nations. Additionally, the Beach Club and the Doha Sailing Association had their headquarters behind the hotel, on the waterfront. At the time of Qatar's independence in 1971, Oasis Hotel was one of the country's two hotels and the Doha Sailing Club was one of the two main clubs whose membership consisted mainly of Western expats. In the later 20th century, these two clubs relocated outside the district, and in the early 2000s, the Oasis Hotel was closed.

== Landmarks ==
- Ali Bin Ali Al Khulaifi Mosque on Al Sharq Street.
- Cultural Saloon (managed by the Ministry of Culture and Sports) on Al Sharq Street.
- Al Jawhara Gallery on Al Sharq Street.
- Doha Club Park on Al Sharq Street.
- Doha Sports Center on Al Sharq Street.
