= Zone 39, Qatar =

Zone 39
- Zone
- Interactive map of Zone 39
- Coordinates: 25.274223°N 51.499880°E
- Country: Qatar
- Municipality: Doha
- Blocks: 103

Area
  - Total: 2.74 km^{2} (1.06 sq mi)

Population (2015)
  - Total: 23,853
  - Density: 8,710/km^{2} (22,500/sq mi)
- Time zone: UTC+03 (Arabia Standard Time)
- ISO 3166 code: QA-DA

Zone 39 is a zone of the municipality of Doha in the state of Qatar. The main districts recorded in the 2015 population census were Al Sadd, New Al Mirqab, and Fereej Al Nasr.

== Demographics ==
Year	Population
1986	7,365
1997	9,889
2004	10,983
2010	15,184
2015	23,853

== Land use ==
The Ministry of Municipality and Environment's breakdown of land use in the zone is as follows.

Area (km^{2})	Developed land (km^{2})	Undeveloped land (km^{2})	Residential (km^{2})	Commercial/ Industrial (km^{2})	Education/ Health (km^{2})	Farming/ Green areas (km^{2})	Other uses (km^{2})
2.74	1.93	0.81	1.35	0.28	0.07	0.00	0.23
