= Al Qassar =

Al Qassar القصار
- District
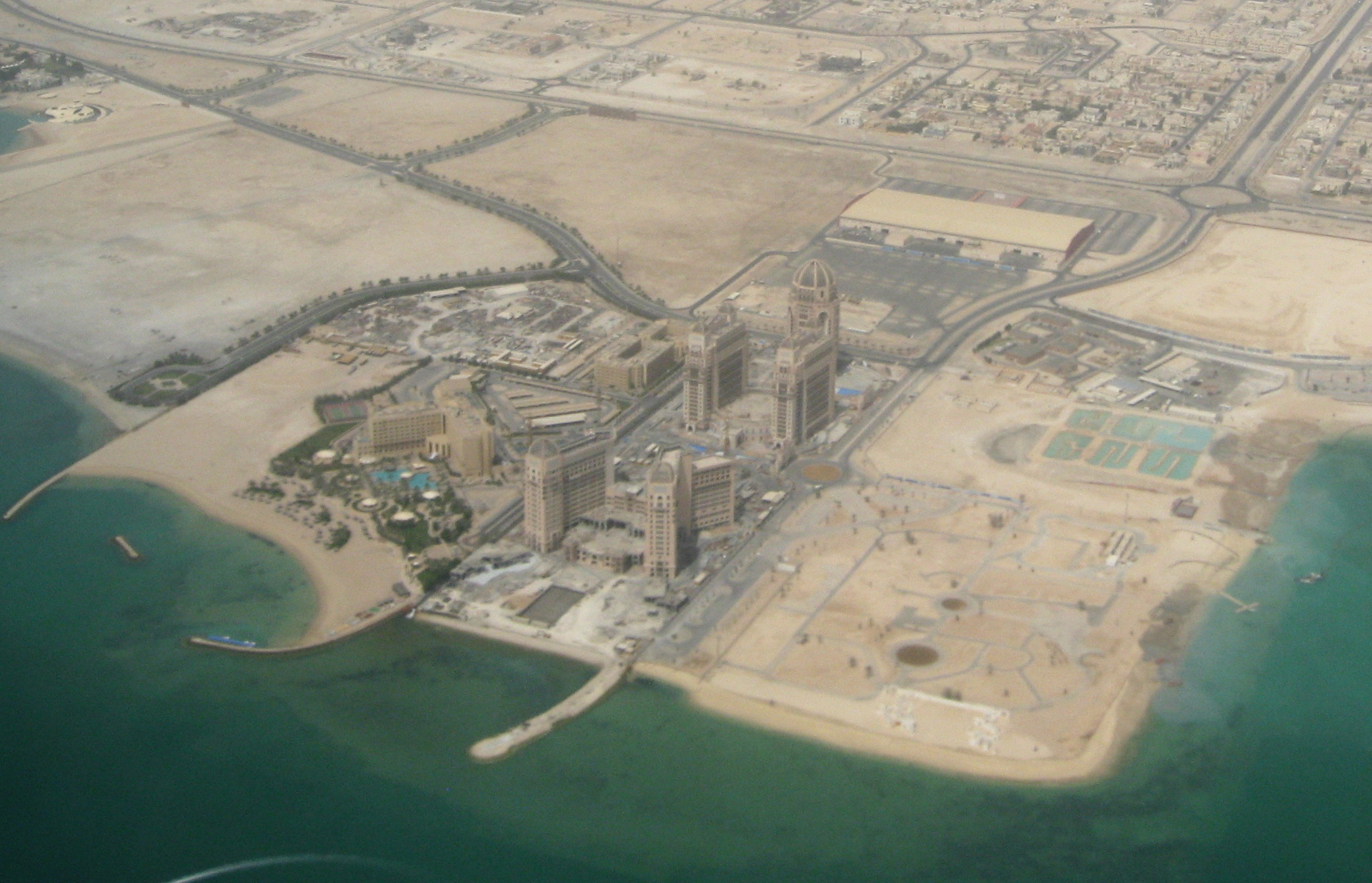
- Aerial view of parts of Al Qassar 61 (left) and Al Qassar 66, separated by Katara Street, in 2010

- Location within Doha Location within Qatar
- Coordinates: 25.3509°N 51.5275°E
- Country: Qatar
- Municipality: Doha
- Zone: Zone 61, Zone 66
- District no.: 106

Area
  - Total: 2.8 km^{2} (1.1 sq mi)

Al Qassar (Arabic: القصار, romanized: Al Qaşşār; also spelled to as Al Gassar) is a seafront district on Qatar's eastern coast, located in the municipality of Doha.

In the 2015 census it formed Zone 61 with Al Dafna and Zone 66 with Onaiza and Leqtaifiya.

== Etymology ==
In Arabic, qassar is a word used for small black rocks found around beaches. The district received its name because of its high concentration of these rocks.

== History ==
Al Qassar was built on land that was reclaimed in the 1970s and 1980s after extensive dredging. As part of a masterplan by the Qatari government, the entire area, which came to be known as West Bay, was to be developed as Qatar's new business center.

== Geography ==
Al Qassar borders the following districts:

- West Bay Lagoon and Onaiza to the west, separated by Lusail Street.
- The Pearl to the east, separated by the Persian Gulf.
- Al Dafna to the south, separated by Dafna Street.

== Transport ==
Al Qassar is served by Al Qassar Station which is part of the Red Line of the Doha Metro rapid transit system.

== Archaeology ==
Al Qassar was found to have rock carvings of human and animals by an excavation team in 1979. Most of them have been eroded beyond recognition. Stone blocks containing still-recognizable carvings were cut off and transported to the Qatar National Museum for preservation.

One petroglyph, which contains two different panels carved by more than one individual, depicts two horse riders and a camel. The riders, one behind the other, are holding lances in their upraised hands. The second rider appears to be chasing the first, as his lance is pointed towards the other rider's back. The figure of the second rider is leaning in a forward position, with the lance projecting from his upper body. In front of the riders is a camel with incomplete body features. Archaeologist Muhammad Abdul Nayeem tentatively dated the carving to the second millennium BC.

== Gallery ==
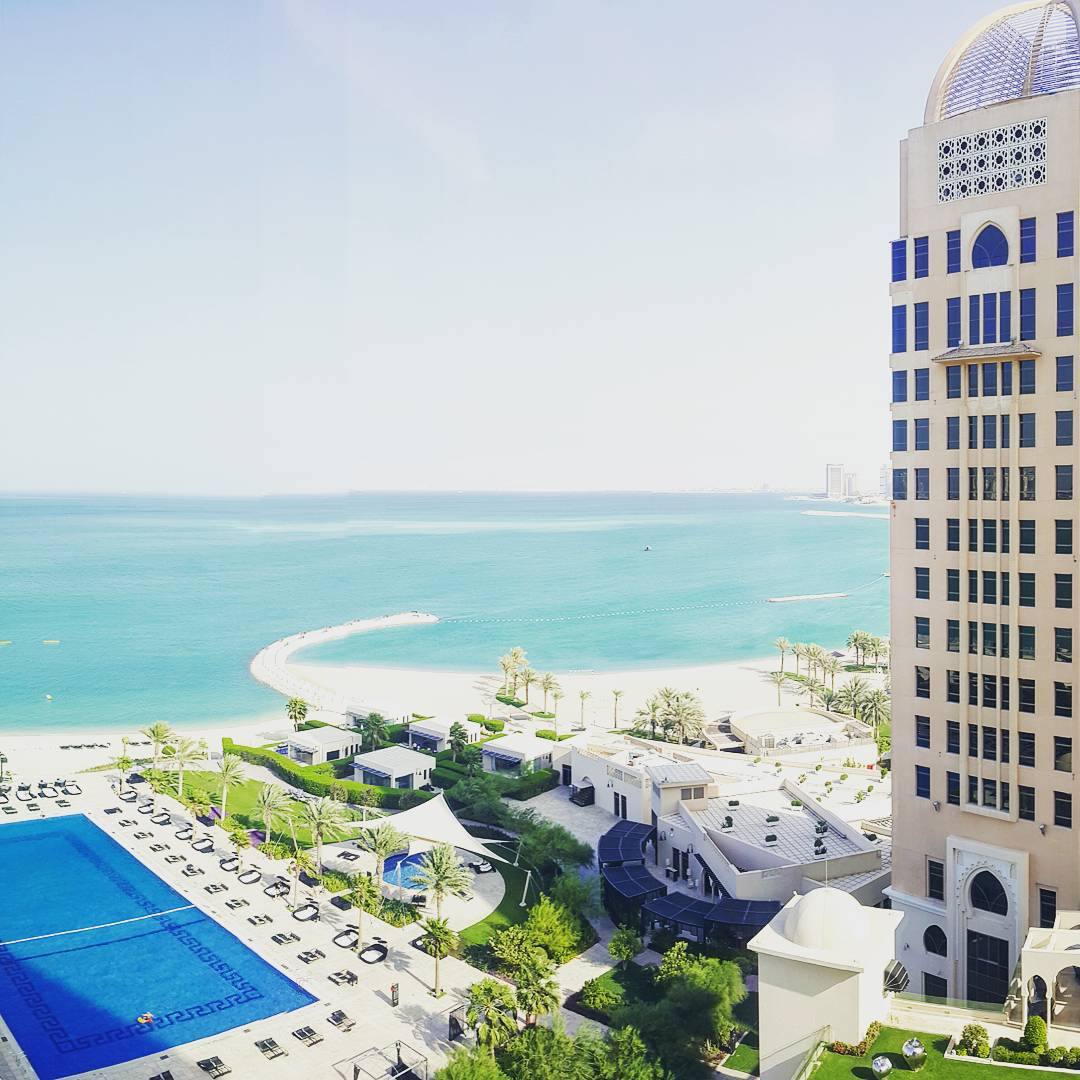
View from the St. Regis Hotel in Al Qassar
