= DECC station =

Metro station in Doha, Qatar

DECC Metro Station
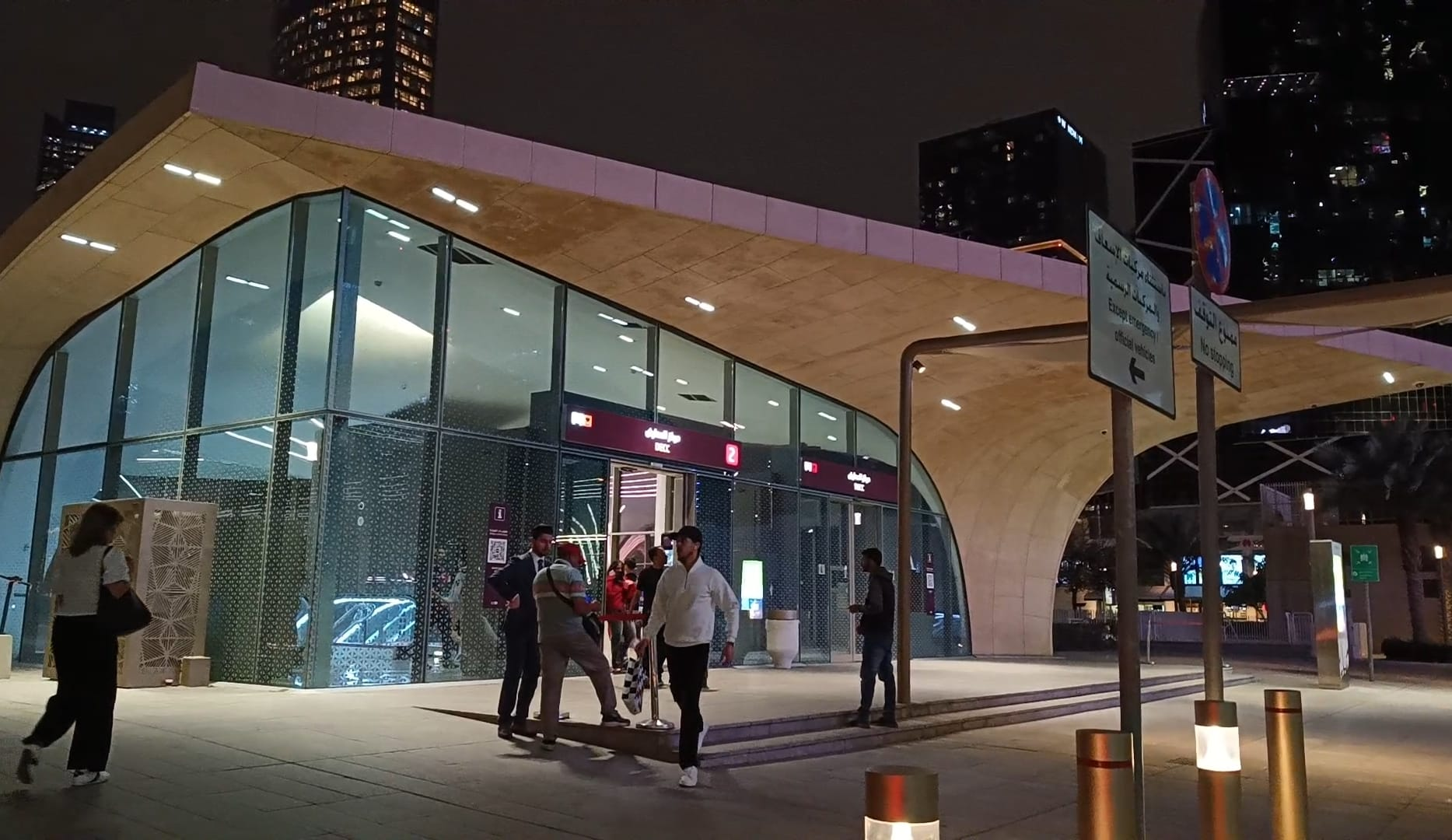
- Station entrance

General information
- Location: Doha Exhibition and Convention Center; Qatar
- Owner: Qatar Rail
- Operator: Doha Metro
- Platforms: 1
- Connections: MetroLink Bus

Construction
- Structure type: Underground
- Accessible: Yes

Other information
- Website: http://www.qr.com.qa/

History
- Opened: 8 May 2019

Services
Preceding station	Doha Metro	Following station
Al Qassar towards Lusail	Red Line	West Bay towards Al Wakra
Location

DECC Station of the Doha Metro's Red Line is located near Doha Exhibition and Convention Center (DECC) and the City Center Mall and is located in the Al Dafna District in Doha, Qatar.

== History ==
As part of the Doha Metro's Phase 1, the station was inaugurated on 8 May 2019, along with most other Red Line stations.

== Station Details ==
Among the station's facilities are a QNB ATM, two prayer rooms and a restroom.

== Metrolink Bus ==
There is only one Metrolink route, which are part of the Doha Metro's feeder bus network, servicing the station:

- M105, leading to Al Dafna.
