= Zone 66, Qatar =

Zone 66
- Zone
- Interactive map of Zone 66
- Coordinates: 25.361211°N 51.542119°E
- Country: Qatar
- Municipality: Doha
- Blocks: 105

Area
  - Total: 26.1 km^{2} (10.1 sq mi)

Population
  - Total: 22,024 (2,015)
- Time zone: UTC+03 (Arabia Standard Time)
- ISO 3166 code: QA-DA

Zone 66 is a zone of the municipality of Doha in the state of Qatar. The main districts recorded in the 2015 population census were Onaiza, Leqtaifiya, and Al Qassar. It also includes The Pearl-Qatar.

== Demographics ==
Year	Population
1986	1,736
1997	3,185
2004	4,471
2010	22,168
2015	22,024

== Land use ==
The Ministry of Municipality and Environment (MME) breaks down land use in the zone as follows.

Area (km^{2})	Developed land (km^{2})	Undeveloped land (km^{2})	Residential (km^{2})	Commercial/ Industrial (km^{2})	Education/ Health (km^{2})	Farming/ Green areas (km^{2})	Other uses (km^{2})
26.14	10.59	15.55	3.73	0.30	0.23	0.03	6.3
