= New Al Mirqab =

New Al Mirqab المرقاب الجديد
- District
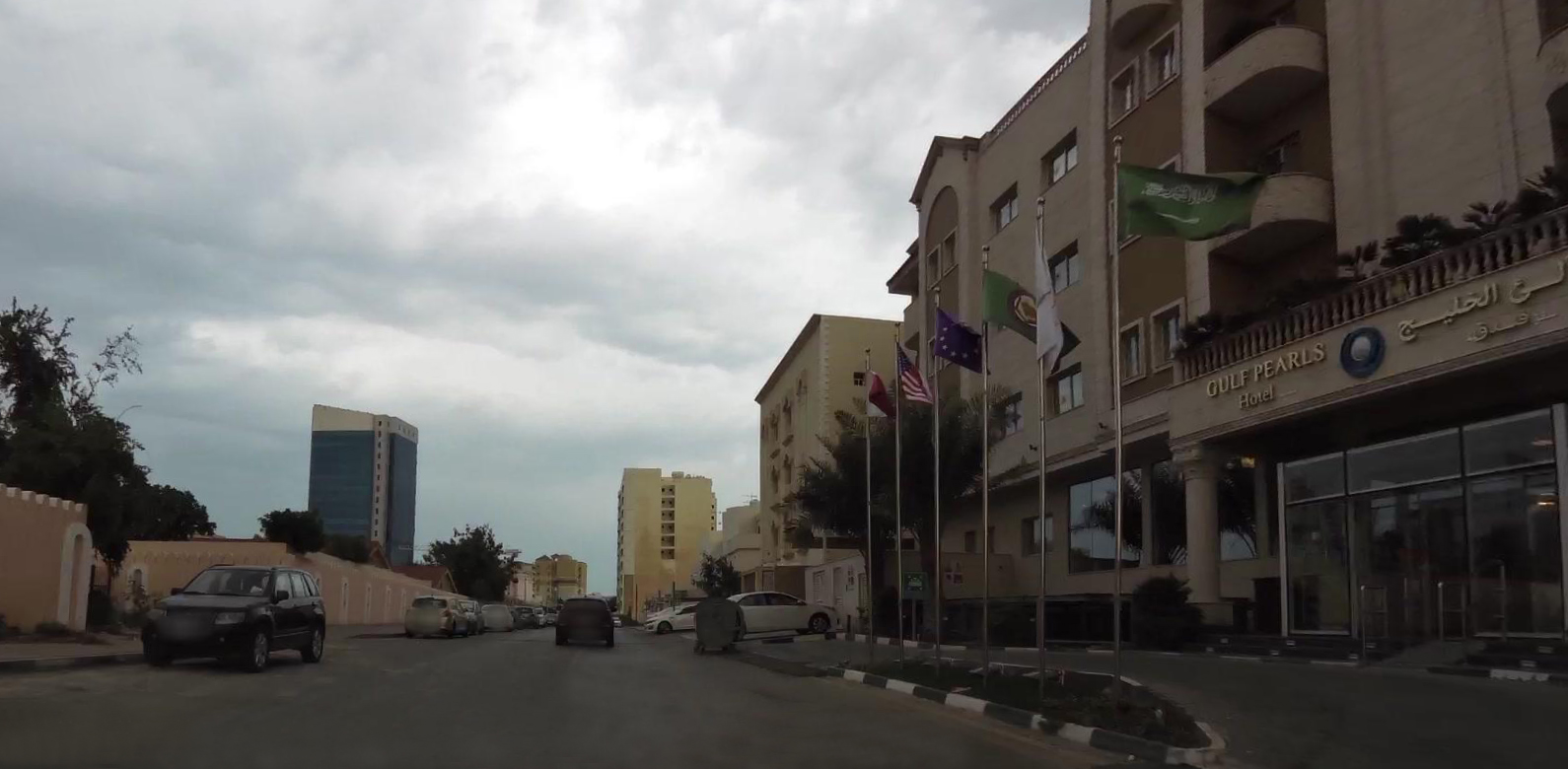
- Al Dhiyaa Street in New Al Mirqab

- Location within Doha Location within Qatar
- Coordinates: 25.271611°N 51.504289°E
- Country: Qatar
- Municipality: Doha
- Zone: Zone 39
- District no.: 39

Area
  - Total: 0.6 km^{2} (0.23 sq mi)

New Al Mirqab (Arabic: المرقاب الجديد, romanized: Al-Mirqāb al-Jadīdah; also referred to as Al Mirqab Al Jadeed) is a district in Qatar, located in the municipality of Doha.

Together with Al Sadd and Fereej Al Nasr, it makes up Zone 39 which has 23,853 people in it.

== Etymology ==
The district derives its name from Al Mirqab district. An Arabic word, mirqab originates from muraqabah, which in English translates to "watching". This name was given in reference to a historic watchtower from which people would identify incoming ships and survey the sea.

== See also ==
- Al Mirqab, also known as Fereej Al Mirqab
