= Zone 61, Qatar =

Zone 61
- Zone
- Interactive map of Zone 61
- Coordinates: 25.337548°N 51.549809°E
- Country: Qatar
- Municipality: Doha
- Blocks: 27

Area
  - Total: 4.0 km^{2} (1.5 sq mi)

Population
  - Total: 4,022 (2,015)
- Time zone: UTC+03 (Arabia Standard Time)
- ISO 3166 code: QA-DA

Zone 61 is a zone of the municipality of Doha in the state of Qatar. The main districts recorded in the 2015 population census were Al Dafna and Al Qassar.

== Demographics ==
Year	Population
1986	159
1997	437
2004	1,282
2010	2,782
2015	4,022

== Land use ==
The Ministry of Municipality and Environment (MME) breaks down land use in the zone as follows.

Area (km^{2})	Developed land (km^{2})	Undeveloped land (km^{2})	Residential (km^{2})	Commercial/ Industrial (km^{2})	Education/ Health (km^{2})	Farming/ Green areas (km^{2})	Other uses (km^{2})
4.00	2.44	1.56	0.09	0.10	0.00	0.00	2.25
