= Zone 28, Qatar =

Zone 28
- Zone
- Interactive map of Zone 28
- Coordinates: 25.283139°N 51.561062°E
- Country: Qatar
- Municipality: Doha
- Blocks: 20

Area
  - Total: 0.9 km^{2} (0.35 sq mi)

Population
  - Total: 1,731 (2,015)
- Time zone: UTC+03 (Arabia Standard Time)
- ISO 3166 code: QA-DA

Zone 28 is a zone of the municipality of Doha in the state of Qatar. The main districts recorded in the 2015 population census were Al Khulaifat and Ras Abu Aboud.

== Demographics ==
| Year | Population |
|---|---|
| 1986 | 1,267 |
| 1997 | 1,554 |
| 2004 | 1,479 |
| 2010 | 1,868 |
| 2015 | 1,731 |

== Land use ==
The Ministry of Municipality and Environment (MME) breaks down land use in the zone as follows.

| Area (km^{2}) | Developed land (km^{2}) | Undeveloped land (km^{2}) | Residential (km^{2}) | Commercial/ Industrial (km^{2}) | Education/ Health (km^{2}) | Farming/ Green areas (km^{2}) | Other uses (km^{2}) |
|---|---|---|---|---|---|---|---|
| 0.94 | 0.69 | 0.25 | 0.29 | 0.00 | 0.00 | 0.00 | 0.4 |
