= West Bay Lagoon =

Leqtaifiya لقطيفية West Bay Lagoon
- District
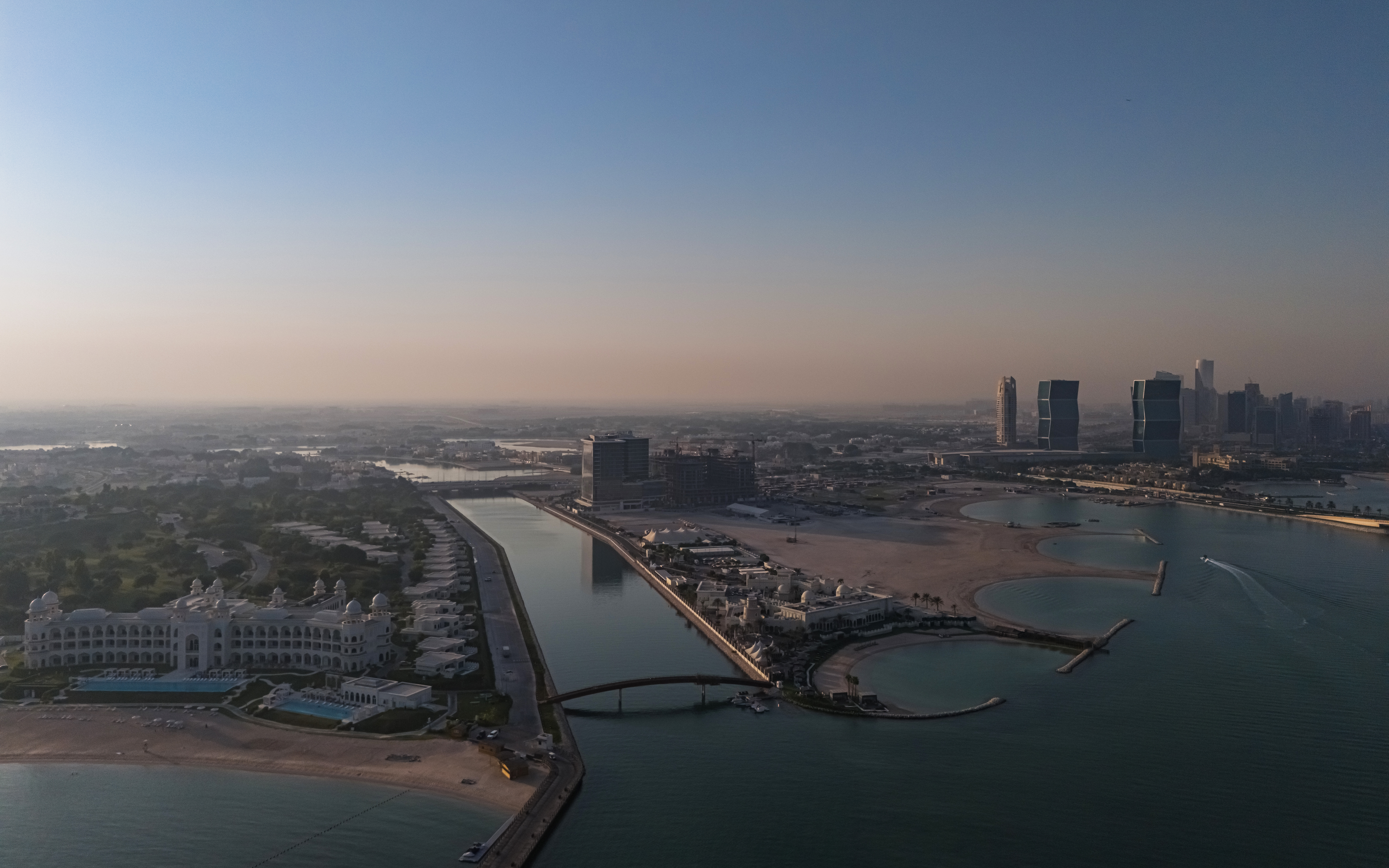
- Aerial view of West Bay Lagoon in 2024

- Location within Doha Location within Qatar
- Coordinates: 25°21′30″N 51°30′29″E
- Country: Qatar
- Municipality: Doha
- Zone: Zone 66
- District no.: 105

Area
  - Total: 8.6 km^{2} (3.3 sq mi)

West Bay Lagoon, also known as Leqtaifiya (Arabic: لقطيفية; also spelled as Legtaifiyah, Legtaifiya or Al Qutaifiya) is a district of Doha, the capital city of Qatar. Spanning from the Doha Corniche to West Bay Lagoon, the area has villas on one side, and low rises on the other. The district is well known for its luxurious waterfront villas, which are some of the most expensive in the country. It is one of the few freehold areas in Doha where non-Qataris can purchase property.

Together with Onaiza and Al Qassar, it makes up Zone 66 which has a total population of 22,024.

== Etymology ==
The district's official name, Leqtaifiya, is a derivative of a plant known locally as qataf (Limonium axillare) which is found abundantly in the area.

== History ==
West Bay Lagoon was built on land that was reclaimed in the 1970s and 1980s after extensive dredging. As part of a masterplan by the Qatari government, the entire area, which came to be known as West Bay, was to be developed as Qatar's new business center, with West Bay Lagoon containing a bulk of the housing. At its greatest distance, the district extends 2 km away from the Persian Gulf. There are several artificial lagoons in the district.

During the 2006 Asian Games, temporary seating for 500 spectators was provided for the water sports taking place in the lagoon, including kayaking, rowing and canoeing competitions.

On 9 September, 2025, Israel launched an airstrike on Doha, targeting a Hamas meeting which was taking place in a residential complex near Wadi Rawdan Street in West Bay Lagoon. Six people were killed.

== Transport ==
The Legtaifiya metro station is located here and is part of Doha Metro's Red Line North.

== Education ==
The following schools are located in West Bay Lagoon (Leqtaifiya):

Name of School	Curriculum	Grade	Genders	Official Website	Ref
Abi Haneefa Model Boys School	Independent	Kindergarten – Primary	Male-only	N/A	
Kingdom Kindergarten	International	Kindergarten	Both	N/A	
Newton International Kindergarten	International	Kindergarten	Both	Official website	

== Gallery ==
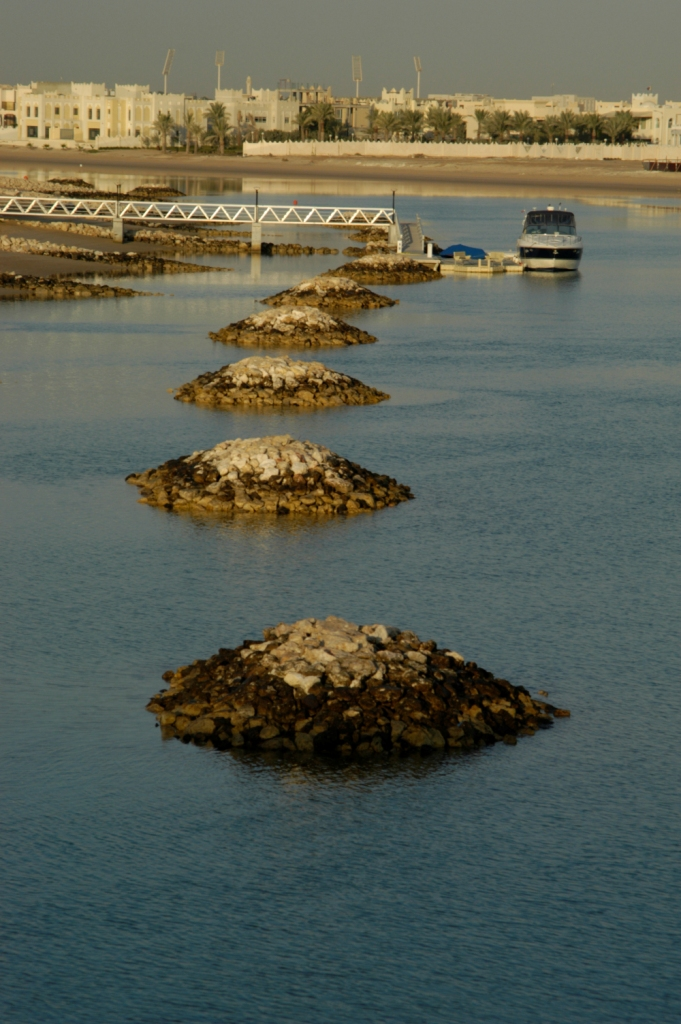
Al Qutaifiya Lagoon

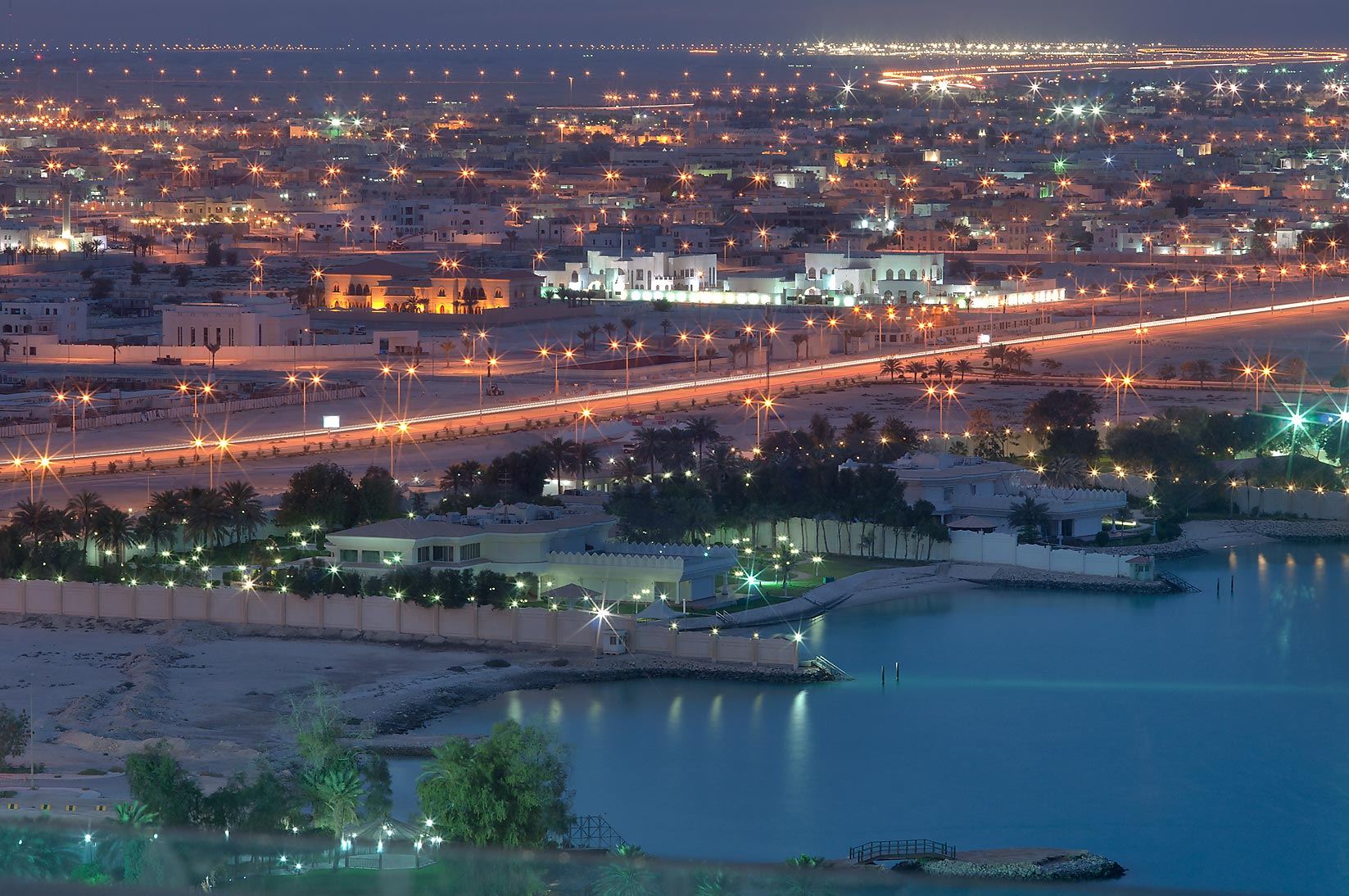
Residences in West Bay Lagoon

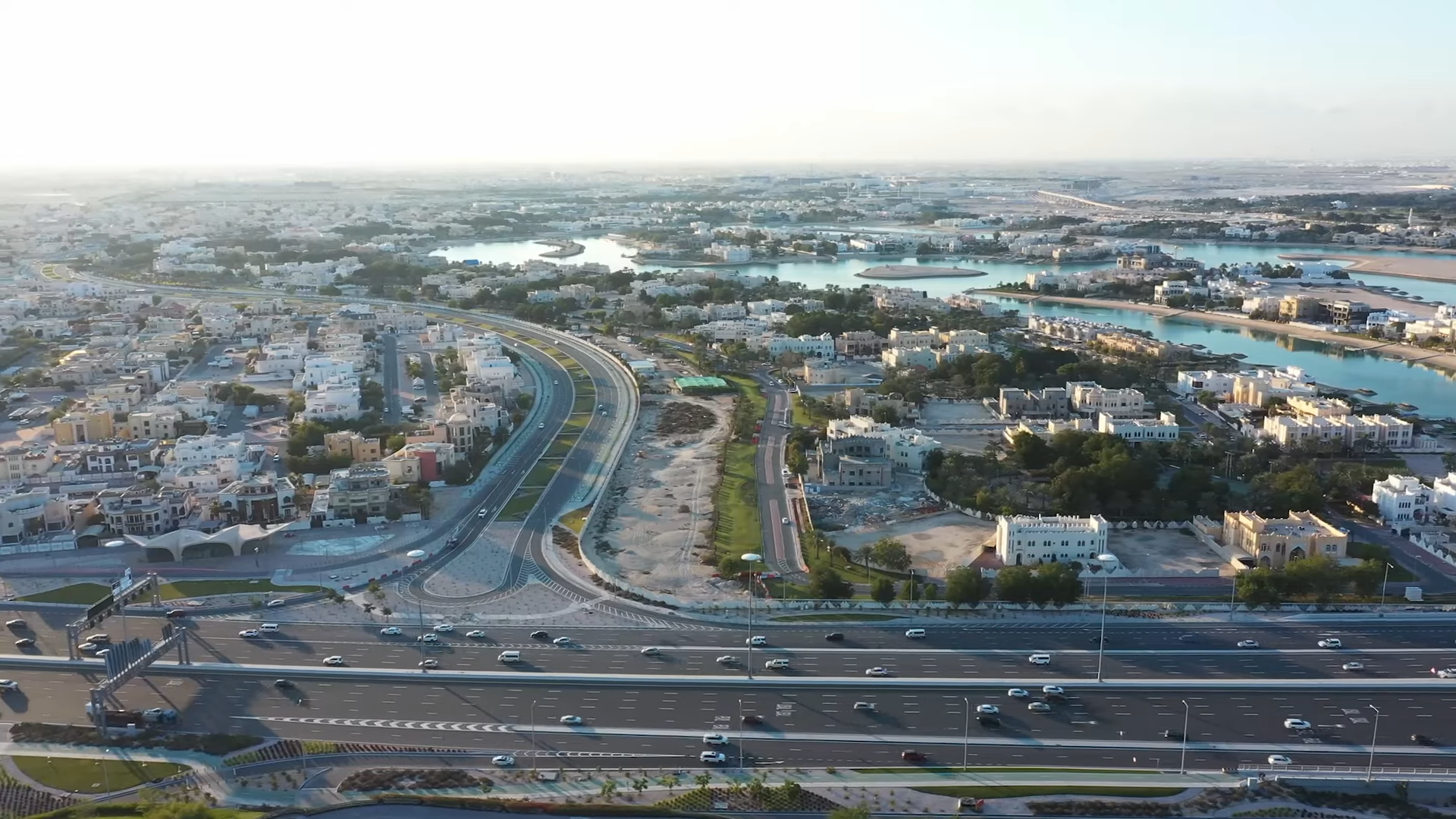
Aerial view of West Bay Lagoon

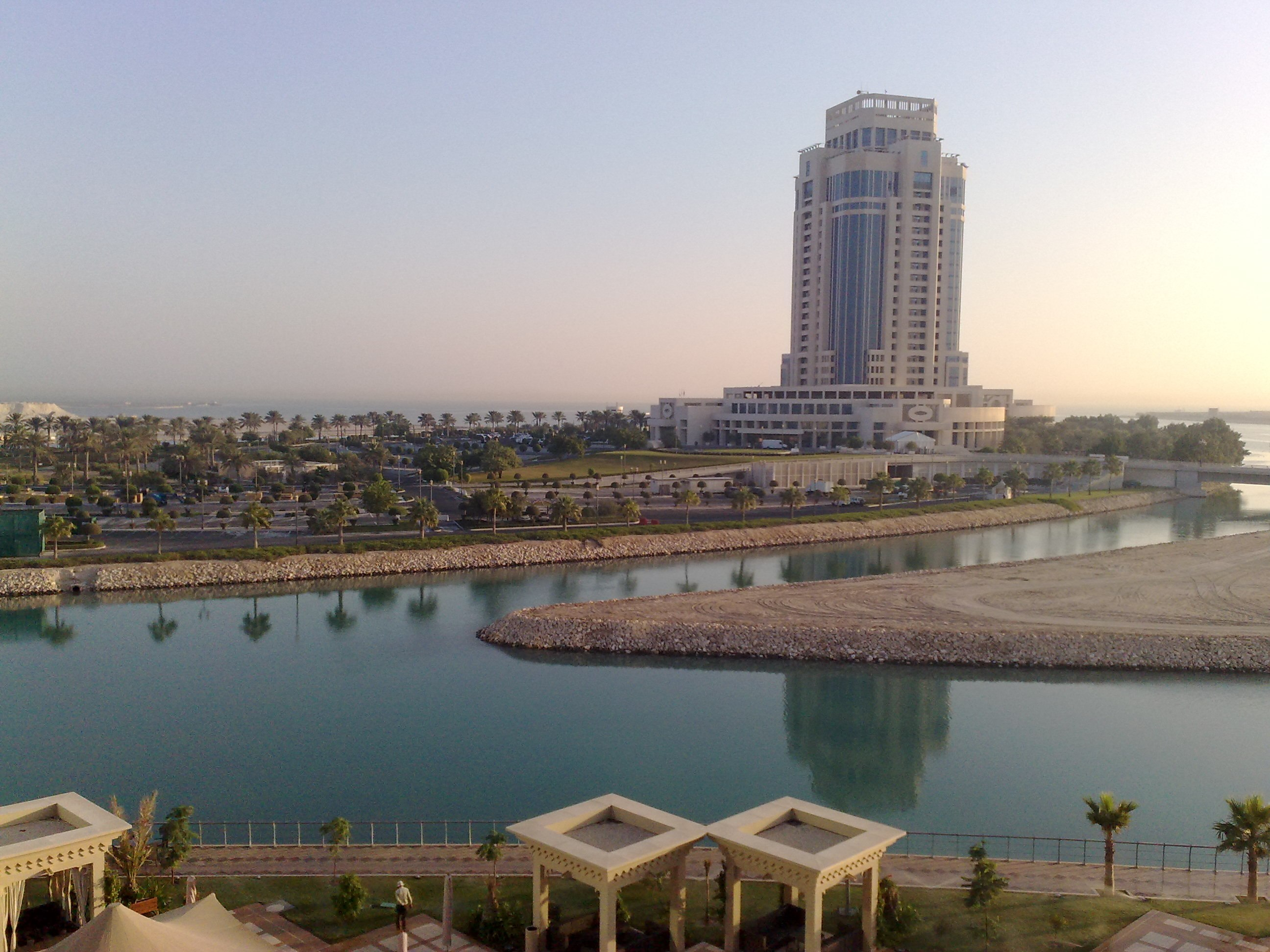
View of West Bay Lagoon from the Grand Hyatt Hotel
