= Lycée Bonaparte =

French international school in Doha, Qatar

Coordinates: 25.3264°N 51.5216°E

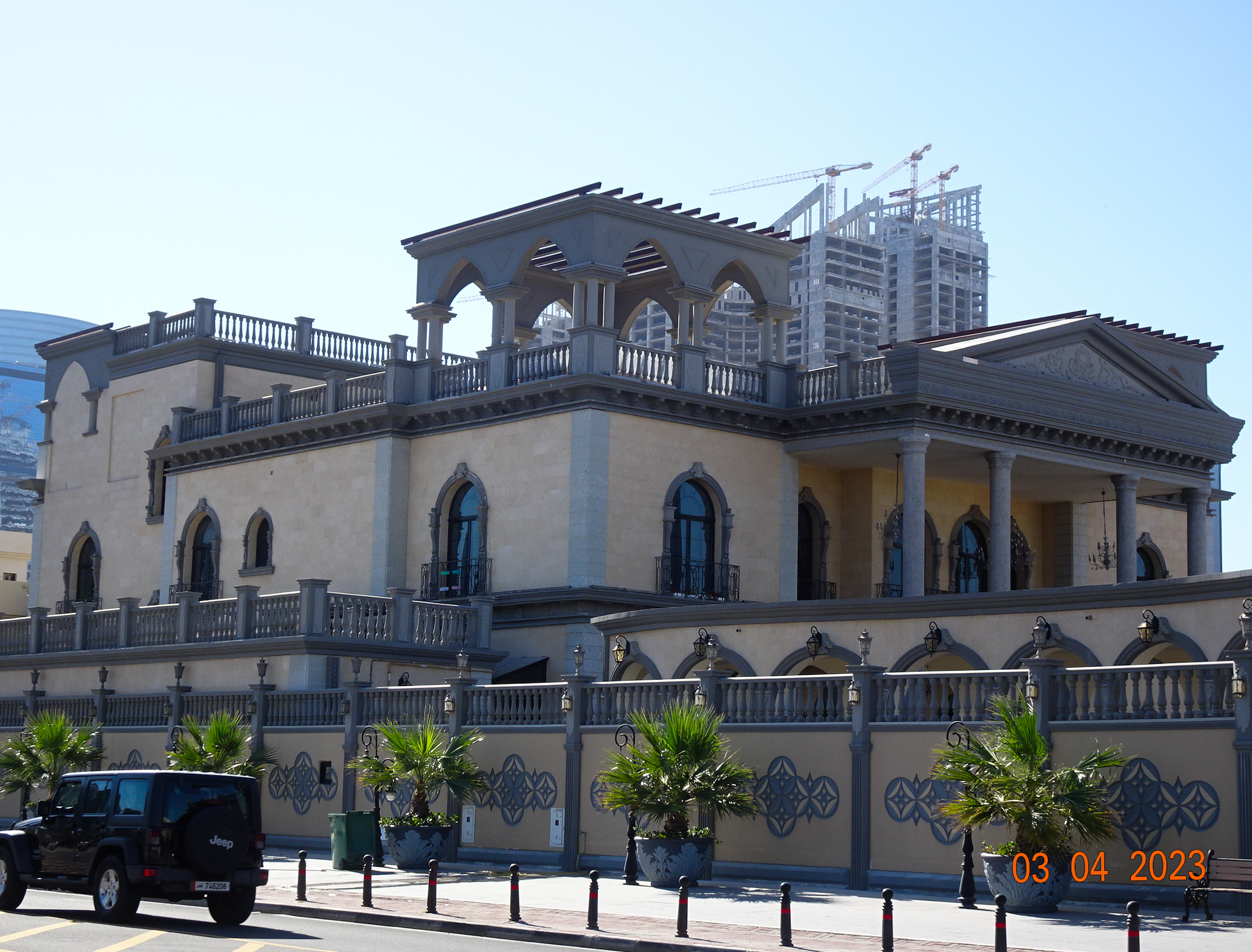
Lycée Bonaparte building in Onaiza, Qatar

Lycée Bonaparte is a French international school in Doha, Qatar. It includes levels maternelle (preschool) through lycée (senior high school).

It is named after French Emperor Napoleon.

The École Française de Doha was established in a rented villa in Slata Al Jadida in the 1970s. The school had a temporary decline during the Gulf War because many families left Qatar. The school rebounded as the school moved into new premises, designed in an Arab-Islamic style and leased on behalf of the French Embassy in Qatar. The school was designated a high school around that time.
