= Al Dafna =

Al Dafna الدفنة
- District
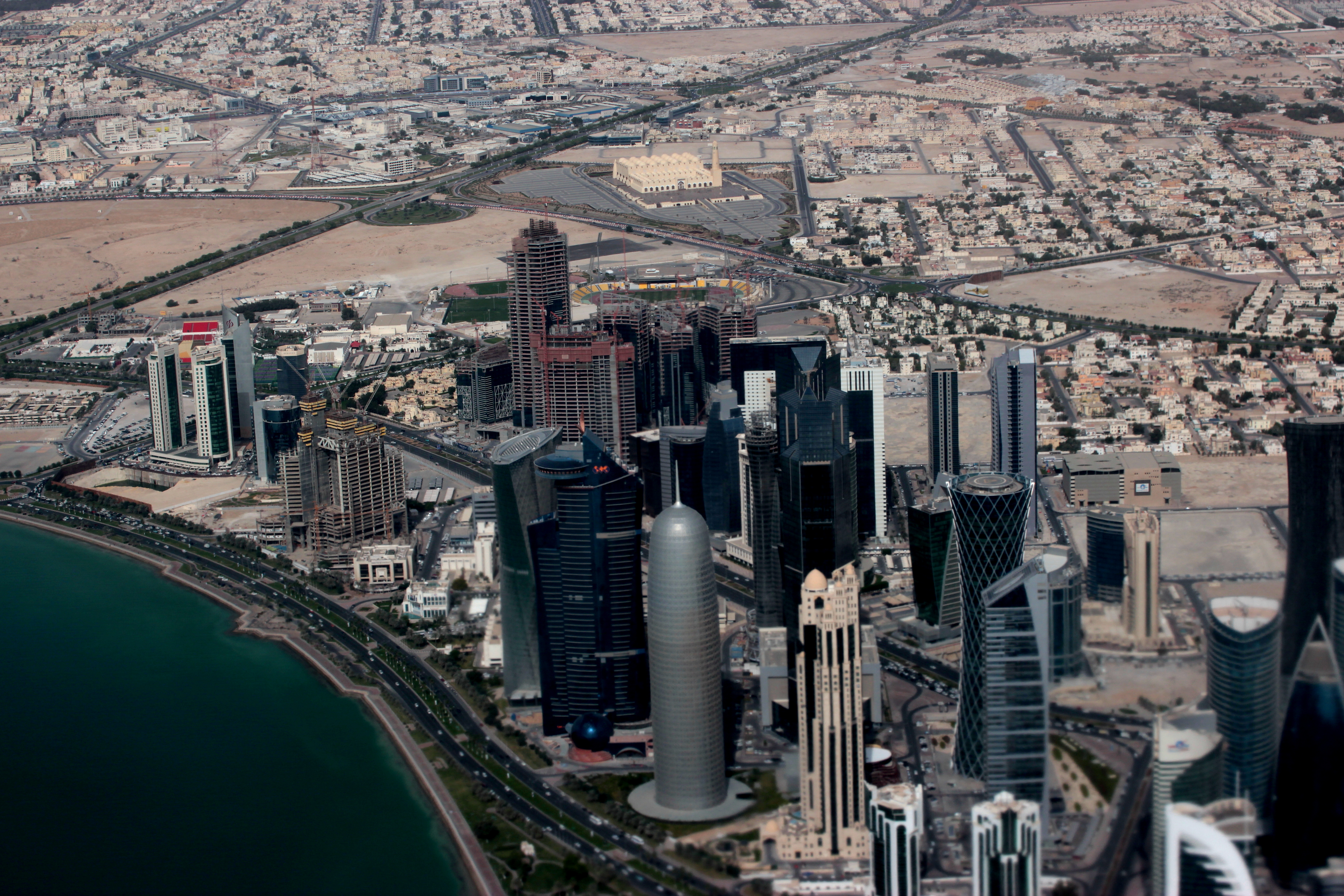
- Skyscrapers in Al Dafna

- Al Dafna Al Dafna (Qatar)
- Coordinates: 25°19′26″N 51°31′50″E
- Country: Qatar
- Municipality: Doha
- Zone: Zone 61
- District no.: 101

Area
  - Total: 3.2 km^{2} (1.2 sq mi)

Al Dafna (Arabic: الدفنة) is a seaside district of the Qatari capital Doha located on the Persian Gulf. The district is rapidly developing into a central business district, and since the late 1990s dozens of skyscrapers have risen in the district, with over fifty more planned. The district is also home to the City Center mall, one of the Middle East's largest malls.

The district was created in the mid-1980s following a massive land reclamation project along Doha's coastline, and started to develop in the mid-1990s. Currently, Al Dafna is rapidly becoming Doha's new downtown district and, with the massive amount of recent development towards the north of Doha, it is also rapidly becoming the new centre of the city. Housing in the district is mainly up-scale apartments and many foreign consuls reside here.

== Etymology ==
In Arabic, dafna roughly means "dredged land", a reference to the fact that the district was built upon reclaimed land.

== History ==
The decision to reclaim the land which would eventually become Al Dafna was first proposed in the 1970s after the government had difficulties in negotiating with land-owning tribes in downtown Doha. Rather than force the tribes to sell their lands, the government decided that the most feasible option was to initiate a massive dredging project along Doha's coastline. This project was underway from 1978 to 1981. American architectural firm William Pereira & Associates were hired to design the newly reclaimed area.

Pereira's master plan was not wholly successful in its execution due to economic strains caused by falling oil prices in the 1980s, however, the 456-room Sheraton Grand Doha Resort & Convention Hotel built in 1979 and the Conference and Exhibition Centre inaugurated in 1982 were among his initial successes. As a result of relatively lower oil prices, it was not until the late 1990s that the government would once again begin developing the district.

== Geography ==
Al Dafna borders the following districts:

- Rumeilah to the south, separated by Mohammed Bin Jassim Street.
- Wadi Al Sail, Onaiza and Lekhwair to the west, separated by Al Bidda Street.
- Al Qassar to the north, separated by Dafna Street.
- The Persian Gulf to the east.

== Attractions ==
Al Dafna features some of the most upscale hotels, restaurants and shopping avenues in the country, including City Center Mall. Additionally, it lies close to Hamad International Airport. In addition, the Katara Cultural Village is situated in Al Dafna, which harbors theaters, concert halls, exhibition galleries and other facilities for multicultural activities and entertainment. One of its attractions is the Katara Amphitheatre, which is built in an ancient style.

== Education ==
The following schools are located in Al Dafna:

Name of School	Curriculum	Grade	Genders	Official Website	Ref
Al Hekma International School	International	Kindergarten – Secondary	Both	Official website	
Cardiff International Primary School	International	Primary	Both	N/A	
SEK International School	International	Primary	Both	Official website	
