= As Salatah al Jadidah =

As Salatah al Jadidah السلطة الجديدة
- District
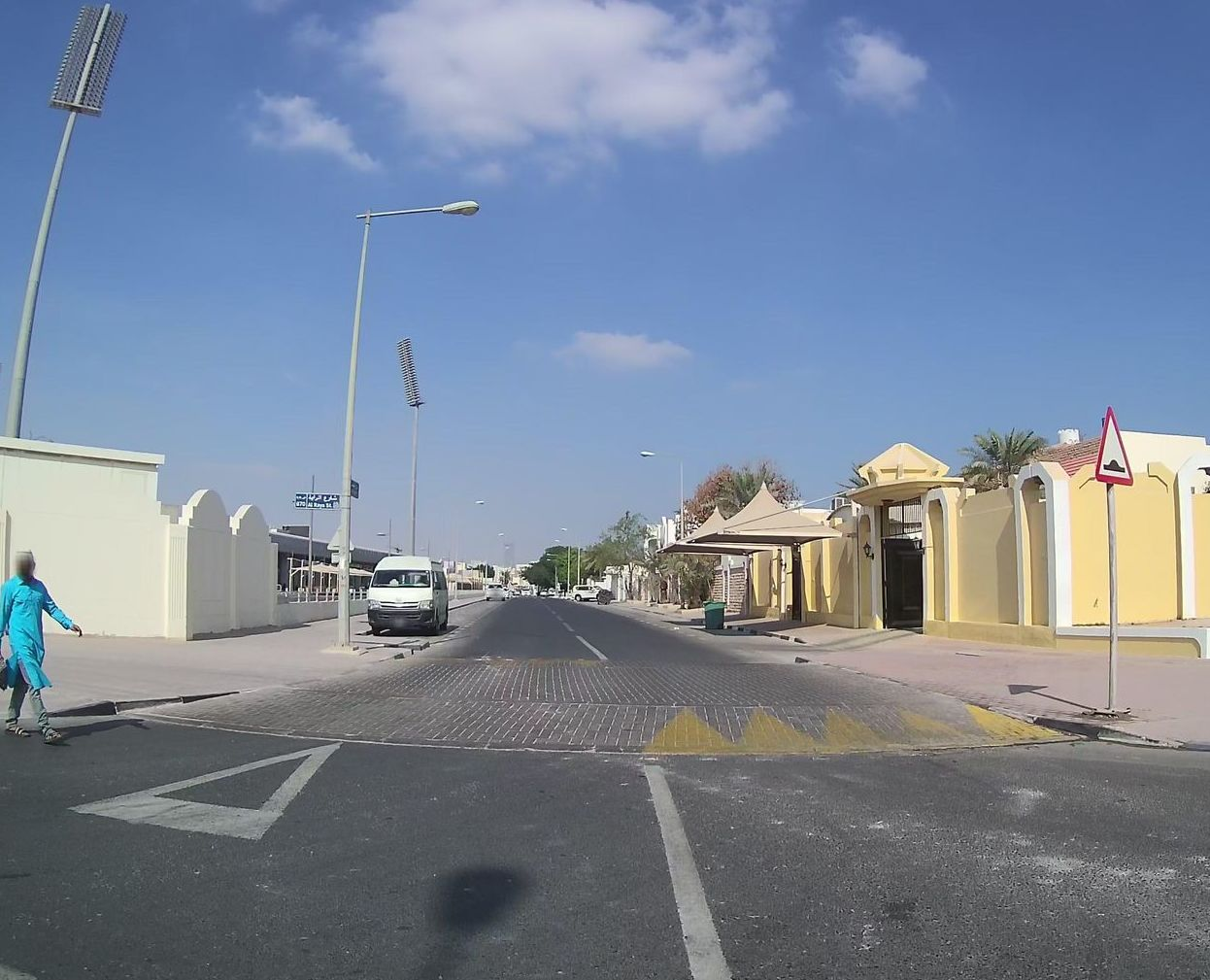
- Al Raya Street in New Salata

- Location within Doha Location within Qatar
- Coordinates: 25°16′N 51°31′E
- Country: Qatar
- Municipality: Doha
- Zone: Zone 40
- District no.: District 41

Area
  - Total: 3.5 km^{2} (1.4 sq mi)

Population (2010)
  - Total: 15,114
  - Density: 4,300/km^{2} (11,000/sq mi)

As Salatah al Jadidah (Arabic: السلطة الجديدة; also referred to as New Salata) is a district in Qatar, located in the municipality of Doha.

== History ==
As Salah Al Jadidah translates to "New Salata" and was named after the Al-Sulaiti tribe. It was founded by inhabitants of Doha's coastal As Salatah district who moved to the west of Doha in 1970s. During that time, the area was uninhabited and undeveloped; located just outside city boundaries. It was built up over the years and connected to Doha's main districts through the C-Ring Road.

== Demographics ==
As of the 2010 census, the district comprised 2,733 housing units and 363 establishments. There were 15,114 people living in the district, of which 54% were male and 46% were female. Out of the 679 inhabitants, 72% were 20 years of age or older and 28% were under the age of 20. The literacy rate stood at 96.7%.

Employed persons made up 55% of the total population. Females accounted for 36% of the working population, while males accounted for 64% of the working population.

== Sports ==
New Salata hosts the headquarters of Al Arabi SC and its home venue, the 13,000-capacity Grand Hamad Stadium.

The Qatar Volleyball Association (QVA) has its headquarters in New Salata.

== Visitor attractions ==
New Salata Park (formerly known as Al Assiry Park) was established in 1988 and spans an area of 7,313 square meters. It was refurbished in 2004. Situated on Al-Maheem Street, the park is accompanied by various ornamental tree species and offers both a play area and a skating rink for children.

== Transport ==
Major roads that run through the district are Salwa Road, C Ring Road, D Ring Road, Ali Bin Abi Taleb Street, and Rawdat Al Khail Street.
