= Fereej Kulaib =

Fereej Kulaib فريج كليب
- District
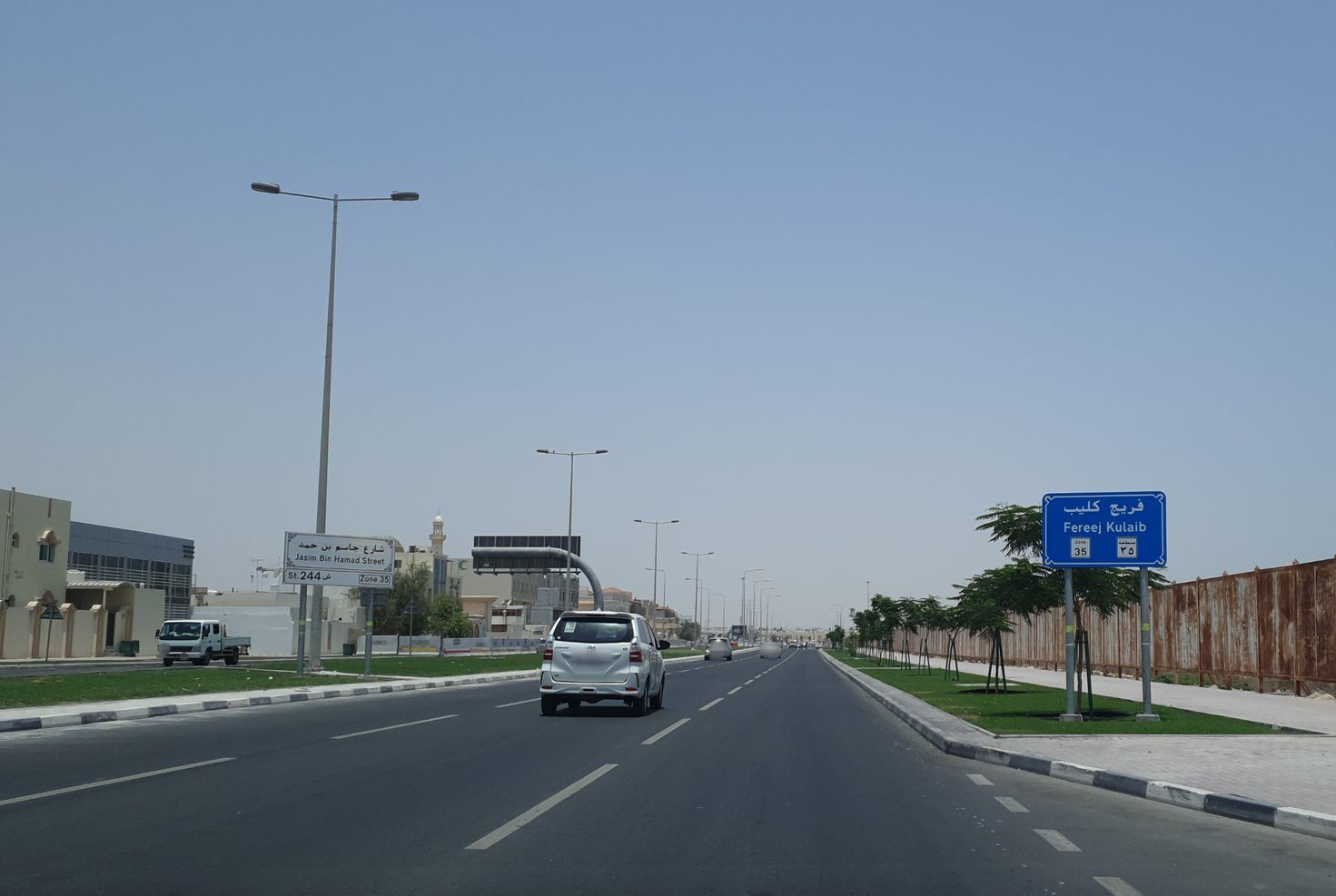
- Sign for Fereej Kulaib on Jassim Bin Hamad Street

- Location within Doha Location within Qatar
- Coordinates: 25°18′50″N 51°29′30″E
- Country: Qatar
- Municipality: Doha
- Zone: Zone 35
- District no.: 33

Area
  - Total: 1.1 km^{2} (0.42 sq mi)

Population
  - Total: 7,702
  - Density: 7,000/km^{2} (18,000/sq mi)

Fereej Kulaib (Arabic: فريج كليب, romanized: Farīj Kulaīb) is a Qatari district located in the municipality of Doha.

== Landmarks ==
- Daawa Department of the Ministry of Awqaf and Islamic Affairs on Al Jazira Al Arabiya Street.
- Arab Towns Organization on Kulaib Street.
- Embassy of The Federal Republic of Germany in Doha on Al Jazira Al Arabiya Street.
- Qatar Gymnastics Federation on Al Wabra Street.

== Transport ==
Major roads that run through the district are Al Jazira Al Arabiya Street, Jassim Bin Hamad Street, Ahmed Bin Ali Street, and Ibn Obada Street.

Currently, the underground Fereej Kulaib Metro Station is under construction, having been launched during Phase 2A. Once completed, it will be part of Doha Metro's Green Line.

== Qatar National Master Plan ==
The Qatar National Master Plan (QNMP) is described as a "spatial representation of the Qatar National Vision 2030". As part of the QNMP's Urban Centre plan, which aims to implement development strategies in 28 central hubs that will serve their surrounding communities, Fereej Kulaib has been designated a District Centre, which is the lowest designation.

Development of the District Centre will take place along Khalifa Avenue, with the bulk of the work being carried an undeveloped plot at the south-east section of Khalifa Avenue and Jassim Bin Hamad Street. The area around the heart of the District Centre is primarily a residential area and has two large schools nearby. Metro stations will provide accessibility to the area from the Centre's western and eastern corners, respectively. Two zones will fall within the Centre's jurisdiction: Zone 33 (Al Markhiya) and Zone 35 (Fereej Kulaib).

== Demographics ==
As of the 2010 census, the district comprised 1,468 housing units and 198 establishments. There were 7,702 people living in the district, of which 60% were male and 40% were female. Out of the 679 inhabitants, 73% were 20 years of age or older and 27% were under the age of 20. The literacy rate stood at 95.7%.

Employed persons made up 60% of the total population. Females accounted for 26% of the working population, while males accounted for 74% of the working population.

| Year | Population |
|---|---|
| 1986 | 2,776 |
| 1997 | 4,323 |
| 2004 | 5,311 |
| 2010 | 7,702 |

== Education ==
The following schools are located in Fereej Kulaib:

| Name of School | Curriculum | Grade | Genders | Official Website | Ref |
|---|---|---|---|---|---|
| Doha English Speaking School | International | Kindergarten – Primary | Both | N/A | |
| Modern Caring World Nursery | International | Kindergarten | Both | Official website | |
