= Fereej Al Nasr (Doha) =

Fereej Al Nasr فريج النصر
- District
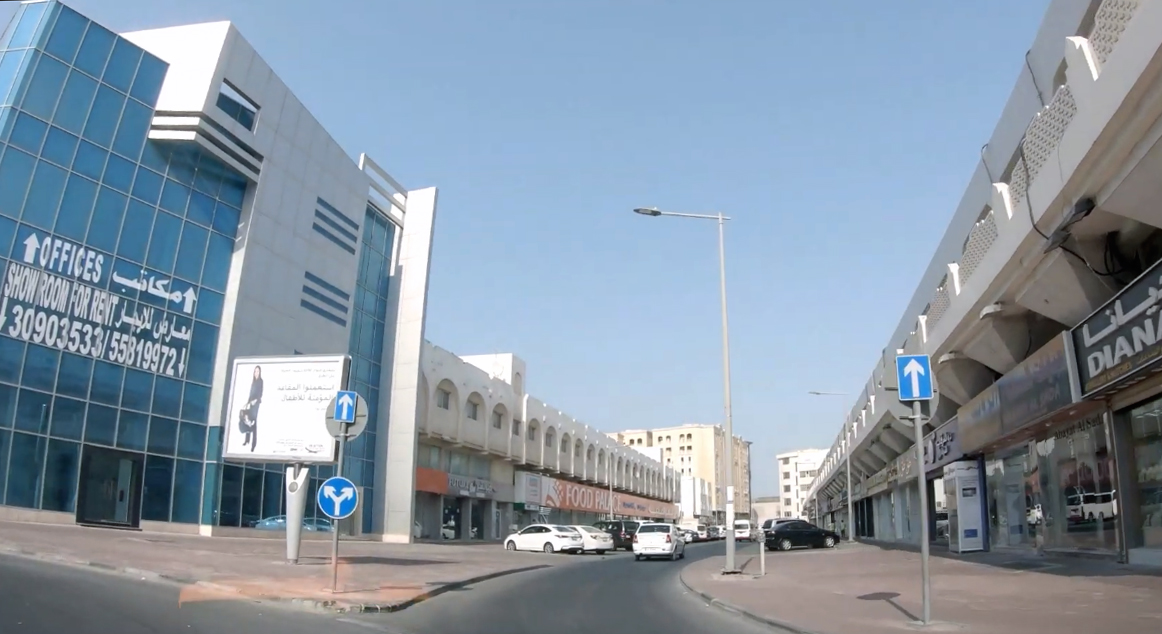
- Al Mirqab Al Jadeed Street in Fereej Al Nasr

- Location within Doha Location within Qatar
- Coordinates: 25°16′18″N 51°30′11″E
- Country: Qatar
- Municipality: Doha
- Zone: Zone 39
- District no.: 40

Area
  - Total: 0.6 km^{2} (0.23 sq mi)

Fereej Al Nasr (Arabic: فريج النصر, romanized: Farīq an Naşr; also referred to simply as Al Nasr) is a district in Qatar, located in the municipality of Doha.

Al Nasr Street, one of the main roads that runs through the district, is locally known for its high density of commercial establishments. Among its occupants are Doha Clinic Hospital which is the first private hospital in Qatar as well as barber shops, tailors, electronics shops, and stationery supplies shops. Several international restaurants are found on the street.

== Etymology ==
The first constituent of the district's name, Fereej, translates to "neighborhood" in English. The second part, Al Nasr, is the name of the first tribe to settle this region.

== Healthcare ==
The following healthcare facilities are located in Fereej Al Nasr:

Facility	Specialty	Website
Doha Clinic Hospital	Multispecialty	Official website
Al Tai Medical Center	Multispecialty	Official website
Gulf Laboratory & Radiology	Diagnostics	Official website
