= City Center Doha Mall =

- سيتي سنتر الدوحة مول
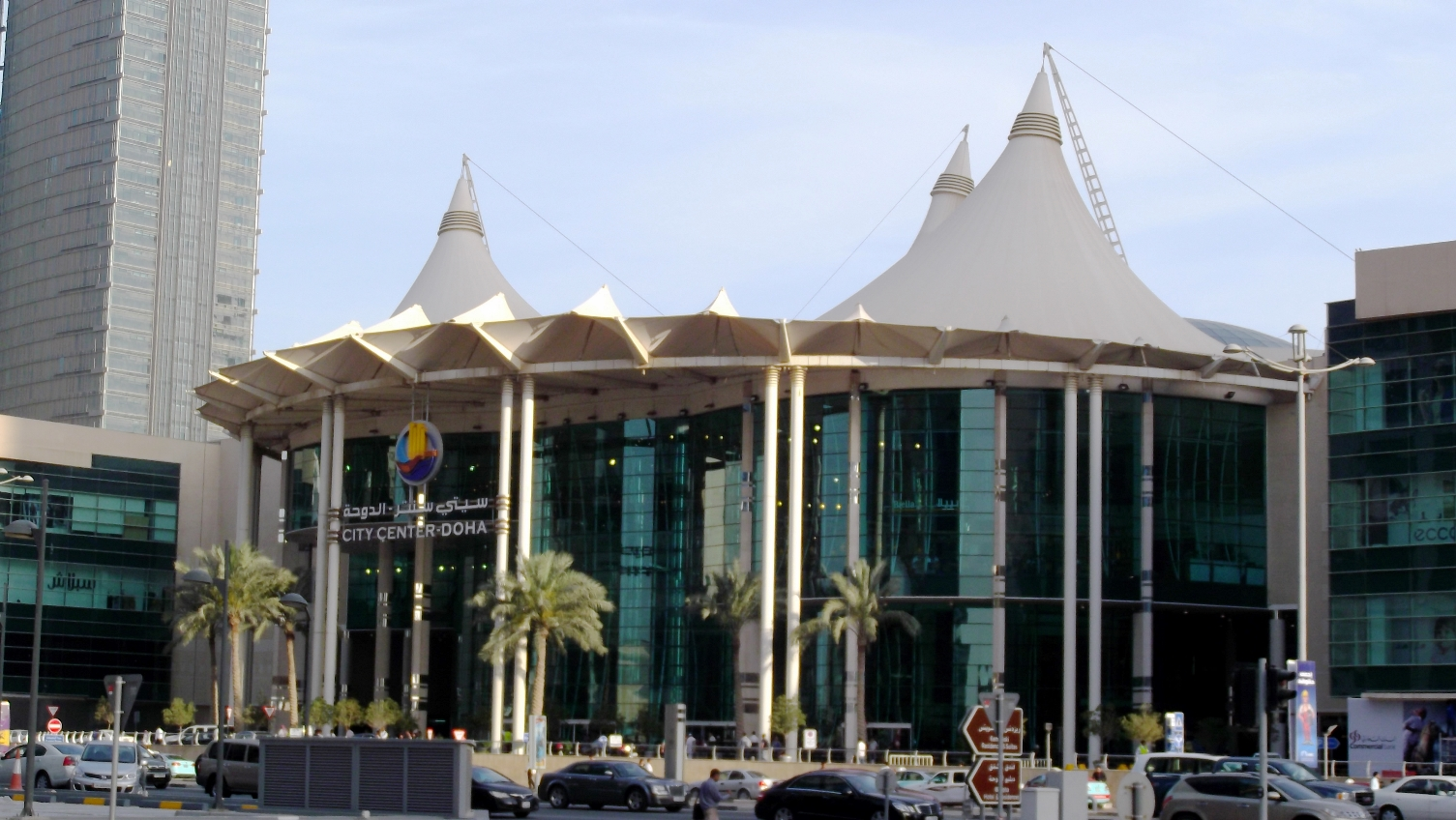
- Location: Doha, Qatar
- Opened: 2001
- Website: citycenterdoha.com

City Center Doha Mall is a shopping mall located in the Qatari capital, Doha. It was opened in 2001. It is located in the West Bay area and is one of the largest malls in Qatar.

As of 2021, there are around 260 stores in Doha City Centre.

== Transport links ==
The City Center Mall is located close to the metro station DECC of the Red Line and the Metrolink bus stop of the line M105 (public bus) as well as the hop-on, hop-off busses. There is also an underground car park and bicycle parking facialities (next to the metro station's entries).

== Barrier free accessablitiy ==
The City Center Mall has elevators and escalators as well as stepless access. Wheelchairs can be borrowed at the rection as well. There is no Braille or tactile paving for the blind yet.

== Stores ==
- Adidas
- H&M
- Letoile
- Levi's
- iSpace
- Wok Wok

== See also ==
- Doha Festival City
- Mall of Qatar
