= Lekhwair (Doha) =

Lekhwair لخوير
- District
- Location within Doha Location within Qatar
- Coordinates: 25.3136°N 51.5111°E
- Country: Qatar
- Municipality: Doha

Lekhwair (Arabic: لخوير, romanized: Likhwaīr; also spelled as Al Khuwair) is a district in Qatar, located in the municipality of Doha. It is close to the West Bay district.

The Khalifa International Tennis and Squash Complex is situated in Lekhwair.

== Gallery ==
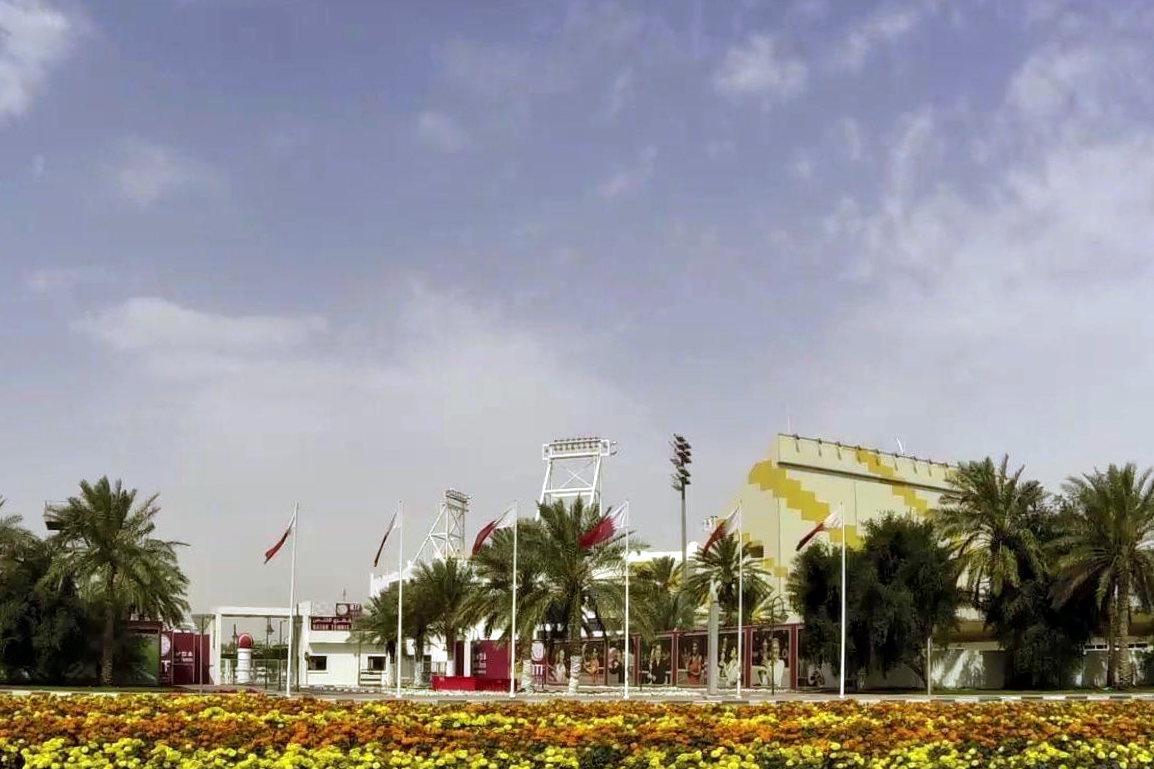
Khalifa International Tennis and Squash Complex in Lekhwair.

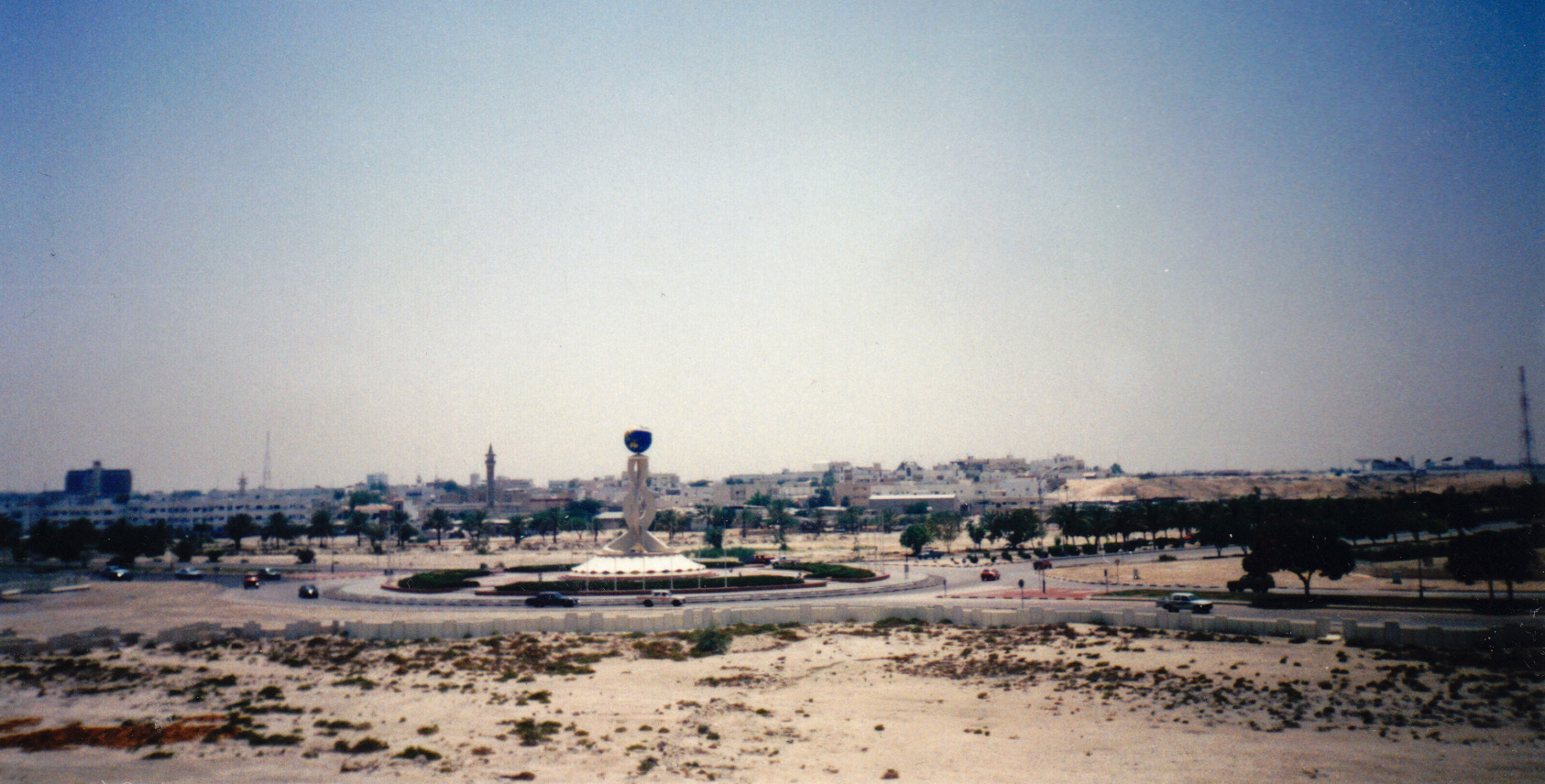
Ludaihy Roundabout in Lekhwair in 1995, later to become known as Oryx Roundabout before being replaced with Lekhwair Intersection in August 2013.

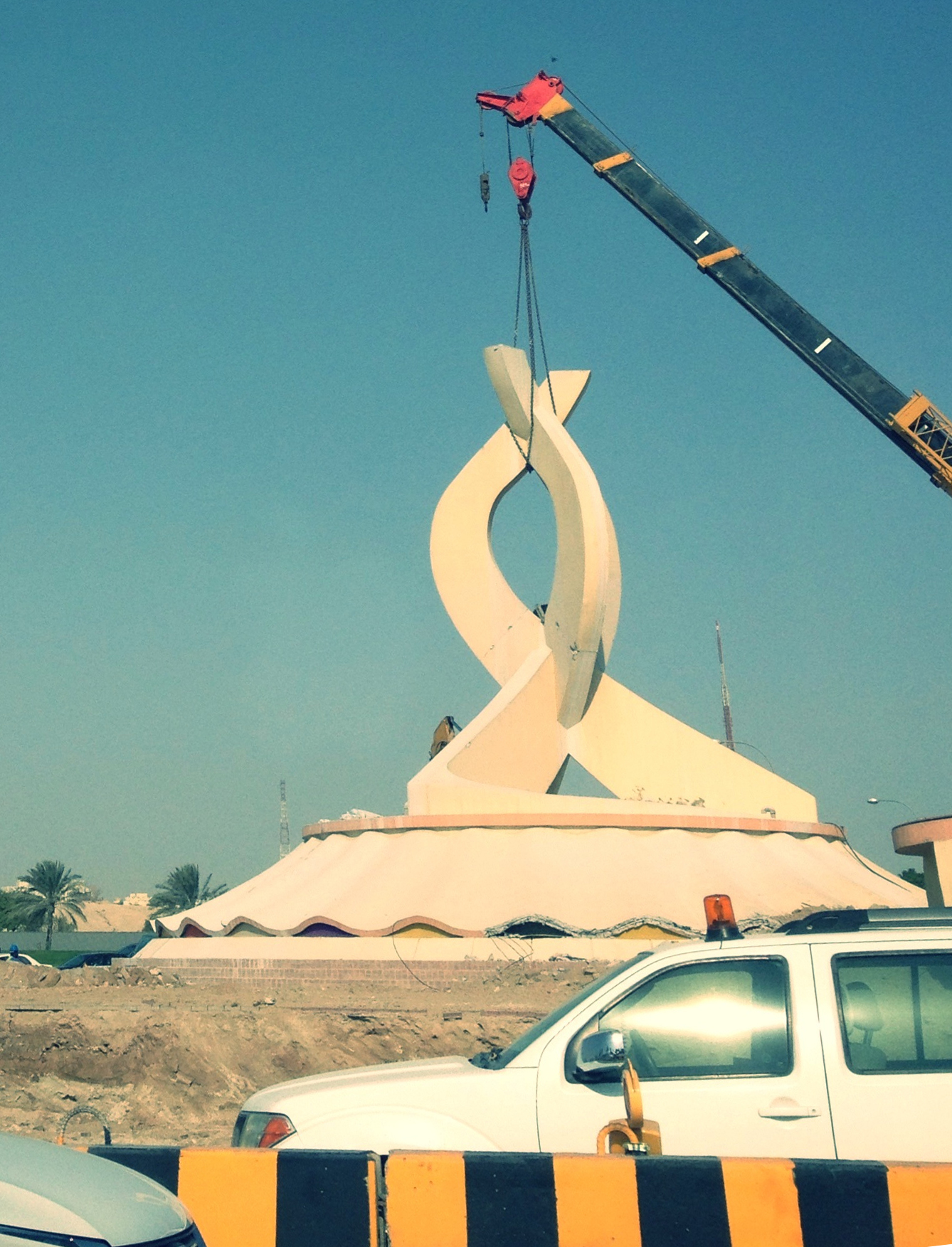
Oryx Roundabout in the process of being dismantled in 2013.
