= Ras Abu Aboud =

Ras Abu Aboud راس بو عبود
- District
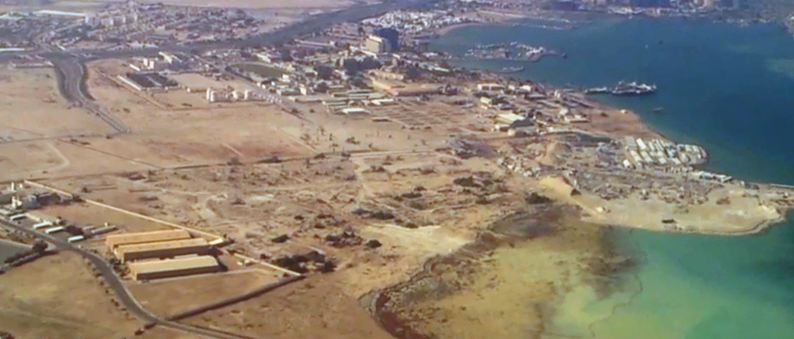
- Aerial view of Ras Abu Aboud in 2015

- Location within Doha Location within Qatar
- Coordinates: 25.2897°N 51.5789°E
- Country: Qatar
- Municipality: Doha
- Zone: Zone 28
- District no.: 26

Area
  - Total: 3.2 km^{2} (1.2 sq mi)

Population (2010)
  - Total: 0
  - Density: 0.0/km^{2} (0.0/sq mi)

Ras Abu Aboud (Arabic: راس بو عبود, romanized: Ra's Abū 'Abbūd) is a Qatari district in the municipality of Doha. It is an industrial district containing power and desalination plants. It accommodates one of Qatar's three major power stations which supply electricity to the whole country.

== Etymology ==
In Arabic, ras translates to "head", and is used to refer to a coastal promontory. The second constituent, Aboud, comes from the name of a man who lived in the area.

== History ==
In the 1820s, George Barnes Brucks carried out the first British survey of the Persian Gulf. He recorded the following notes about Ras Abu Aboud, which he referred to as Ras Boo Aboot:

"Ras Boo Aboot, the SE. boundary of Al Bidder Harbour, is in lat. 25° 17' N., long. 51° 35' E. The reef that forms the southern side of the entrance to Al Bidder Harbour runs out two miles from this point, and continues along shore, running off about one mile, until it joins Fasht al Anief."

The British Hydrographic Office conducted a survey of the Persian Gulf in 1890 and wrote the following description of Ras Abu Aboud:

"Ras Bu Abut is a low point in the bay, 2 1/2 miles W.N.W. from the last [Ras Abul Mashut]. Off it there is little reef, but between it and Abul Mushlit a great reef projects for 2 miles to the northward, forming the south side of the entrance to the harbour; it is chiefly rocky, and has only a few feet on it at low water. The entrance to the harbour, north of this reef, is only one-third of a mile broad, for half a mile of its length, with 3 1/2 and 4 1/2 fathoms in it. The northern reef projects to south-eastward 1 1/2 miles, from a low sandy island with grass on it, called Jezirat as Sufla [Al Safliya Island]. This reef is chiefly of sand, and, outside the entrance, trends to north-east and northward, extending for some miles. Sufla Island is narrow, and about a mile long East and West; it bears N. by E. 3 miles from Ras Bu Abut. Within the entrance the harbour opens out into a basin about 3 miles in extent, with soundings from 3 to 5 fathoms, quite regular, over a bottom of white mud or clay."

The first scouting activities in Qatar began in 1953, initially at Abdullah Bin Thani School. However, the first official scout camp was held in Ras Abu Aboud. This location was selected due to its seclusion and suitability for outdoor training. The early scouts, most of whom were students, participated in training and camping activities at the site, marking the beginning of organized scouting in the country.

== Landmarks ==
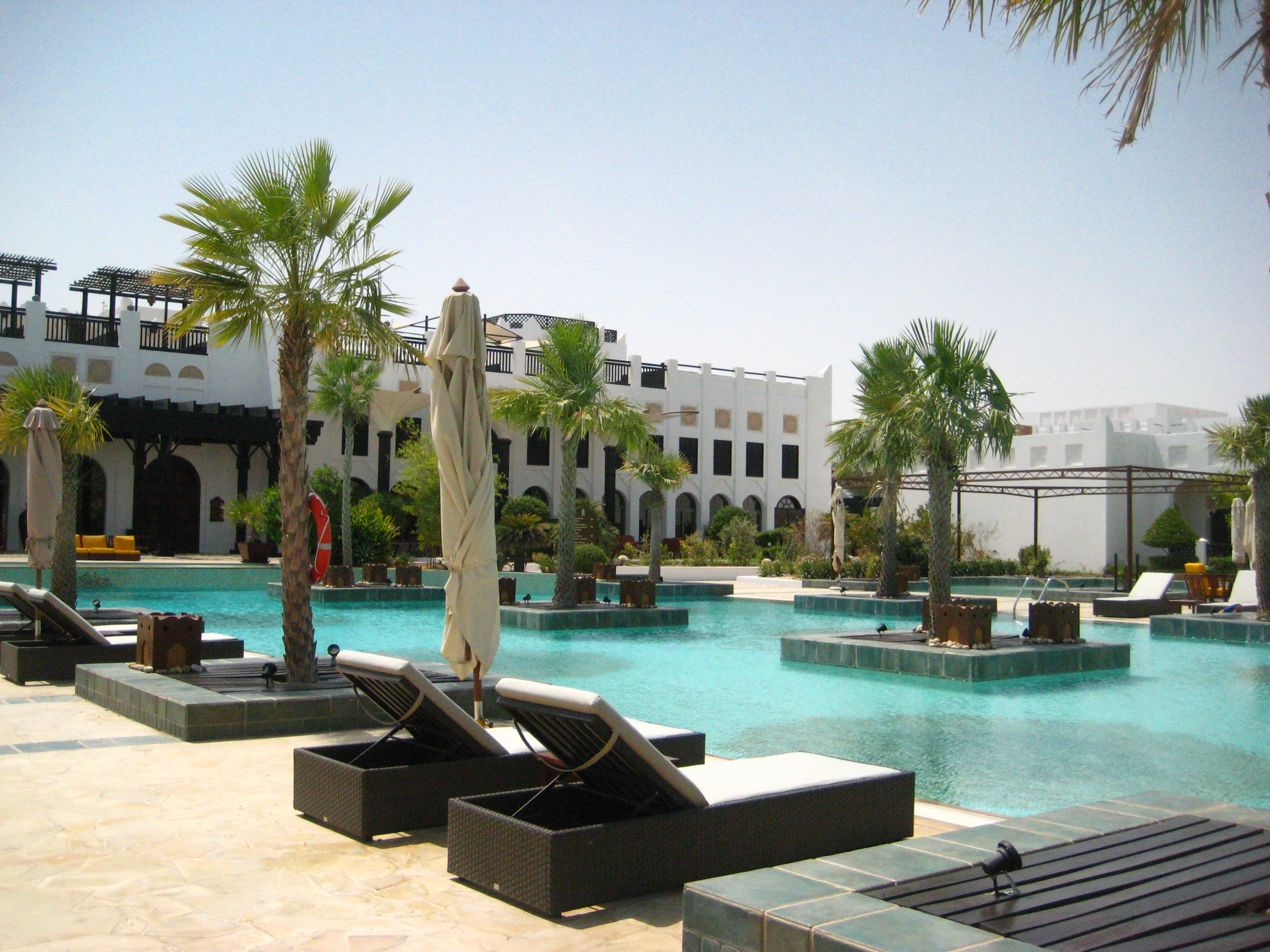
Sharq Village and Spa in Ras Abu Aboud.

- Ras Abu Aboud Civil Defense
- Qatar Table Tennis Association
- Doha Sailing Club on Ras Abu Aboud Street
- Sharq Village and Spa on Ras Abu Aboud Street
- Marriott Hotel on Ras Abu Aboud Street
- Housing Section, Human Resources Department of the Ministry of Municipality and Environment on Tabouk Street

== Industrial infrastructure ==
=== Power station ===
Inaugurated in 1963, the Ras Abu Aboud power station was built at a cost of QR 1 billion. It had a capacity of 60 MW in 1970, and an expansion in 1972 increased this to 90 MW. After several more expansions, by 1976 its capacity had been increased to 102.5 MW.

By 1984 its capacity was more than doubled to 210 MW.

=== Desalination plant ===
In 1983, over QR 50 million was invested in the desalination plant and had a production of 11.5 million gallons per day.

=== QatarEnergy ===
QatarEnergy handles its Doha operations out of Ras Abu Aboud. The following facilities of QatarEnergy are based in Ras Abu Aboud:

- Training Center
- Environmental Affairs Department on Ras Abu Aboud Street
- Information Technology Department Ras Abu Aboud Street
- Technical Records Center, Oil and Gas Ventures Services Department on Ras Abu Aboud Street
- Doha Distribution Center on Ras Abu Aboud Street
- Environmental Affairs Department on Ras Abu Aboud Street

== Transport ==
Ras Bu Aboud station, located approximately 800 metres (2,600 ft) from Stadium 974, is part of the Doha Metro's Gold Line.

== Sports ==
View of Stadium 974

A temporary football stadium known as Stadium 974 was constructed in Ras Abu Aboud to host matches during the 2022 FIFA World Cup. The stadium carries a modular design and incorporates recycled shipping containers; it is designed to be disassembled following the conclusion of the tournament.

== Demographics ==
Year	Population
1986	2,338
1997	1,969
2004	770
2010	0
