= Rumeilah (Doha) =

Rumeilah اَلرُّمَيْلَة
- District
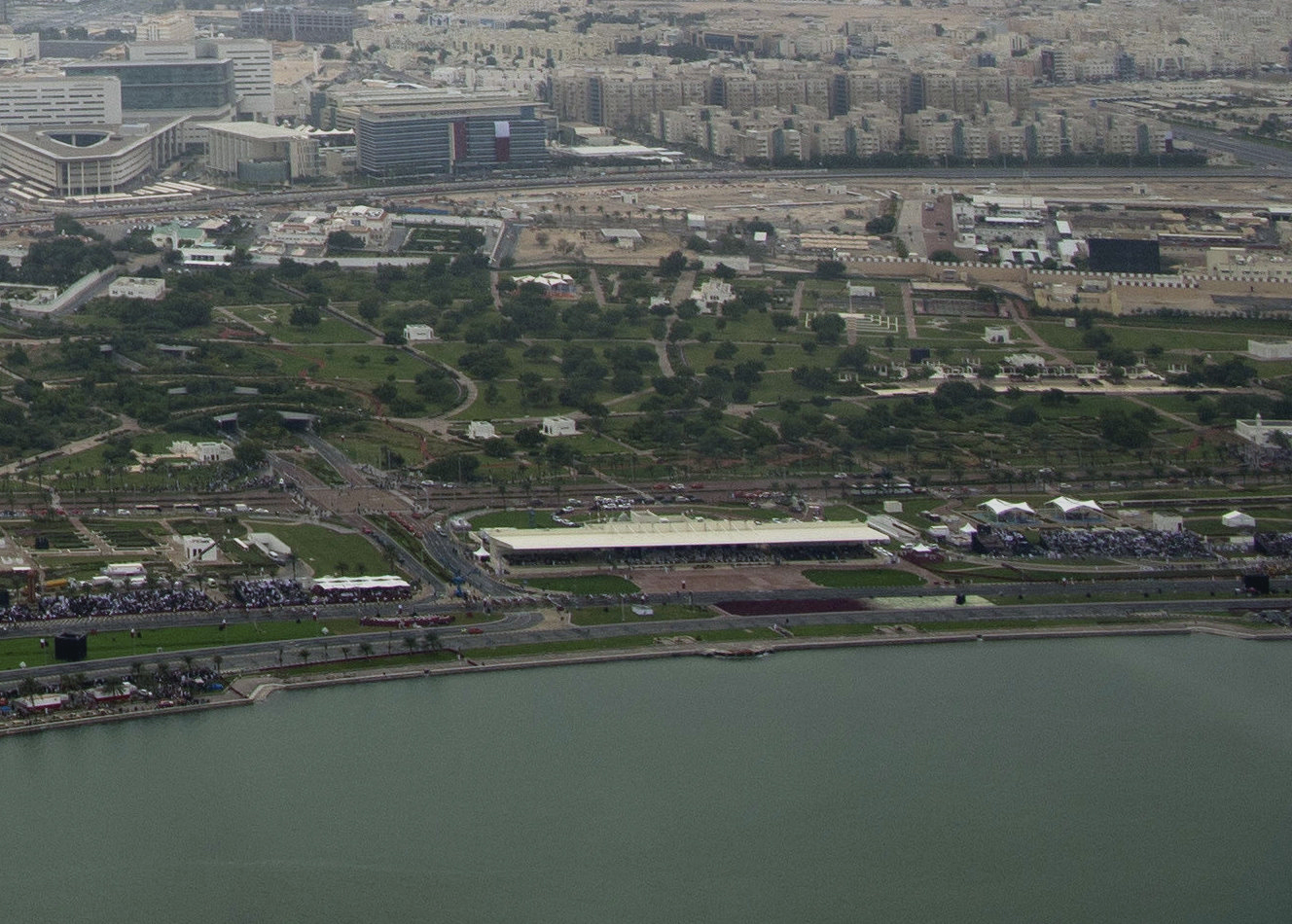
- Aerial view of Rumeilah

- Location within Doha Location within Qatar
- Coordinates: 25°17′N 51°32′E
- Country: Qatar
- Municipality: Doha
- Zone: Zone 11, Zone 21
- District no.: 11

Area
  - Total: 1.7 km^{2} (0.66 sq mi)

Population (2010)
  - Total: 1,595
  - Density: 940/km^{2} (2,400/sq mi)

Rumeilah (Arabic: اَلرُّمَيْلَة, romanized: Ar Rumaylah; also spelled Rumaila) is a neighborhood of Doha, Qatar. It is divided into an eastern and western section. Zone 11, the eastern section, hosts roughly half of Al Bidda Park while Zone 21 contains most of Hamad Medical Corporation's facilities. Hamad Medical City was constructed over 227,000 square meters in Rumeilah at a cost of $659 million. Portions of Hamad Medical City form its own district to the west.

== Etymology ==
Rumeilah derives its name from the Arabic word raml, which translates to "sand". It earned this name due its sandy soils.

== Landmarks ==
- HMC Heart Hospital.
- HMC Rumeilah Hospital.
- HMC Al Amal Hospital on Al Istiqlal Street.
- HMC Dental and Oral Surgery Centre on Al Razi Street.
- Hamad International Medical Training Center.
- HMC Institute of Nursing.
- Ministry of Public Health on Al Istiqlal Street.

=== Al Bidda Park ===
Al Bidda Park (formerly known as Rumaila Park) is partially located in Rumeilah and is split into two parts by Rumeilah Street, with the eastern side being in Al Bidda.

== Transport ==
Mowasalat is the official transport company in Qatar and serves the community through its operation of public bus routes. Rumeilah is served by two bus lines, both of which depart from Al Ghanim Bus Station. Route 56 has stops at Rumeilah Hospital and Madinat Khalifa South and a terminus at New Al Gharrafa, running at frequency of every 30 minutes on all days of the week. Route 156 also has stops at Rumeilah Hospital and Madinat Khalifa South but has a terminus at Al Kharaitiyat Bus Station, and likewise runs at a frequency of every 30 minutes on all days of the week.

Major roads that run through the district are Al Rumeila Street, Mohammed Bin Thani Street, Onaiza Street, Al Bidda Street, Al Rayyan Road, Ahmed Bin Ali Street, and Corniche Street.

== Demographics ==
As of the 2010 census, the district comprised 856 housing units and 58 establishments. There were 1,595 people living in the district, of which 28% were male and 72% were female. Out of the 679 inhabitants, 90% were 20 years of age or older and 10% were under the age of 20. The literacy rate stood at 99%.

Employed persons made up 84% of the total population. Females accounted for 74% of the working population, while males accounted for 26% of the working population.

| Year | Population |
|---|---|
| 1986 | 5,866 |
| 1997 | 4,319 |
| 2004 | 4,056 |
| 2010 | 1,595 |
