= Onaiza =

Onaiza عنيزة
- District
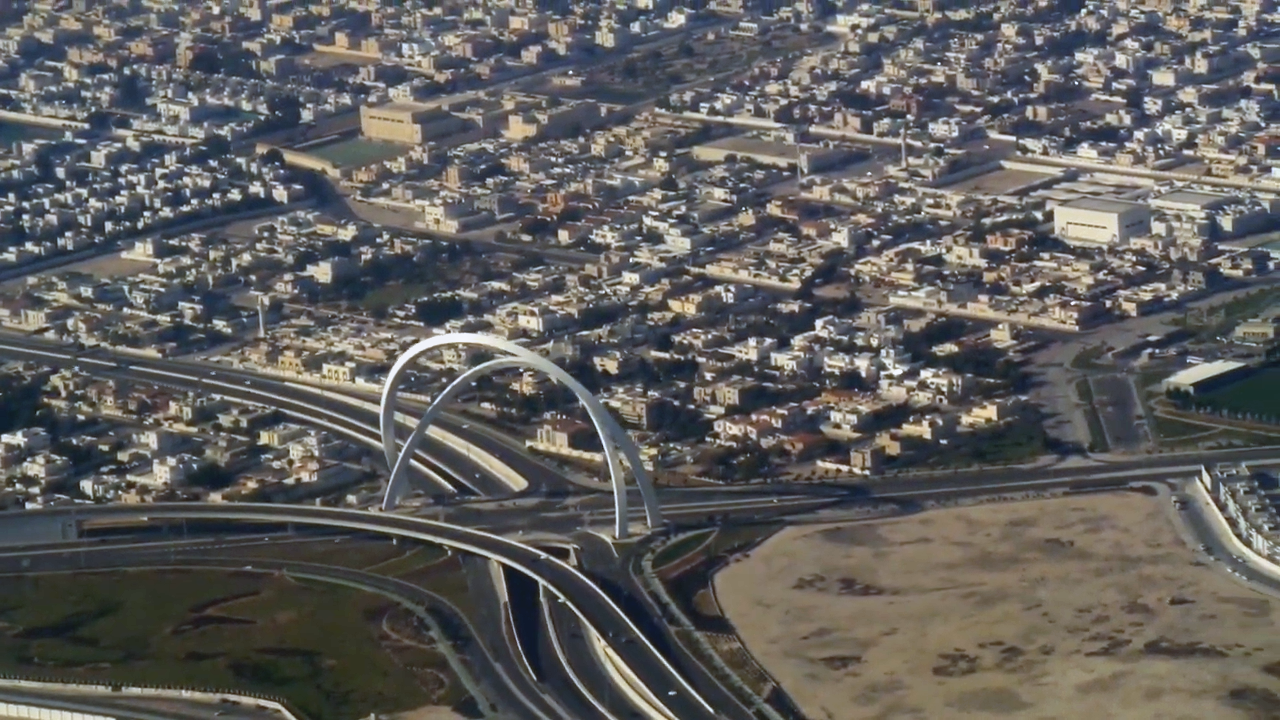
- Al Wahda Arches at the beginning of the Lusail Expressway in Onaiza

- Location within Doha Location within Qatar
- Coordinates: 25°19′22″N 51°31′15″E
- Country: Qatar
- Municipality: Doha
- Zone: Zone 63, Zone 65, Zone 66
- District no.: 103

Area
  - Total: 6.3 km^{2} (2.4 sq mi)

Onaiza (Arabic: عنيزة, romanized: ‘Unayzah) is a north-eastern district of Doha, Qatar. It is located between Al Dafna, Qatar's emerging central business district, and Lusail, a development north of Doha which is set to hold 200,000 residents in the near future.

== History ==
Onaiza housed Doha's first airport in the 20th century. It had a one-room terminal and a dirt landing strip.

The district has mostly developed in the late 1990s and early 2000s as a result of its proximity to Doha's new business district and its relative distance from the more congested centre of the city. Government officials have focused their efforts on developing Onaiza as northern Doha's new foreign embassy district. The Embassy of India, Doha, which represents Qatar's largest nationality group, is based in this neighborhood.

== Landmarks ==
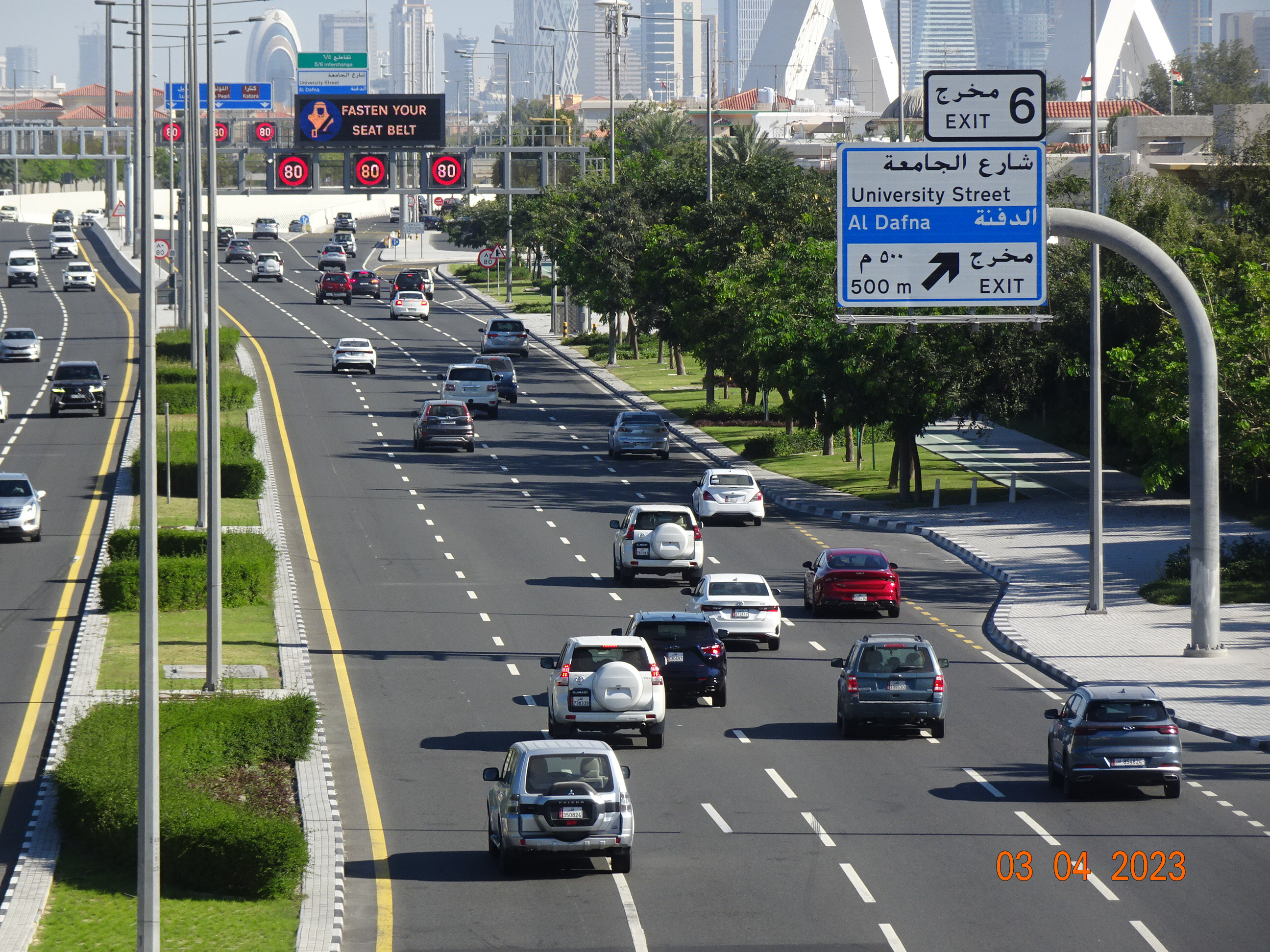
View of Onaiza Street

- Doha Radio Station on Al Khulaifat Street.
- New Onaiza Park on Al Intisar Street.
- Onaiza Park on Al Rafiei Street.
- Qatar Fencing Federation on Al Markhiya Street.

== Transport ==
Major roads that run through the district are Al Bidda Street, Onaiza Street, Al Markhiya Street, Omar Al Mukhtar Street, and University Street.

== Embassies ==
The following embassies are located in Onaiza:

- (South Korea) Embassy of the Republic of Korea in Doha
- Embassy of the Republic of Benin in Doha
- Embassy of the Republic of Romania in Doha
- Embassy of the Republic of Senegal in Doha
- (North Macedonia) Embassy of the Republic of Macedonia in Doha
- Embassy of the State of Palestine in Doha
- Embassy of the Republic of Cyprus in Doha
- Embassy of the Republic of Yemen in Doha
- Embassy of Mexico in Doha
- Embassy of India in Doha
- Embassy of Japan in Doha
- (Georgia (country)) Embassy of the Republic of Georgia in Doha
- (Libya) Embassy of the Libyan Arab Republic in Doha
- Embassy of the Kingdom of Thailand in Doha
- Embassy of the Republic of Liberia in Doha
- Embassy of the Republic of Tunisia in Doha
- Embassy of the United Kingdom in Doha
- Embassy of the People's Democratic Republic of Algeria in Doha
- Embassy of the Republic of Lebanon in Doha
- Embassy of the Republic of Turkey in Doha
- Embassy of the Sultanate of Oman in Doha
- Embassy of the Arab Republic of Egypt in Doha
- Embassy of the Republic of Djibouti in Doha
- (Eswatini) Embassy of the Kingdom of Swaziland in Doha
- Embassy of the Republic of Moldova in Doha
- Embassy of the Republic of Kenya in Doha
- Embassy of the Republic of Ecuador in Doha
- Embassy of the Republic of Bulgaria in Doha

== Education ==
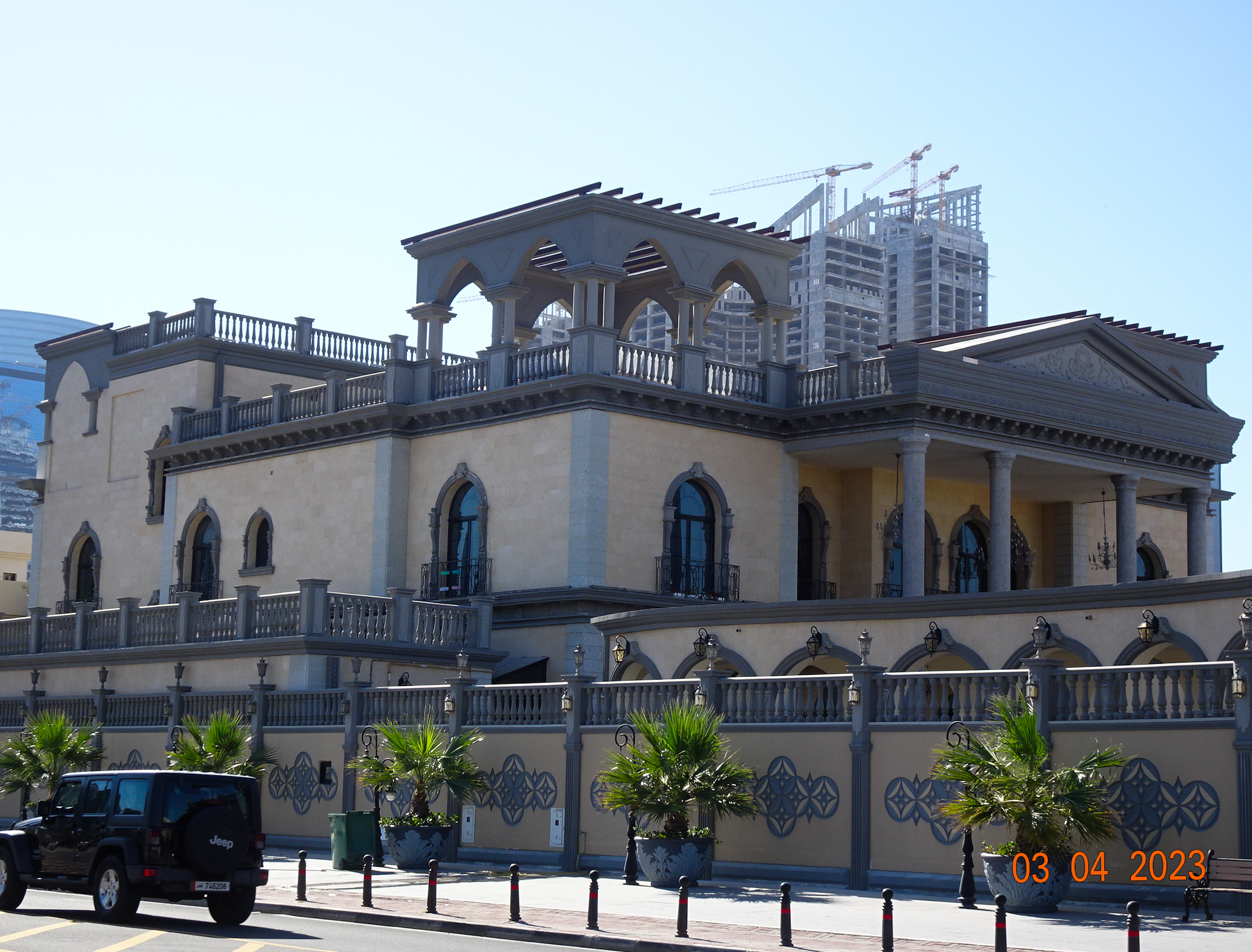
Lycée Bonaparte building in Onaiza

The following schools are located in Onaiza:

Name of School	Curriculum	Grade	Genders	Official Website	Ref
Lycée Bonaparte	International	Kindergarten – Secondary	Both	Official website	
The Lebanese School	International	Kindergarten – Secondary	Both	N/A	
Petits Pas Nursery	International	Pre-school	Both	Official website	
Mary Poppins Nursery	International	Pre-school	Both	N/A	
Loydence Academy Nursery	International	Pre-school	Both	Official website	
