= Doha (municipality) =

Municipality in Qatar

Doha الدوحة Doha
- Municipality
- Location of the municipality of Doha within Qatar
- Coordinates: 25°17′12″N 51°32′0″E
- Country: Qatar
- Capital: Doha
- Zones: 59

Government
  - Director: Jamal Matar Al-Nuaimi

Area
  - Total: 234 km^{2} (90 sq mi)

Population (2020)
  - Total: 1,186,023
  - Density: 5,070/km^{2} (13,100/sq mi)
- Time zone: UTC+3 (AST)

Doha (Arabic: الدوحة, ad-Dawḥa or ad-Dōḥa, Arabic pronunciation: [addawħa]) is one of the eight municipalities of Qatar. It is the most populous municipality in the country, with a population of 1,186,023 in 2020, and contains Qatar's capital city, Doha.

== Etymology ==
According to the Ministry of Municipality and Environment, the name "Doha" originated from the Arabic term "dohat", which means "roundness". This name is derived from the rounded bays surrounding the area's coastline.

== History ==
Doha first appeared in the records in around the 1820s. It initially appeared near the already established settlement of Al Bidda. The settlement of Doha later engulfed Al Bidda.

In 1950, prior to the official establishment of Doha Municipality, Phillip L. Plant, British adviser to the emir, initiated the first municipal projects in Qatar. Starting with remodeling the old complex of the Old Amiri Palace, Plant then oversaw the construction of a seaside road about a half-mile in length which opened up and made accessible the half dozen jetties along Doha's most built-up section. In 1963, the municipality was formally established.

In 1981, an extensive survey of plants in Doha revealed that the total cultivated area was approximately 265,650 square meters. The number of standing trees that year was 16,909, and there were 26,560 flowering shrubs. The green area planted in 1981 covered about 209,349 square meters, and at least 89 agricultural projects were implemented.

According to municipal records, the total number of landscaped roundabouts at the end of 1984 was 40. Overall, 83,000 square meters of these roundabouts comprised landscaped areas, with 177 trees and over 28,000 shrubs.

Municipal authorities began an extensive campaign to create names for streets throughout Doha in the 1980s. In 1985, they began to develop signage for every street. An alphabetical deed system for every building parcel in Doha was developed, with the Real Estate Registration and Documentation Department photographing and copying to microfilm the deeds to buildings. Also in 1985, the Planning Department of Doha Municipality initiated a campaign to demolish old and abandoned buildings in downtown Doha and to redevelop its ring roads.

The government spent a significant amount of money on buying back land from tribal landowners in the city. Between 1975 and 1985, approximately QAR 4 billion was spent on the process, resulting in an increase of 3.1 square kilometers in the developed area of downtown Doha. From 1981 to 1985, Doha Municipality invested QAR 371 million into large-scale developments in the city and QAR 136 million into developing and maintaining parks and landscaping.

By 1986, Doha's total cultivated land area had increased to 1,002,364 square meters, spread across 180 agricultural projects throughout the city. The number of trees planted in the city had risen to 38,380, and the number of shrubs and flowering plants reached approximately 575,774. The green areas covered 770,045 square meters, with an additional 40,984 square meters of sand and gravel surfaces, considered an integral part of agricultural works, along with 2,201 square meters of rock gardens. Modern irrigation systems for landscaping, including drip irrigation systems, were installed in the mid-1980s using treated water from the wastewater treatment plant in Nuaija.

== Administration ==
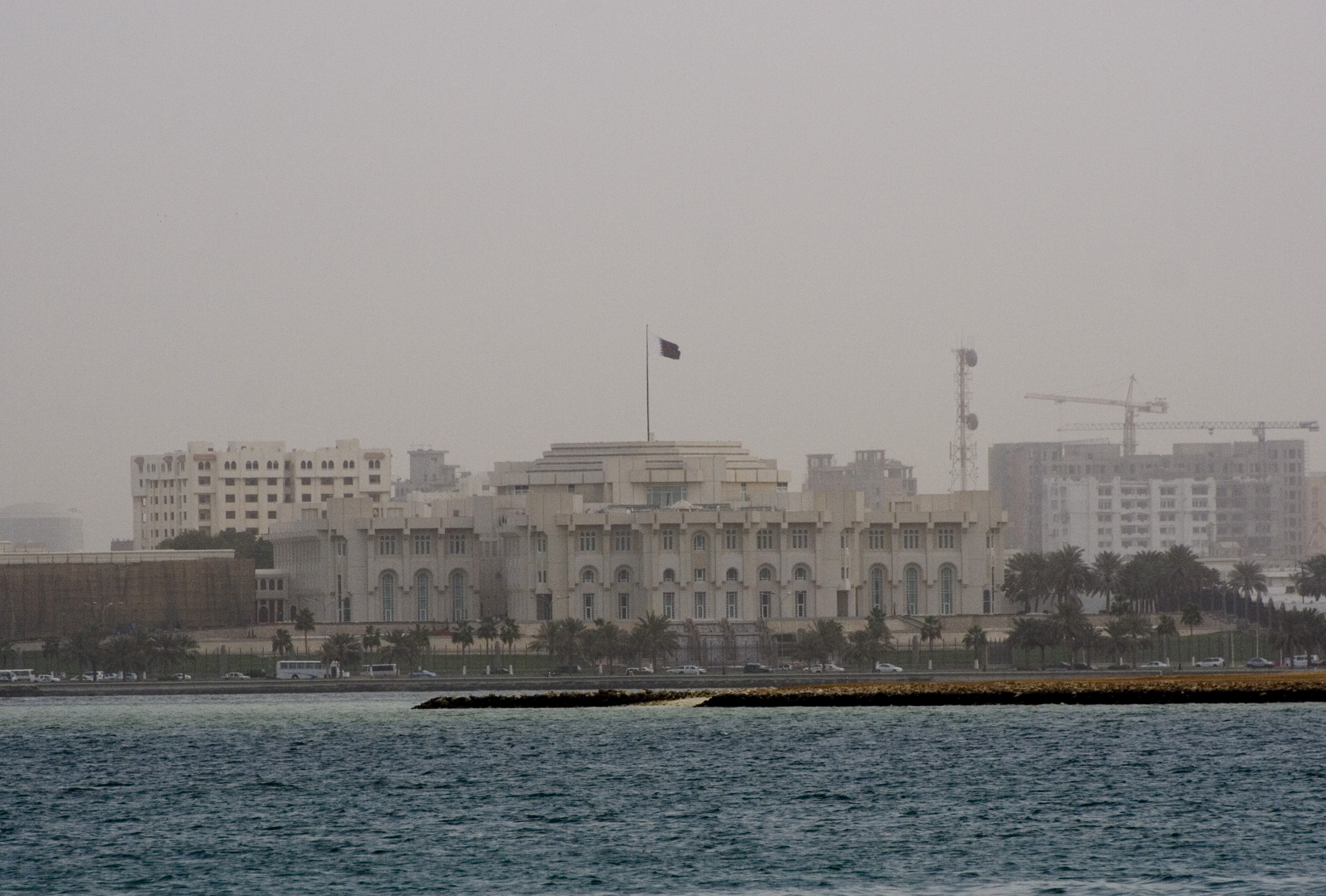
Amiri Diwan

According to the Ministry of Municipality and Urban Planning, the Municipality of Qatar became the first municipality to be established in 1963. Later that year, the name was changed to the Municipality of Doha. The country has been divided into eight municipalities since 2014. Doha is the most populated municipality among them with a population of 956,457 as of 2015.

The exclave of Doha Industrial Area and the island of Halul, 80 km (50 mi) away from Doha, fall within municipal boundaries.

Municipal headquarters were shifted from the Al Sadd area to Ras Abu Aboud in 2017.

=== District centers ===
Locations of district centers in Doha.

As part of the Qatar National Master Plan, twenty-eight centers have been designated throughout Qatar to promote sustained urban development and to better implement public transport. Centers serve as hubs for surrounding districts. The centers range from Capital City Center to District Center, with the former being the highest-level designation and vice versa.

== Geography ==
Doha municipality is in the central east region of Qatar; it is bordered by Al Wakrah municipality to the south, Al Rayyan municipality to the west, Al Daayen municipality to the north and Umm Salal municipality to the northwest.

Comprising the majority of Qatar's residential, financial and administrative centers, the Doha Metropolitan Area hosts over 80% of the country's inhabitants. The core of Doha, which is the easternmost area of the municipality, is the administrative and financial hub of the country and the municipality, with districts such as Al Dafna and West Bay being located here. Moreover, this area also accommodates critical infrastructure such as Hamad Medical City and Hamad International Airport.

Map of the municipalities of Qatar

Other areas of importance include the Industrial Area, an exclave in Al Rayyan municipality, as well as the Wholesale Market Area, which encompasses the western portion of the municipality, and unofficially includes areas of Al Rayyan.

In the northern region of Doha, developments such as the Katara Cultural Village and The Pearl Island, which is projected to house as many as 45,000 residents, can be found. The northern part of the West Bay financial district is also located here. Towards the center of the municipality is the Amiri Diwan, Souq Waqif, the Doha Corniche and the historic quarters.

Most of the low-to-medium density housing projects are found in the western sector, near the Wholesale Market Area. Residential areas in western Doha include Al Sadd, Abu Hamour and Al Gharafa, the latter two of which are located in Al Rayyan but officially constitute part of Metropolitan Doha.

According to the Ministry of Municipality and Environment, the municipality accommodates five rawdas, one wadi, three plains, seven hills, two sabkhas, four capes, and two bays. Four islands are found off its shores, not including The Pearl Island.

== Infrastructure ==
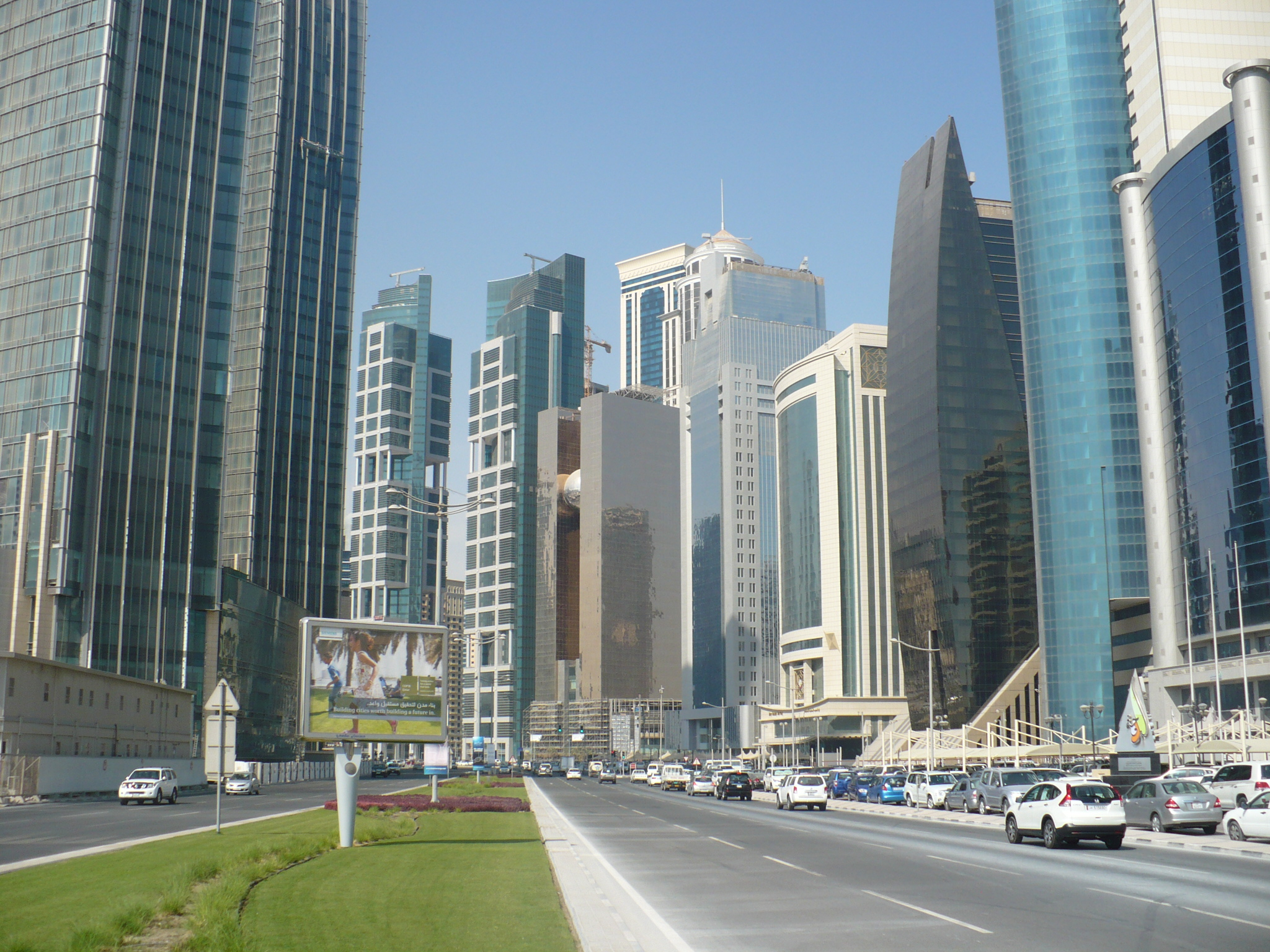
Skyscrapers in Doha's Al Dafna district

=== Education ===
As the most populous municipality, Doha contains the highest density of schools in the country. Most of the municipality's schools are near the core of Doha, i.e. the central eastern portion. There is a reported shortage of schools in the Al Sadd district, as well as the northernmost and southernmost sectors.

=== Healthcare ===
A major healthcare project known as Hamad Medical City was launched in 2003 near the Rumeilah district. Three hospitals and a research center were planned to be hosted within this 227,000 square meters (56 acres) complex at a cost of over QR 2.1 billion. In December 2017, Hamad Medical City was officially opened in a ceremony attended by the Emir of Qatar, Tamim bin Hamad Al Thani.

=== Transport ===
The Doha Metro connects the core of Doha with its metropolitan hubs. At the center of the Doha Metro system is Msheireb Station, where there are three alignments, with an additional line being constructed, and a bus rapid transit system to which to connect.
