= Bin Mahmoud station =

Metro station in Doha, Qatar

Bin Mahmoud metro station محطة مترو بن محمود

General information
- Location: Fereej Bin Mahmoud, Doha; Qatar
- Coordinates: 25.28052°N 51.51436°E
- Owner: Qatar Rail
- Operator: Doha Metro
- Platforms: 2
- Tracks: 2

Construction
- Structure type: Underground
- Parking: Yes
- Accessible: Yes

Other information
- Website: http://www.qr.com.qa/

History
- Opened: 21 November 2019

Services
Preceding station	Doha Metro	Following station
Al Sadd towards Al Aziziyah	Gold Line	Msheireb towards Ras Bu Aboud
Location

Bin Mahmoud station on the Gold Line of Qatar's Doha Metro serves the nearby Fereej Bin Mahmoud district.

== History ==
The station was opened to the public on 21 November 2019 along with ten other Gold Line stations, over six months after the opening of the network's first 13 stations on the Red Line.

== Station facilities ==
Facilities in the station include a prayer room and restrooms, as well as cafes and restaurants.

== Connections ==
There are two metrolink, which is the Doha Metro's free feeder bus network, servicing the station:

- M302, which serves Fereej Bin Mahmoud.
- M303, which serves Rawdat Al Khail.
