= Souq Waqif station =

Metro station in Doha, Qatar

Souq Waqif metro station محطة مترو سوق واقف

General information
- Location: Souq Waqif, Doha; Qatar
- Coordinates: 25.28647°N 51.53630°E
- Owner: Qatar Rail
- Operator: Doha Metro
- Platforms: 2
- Tracks: 2

Construction
- Structure type: Underground
- Parking: No
- Accessible: Yes

Other information
- Website: http://www.qr.com.qa/

History
- Opened: 21 November 2019

Services
Preceding station	Doha Metro	Following station
Msheireb towards Al Aziziyah	Gold Line	National Museum towards Ras Bu Aboud
Location

Souq Waqif station is a station on the Doha Metro's Gold Line and serves the nearby Souq Waqif market in Doha, Qatar.

== History ==
The station was opened to the public on 21 November 2019 along with ten other Gold Line stations, over six months after the opening of the network's first 13 stations on the Red Line.

== Station facilities ==
Facilities in the station include a prayer room and restrooms, as well as travel agencies.

== Connections ==
There are no metrolinks currently servicing the station.
