= Al Waab QLM station =

Metro station in Doha, Qatar

Al Waab QLM metro station محطة مترو الوعب
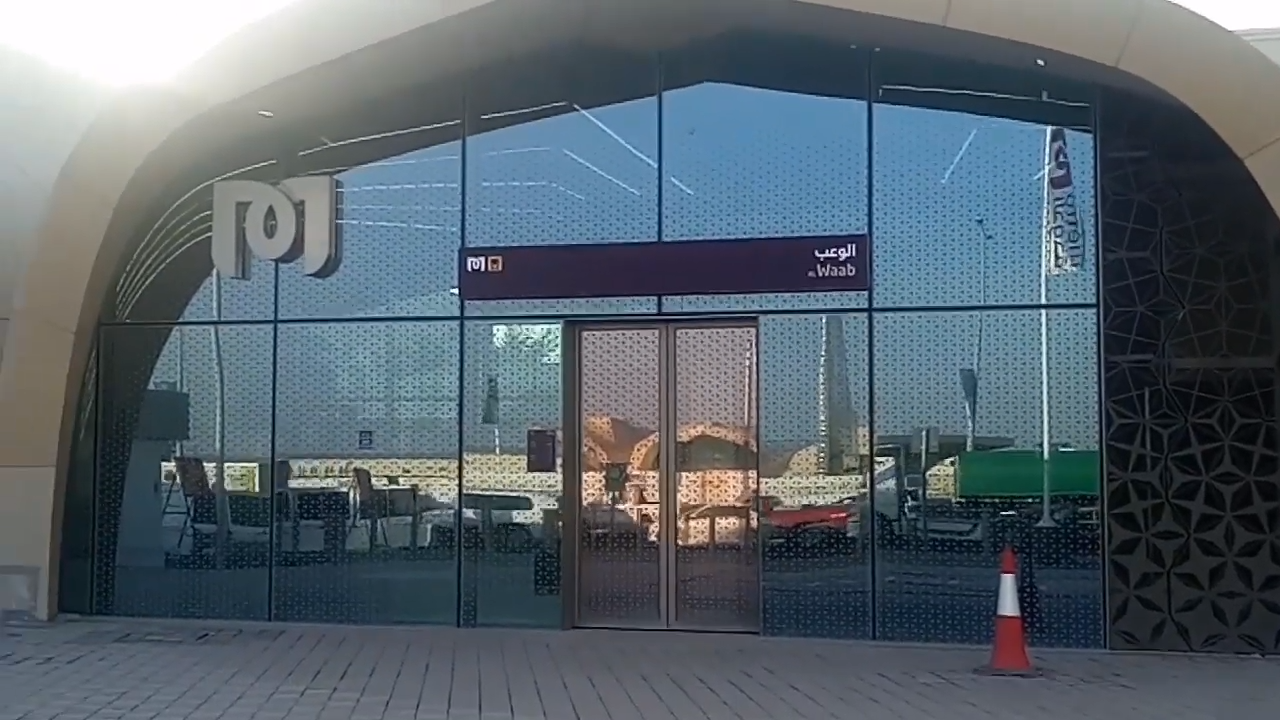

General information
- Location: Al Waab, Doha; Qatar
- Coordinates: 25.2675°N 51.4689°E
- Owner: Qatar Rail
- Operator: Doha Metro
- Platforms: 2
- Tracks: 2

Construction
- Structure type: Underground
- Parking: Yes
- Accessible: Yes

Other information
- Website: http://www.qr.com.qa/

History
- Opened: 21 November 2019

Services
Preceding station	Doha Metro	Following station
Sport City towards Al Aziziyah	Gold Line	Al Sudan towards Ras Bu Aboud
Location

Al Waab QLM station is a station on the Doha Metro's Gold Line in Doha, Qatar. The naming rights to the station are currently held by QLM Life & Medical Insurance Company.

== History ==
The station was opened to the public on 21 November 2019 along with ten other Gold Line stations, over six months after the opening of the network's first 13 stations on the Red Line.

== Station facilities ==
Facilities in the station include a prayer room and restrooms, as well as travel agencies.

== Connections ==
There are no metrolinks currently servicing the station.
