= Sport City station =

Metro station in Doha, Qatar

Sport City metro station محطة مترو بن محمود
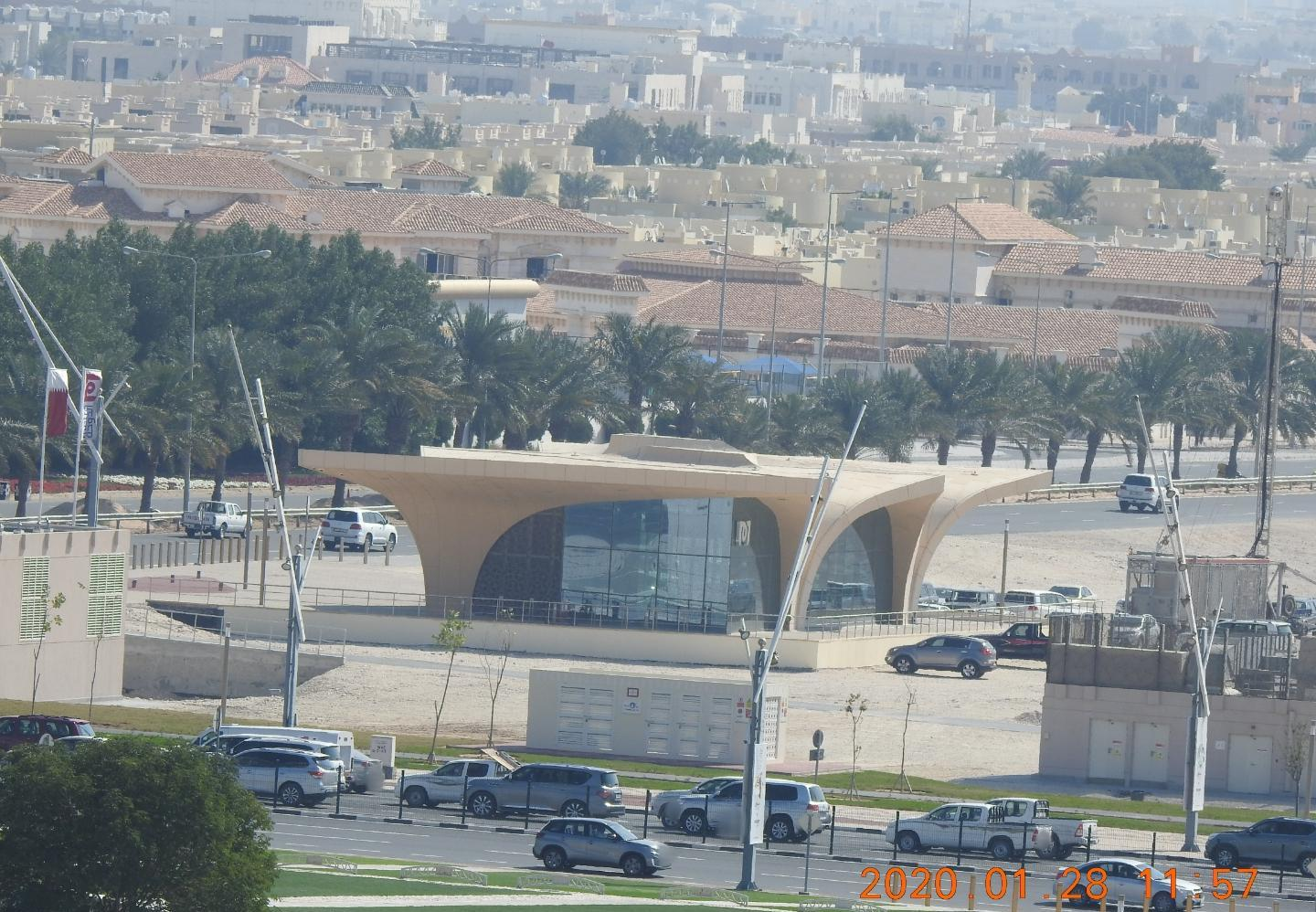

General information
- Location: Sports City, Doha; Qatar
- Coordinates: 25.2594°N 51.4525°E
- Owner: Qatar Rail
- Operator: Doha Metro
- Platforms: 2
- Tracks: 2

Construction
- Structure type: Underground
- Parking: Yes
- Accessible: Yes

Other information
- Website: http://www.qr.com.qa/

History
- Opened: 21 November 2019

Services
| Preceding station | Doha Metro | Following station |
|---|---|---|
| Al Sadd towards Al Aziziyah | Gold Line | Msheireb towards Ras Bu Aboud |
Location

Sport City station on the Gold Line of Qatar's Doha Metro serves the nearby Aspire Zone district.

== History ==
The station was opened to the public on 21 November 2019 along with ten other Gold Line stations, over six months after the opening of the network's first 13 stations on the Red Line.

== Station facilities ==
Facilities in the station include a prayer room and restrooms, as well as cafes and restaurants.

== Connections ==
There are three metrolinks, which is the Doha Metro's free feeder bus network, servicing the station:

- M311, which serves Muraikh.
- M317, which serves Abu Sidra.
- M310, which serves Abu Hamour.
