= Al Sudan station =

Metro station in Qatar

Al Sudan metro station محطة مترو السودان

General information
- Location: Fereej Al Soudan, Doha; Qatar
- Coordinates: 25.27234°N 51.48446°E
- Owner: Qatar Rail
- Operator: Doha Metro
- Platforms: 2
- Tracks: 2

Construction
- Structure type: Underground
- Parking: No
- Accessible: Yes

Other information
- Website: http://www.qr.com.qa/

History
- Opened: 21 November 2019

Services
Preceding station	Doha Metro	Following station
Al Waab towards Al Aziziyah	Gold Line	Joaan towards Ras Bu Aboud
Location

Al Sudan station is a station on the Doha Metro's Gold Line and serves the nearby Fereej Al Soudan district in Qatar. The station is also in close proximity to Jassim bin Hamad Stadium and Ali Bin Hamad al-Attiyah Arena

== History ==
The station was opened to the public on 21 November 2019 along with ten other Gold Line stations, over six months after the opening of the network's first 13 stations on the Red Line.

== Station facilities ==
Facilities at the station include a prayer room and restrooms, as well as a café.

== Connections ==
There is one metrolink, which is the Doha Metro's free feeder bus network, servicing the station:

- M306, which serves Fereej Al Soudan 55.
