= Al Sadd station =

Metro station in Doha, Qatar

Al Sadd metro station محطة مترو السد
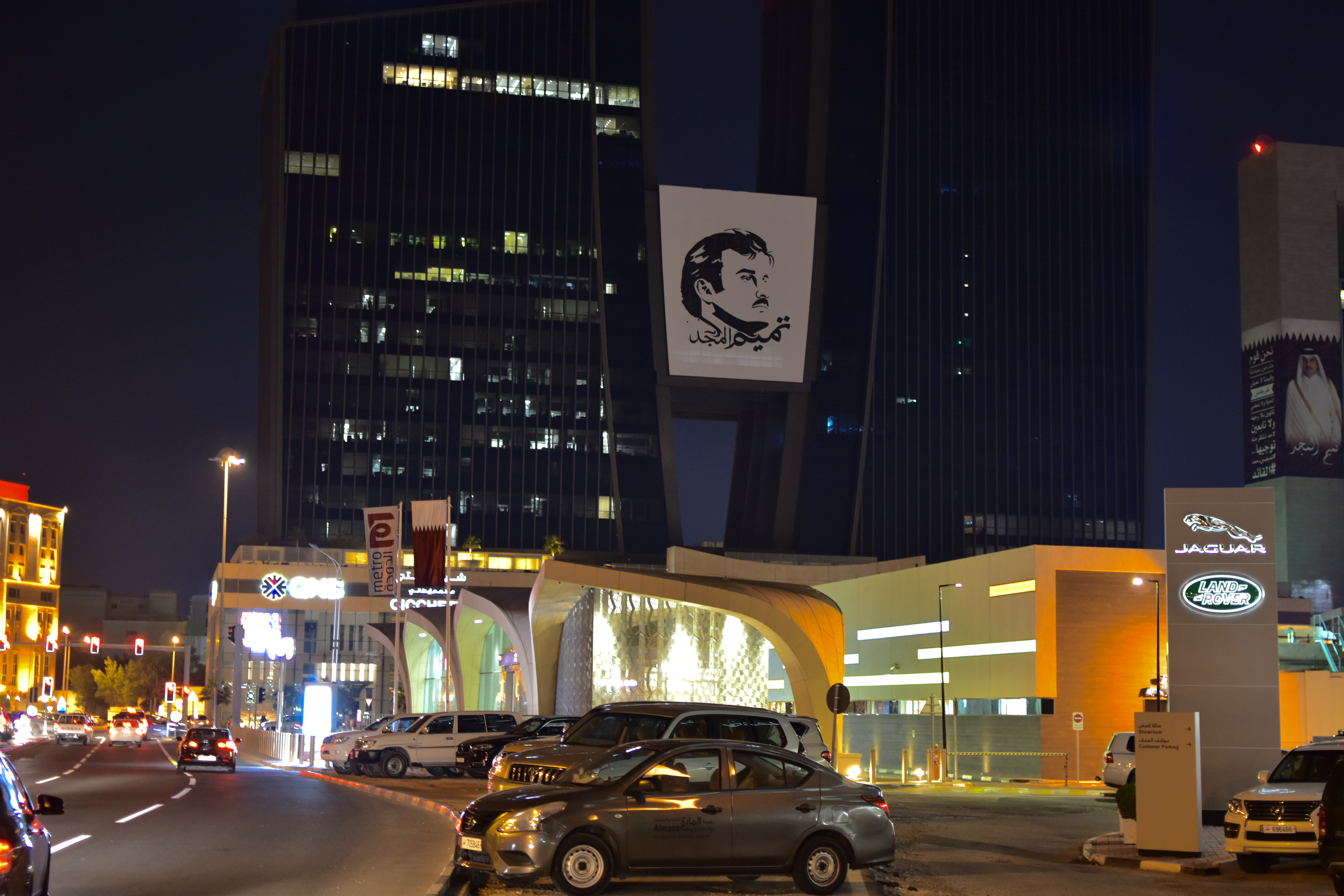

General information
- Location: Al Sadd, Doha; Qatar
- Coordinates: 25.28246°N 51.50472°E
- Owner: Qatar Rail
- Operator: Doha Metro
- Platforms: 2
- Tracks: 2

Construction
- Structure type: Underground
- Parking: Yes
- Accessible: Yes

Other information
- Website: http://www.qr.com.qa/

History
- Opened: 21 November 2019

Services
Preceding station	Doha Metro	Following station
Joaan towards Al Aziziyah	Gold Line	Bin Mahmoud towards Ras Bu Aboud
Location

Al Sadd station on the Gold Line of Qatar's Doha Metro serves the nearby Al Sadd district.

== History ==
The station was opened to the public on 21 November 2019 along with ten other Gold Line stations, over six months after the opening of the network's first 13 stations on the Red Line.

== Station facilities ==
Facilities at the station include a prayer room and restrooms, as well as a cafe.

== Connections ==
Two routes of metrolink, which is the Doha Metro's free feeder bus network, service the station:

- M210, which serves Al Sadd 38.
- M302, which serves Fereej Bin Mahmoud.
