= Msheireb Downtown Doha =

Coordinates: 25°17′9.9″N 51°31′37.6″E

Msheireb Downtown Doha مشيرب
- Planned city
- Msheireb Downtown in 2019

- Location within Qatar
- Country: Qatar
- Municipality: Doha
- Initiated: 2010
- Founder: Msheireb Properties (Qatar Foundation)

Area
  - Total: 0.31 km^{2} (0.12 sq mi)
- Website: www.msheireb.com

Msheireb Downtown Doha is a planned city in Doha, Qatar constructed as a regeneration of the historical district of Mushayrib. It is promoted as being the world's first sustainable downtown regeneration project and one of the smartest cities on earth, strategically located in the heart of Doha. Initial construction began in January 2010. Located in the downtown area of Qatar's capital city, it is set to occupy 310,000 sq m with the total cost of construction amounting to approximately $5.5 billion. It was launched in six phases by Msheireb Properties, a subsidiary of Qatar Foundation.

The project is a flagship project for Msheireb Properties, and aims to preserve the historical downtown area of Doha. Orange Business helped transform the flagship project and it also been awarded in Smart City world congress in Barcelona. This prize recognizes the most innovative and successful smart city project being implemented and developed in the fields of governance and finance.

== Project overview ==
Msheireb means 'a place to drink water' in Arabic. It is a QR20 billion (US$5.5 billion, €4.18 billion) project, covering an area of 31 hectares (77 acres) (310,000 square metres) offering a maximum floor space quantum of 764,176 square metres.

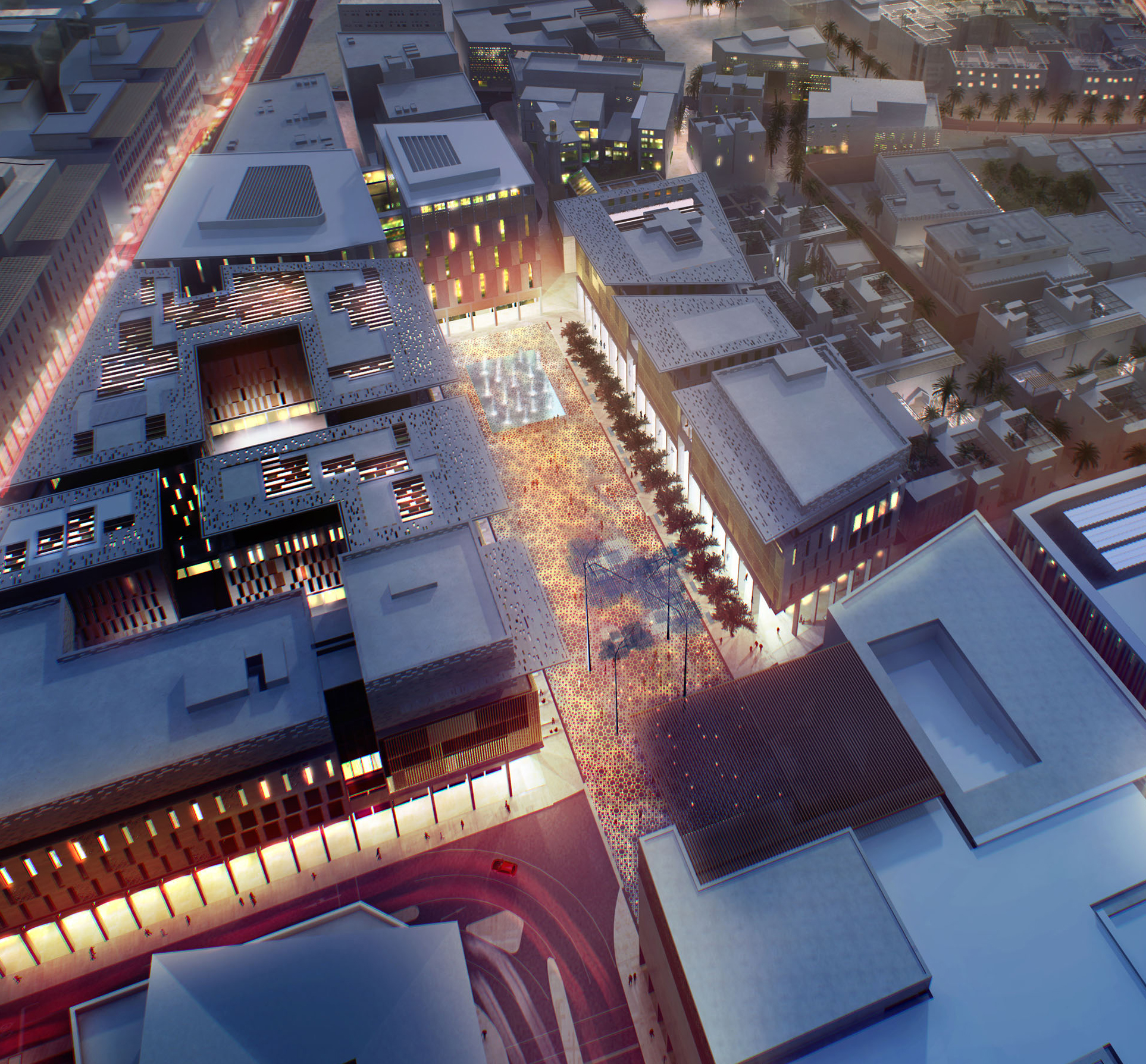
Msheireb Downtown Doha design by Michel Mossessian

== Location ==
Msheireb Downtown Doha was developed within the districts of Fereej Mohammed Bin Jasim and Mushayrib in central Doha, bordered by:

- Al Rayyan Road to the North;
- Jassim Bin Mohamed Street to the East;
- Msheireb Street to the South; and
- Al Diwan Street (part of Ring Road A) to the West.

The Msheireb project site is immediately adjacent to the Amiri Diwan, Qatar's seat of government and Ruler's palace. The site is also adjacent to the redeveloped Souk Waqif, a successful mixed-use scheme based on a traditional Qatari souk and the historical Al Koot Fort.

== Master plan ==
The master plan comprises six distinct phases. The first phase, referred to as the 'Diwan Amiri Quarter', currently under construction, features a combination of three major government buildings including the National Archive, along with heritage sites, a museum and an Eid Prayer Ground.

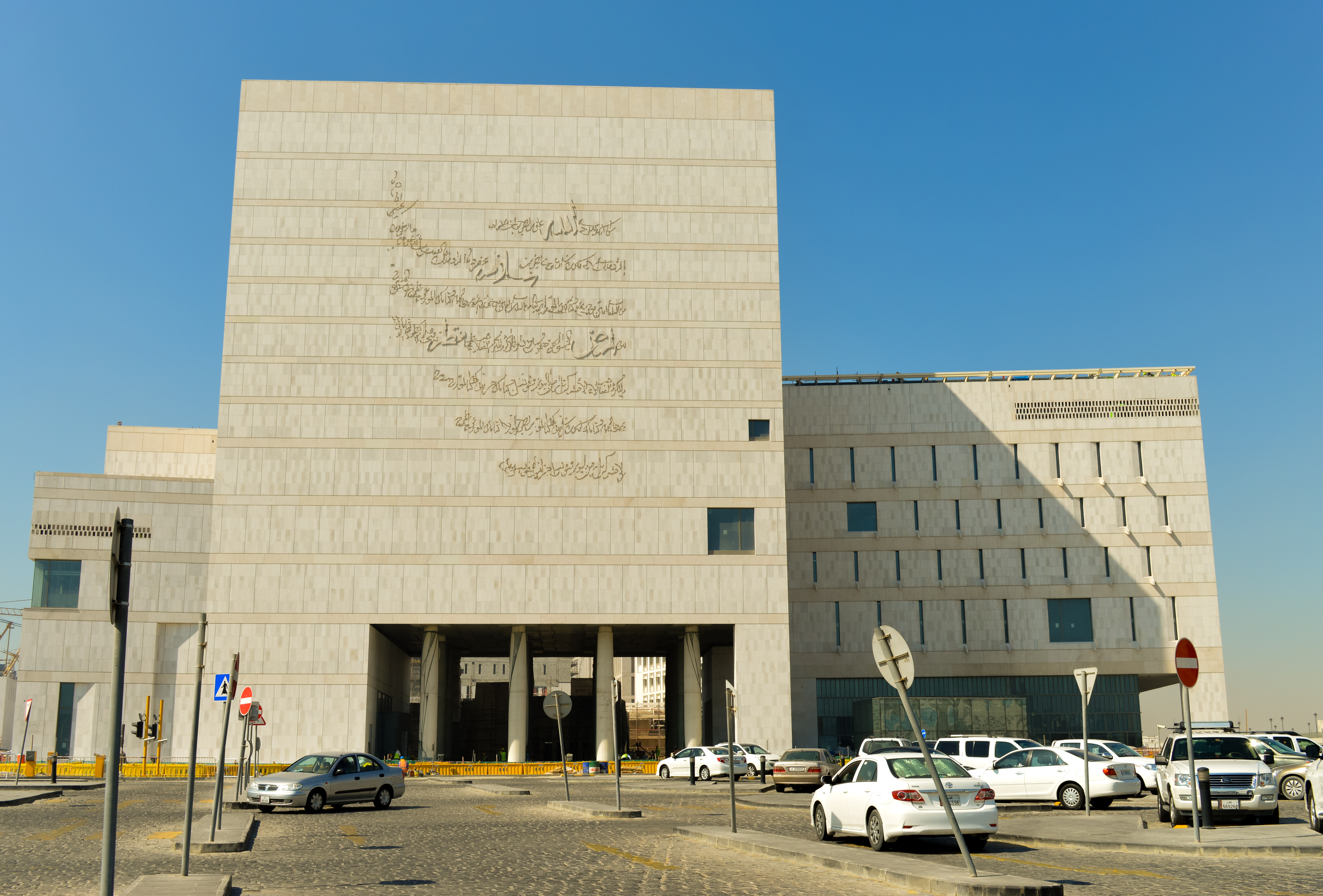
Qatar National Archives building in the Diwan Amiri Quarter

Subsequent phases include a 5-star Mandarin Oriental Hotel, Park Hyatt Doha and MGallery along with an additional hotel, commercial office space, a multitude of residential types and a wide variety of retail shops and restaurants. There is also a significant community and arts focus, featuring a cultural forum, school, nurseries and mosques.

=== Quarters ===
==== Diwan Amiri Quarter ====
Anchored at the northeast corner of the project, the Diwan Amiri Quarter is adjacent to both the Amiri Diwan and the Al Koot Fort.

==== Heritage Quarter ====
The Heritage Quarter is a historic area which contains traditional courtyard houses and the recently restored Msheireb Eid Prayer Ground, dating to the first decade of 20th century, alongside a newly constructed mosque. The newly renovated Msheireb Eid Prayer Ground, found opposite of Al Koot Fort and in close proximity to Souq Waqif, was inaugurated in October 2014. It occupies 3,200 square meters and can hold up to 3,600 worshippers.

This quarter hosts the Heritage Houses, which include the Bin Jelmood House, the Company House, the Mohammed bin Jassim House and the Radwani House. The Heritage Houses have been refurbished and re-purposed as individual museums that collectively constitute the Msheireb Museums, a project that was formally opened to the public in October 2015.

==== Retail Quarter ====
The largest of all five quarters, the Retail Quarter will feature the Galleria an enclosed shopping mall, with several international flagship stores, cinema, supermarket, children's edutainment zone and numerous dining outlets.

==== Mixed-Use & Residential Quarter ====
Mixed-Use Quarter will have a combination of commercial, retail and residential properties that overlap the Retail Quarter.

==== Business Gateway ====
Spread over 193,000 square metres, the Business Gateway will offer business amenities, supported by a mix of banking, personal and civic services.

== Design ==
Three-year project with leading architects, city planners, engineers, and academics (including specialists from Harvard, Princeton, Yale and MIT) to understand how insights from the past can be combined with present-day technologies and thinking to achieve a new, distinctly Qatari architectural language.

Language comprises seven 'steps' or distinct design principles: Past and Future; Individual and Collective; Space and Form; Aspects of Home; Aspects of the Street; Climate Design; Language of Architecture.

Approximately 25% of the city will be allocated towards residential developments. Hotels, shops and retail establishments will take up a combined space of 26%, while government buildings have been allotted roughly more than one-third of the entire area. The city is expected to accommodate around 15,000 residents.

Msheireb Downtown Doha is set to contain one of the largest collection of LEED-certified buildings in the world.

== Construction phases ==
The city has six construction phases: Phase 1A, Phase 1B, Phase 1C, Phase 2, Phase 3 and Phase 4.

=== Phase 1A ===
Consists of Diwan Ameri Quarter (Diwan Annex, Amiri Guard and National Archive), heritage buildings, mosque, amenities and infrastructure (district cooling plant, substations and service corridors); seven buildings in total.

Phase 1A's contract was awarded to a consortium consisting of Hyundai Engineering & Construction and Hamad Bin Khalid Contracting Company.

=== Phase 1B/1C ===
Comprises offices, town houses, apartments, amenities, hotel, civil buildings, school, cultural centre and mosque; total of 56 buildings.

Phase 1B began in December 2011, and Carillion and Qatar Building Company were selected as the main contractors. In January 2018, Carillion's UK business went into liquidation blaming its collapse on problem contracts including the Msheireb Downtown Doha project, where the company claimed it was owed £200m – former CEO Richard Howson said he felt like "a bailiff" in chasing the debt. However, this claim was quickly disputed by Msheireb Properties, who said it had continued to pay Carillion but Carillion did not pass funds on to its supply chain, leaving over 40 subcontractors unpaid, resulting in Msheireb incurring additional costs to pay Carillion's suppliers and engaging a new contractor to complete the project. The Qataris were prepared to testify to the UK Parliamentary committees investigating Carillion's collapse, provided written evidence to them, and were considering a £200m claim against Carillion. In June 2018, Carillion (Qatar) LLC went into liquidation.;

The project was expected to take two years, but the customer was said to have changed architect three times and issued 40,000 new drawings. The project was due to finish in December 2018.

Brookfield Multiplex and Medgulf were contracted for Phase 1C in November 2012.

=== Phase 2 ===
Mainly comprises retail, offices, apartments, cinemas, department store and hotel; ten buildings in total.

Phase 2 began in December 2012, with Arabtec being awarded the contract.

=== Phase 3 ===
Comprises retail, offices, apartments and hotel; 14 buildings in total.

In May 2013, Obayashi Corporation and Hamad Bin Khalid Contracting Company were awarded the contract for Phase 3.

=== Phase 4 ===
Mainly comprises residential and commercial buildings, retail, turn-key apartments, 5-star hotel, medical buildings, soft/hard landscapes, and interface with Metro projects. Fifteen buildings plus six basements (technical/service area and parking).

Phase 4 of over 350,000 M2 BUA (15 residential, commercial, medical and 5start hotel buildings plus six basement technical and parking) was awarded to Consolidated Contractors Group (Offshore)(CCC) and Teyseer Contracting (JV) (US$630 M) (GOLDEN LEED Certified); which was started in January 2017 and completed in March 2022. Phase 4 is considered to be one of the best phases in terms of quality of construction works and timely closure of technical and commercial works. Phase 4 was managed by Ihab Al Sharief (PD), Youssef Hazouri project (PM MEP), and Husam AJ Diyab (PM Controls/Contracts).

The fourth and final phase was officially completed in February 2022. All three residential blocks with hotel and service apartments, as well as the six commercial blocks are sustainable buildings architecturally similar to other buildings in the city.

== Sustainability ==
Sustainability is central to the Msheireb project, in terms of both the conservation of natural resources and the quality of its design.

All buildings within the development will target an average Gold rating under the internationally recognized LEED (Leadership in Energy and Environmental Design) certification system developed by the US Green Building Council, while several buildings will aim for a Platinum rating.

The entire project features sustainable design that consumes fewer resources, generates less waste, costs less to operate, and achieves a reduced carbon footprint.

Sustainability facts:

- Streets within Msheireb are oriented to capture cool breezes from the Gulf and shade most pedestrian routes from the hot sun.
- Buildings are massed to shade one another, and light coloured to reduce cooling requirements.
- Eco-friendly building material, thicker walls, heat-isolating glass that prevent the heat loss and keeps the internal temperature, resulting in lower use of energy for cooling.
- The city integrates 6,400 solar panels for electricity generation and 1,400 for water heating, alongside water treatment systems repurposed for cooling and irrigation. Energy-saving measures like insulating glass and thick walls.
- 30% energy reduction due to the improved building envelopes of walls and windows, recessed windows, energy recovery to the outside air entering the building, optimised and a high-efficiency district cooling plant.

== Gallery ==
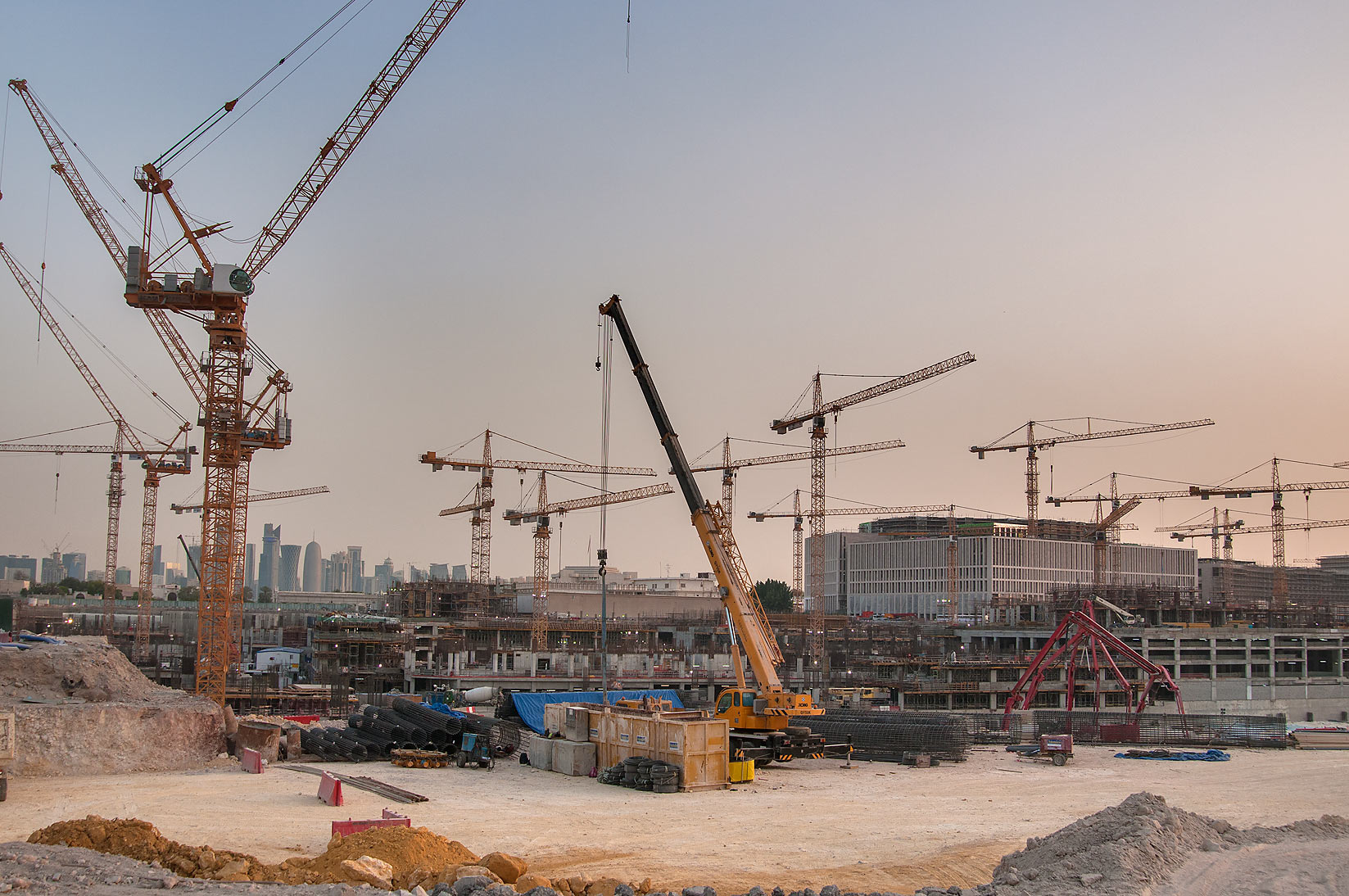
Construction in Msheireb Downtown Doha in 2013

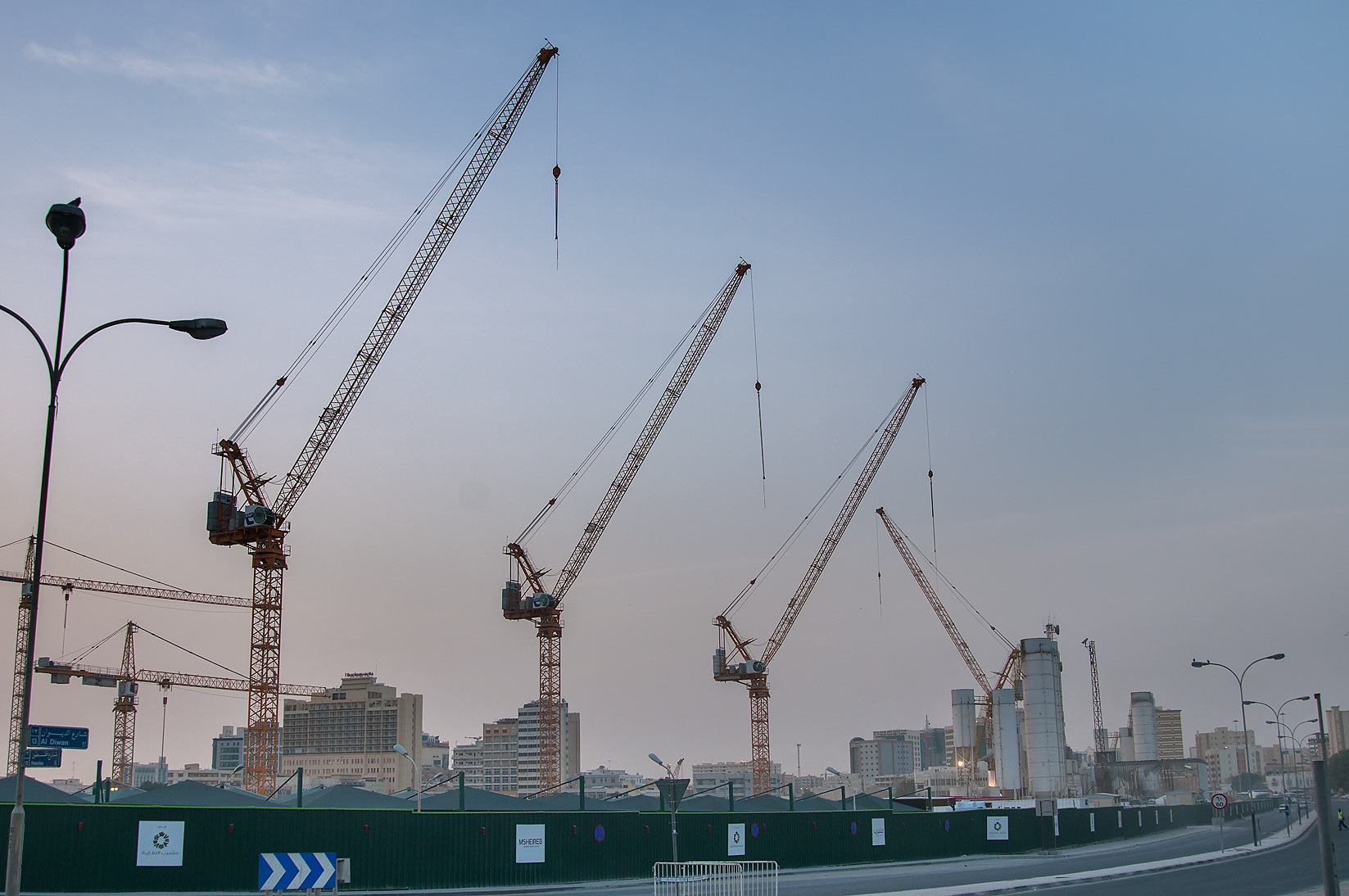
Roadside view of construction in Msheireb Downtown Doha in 2013

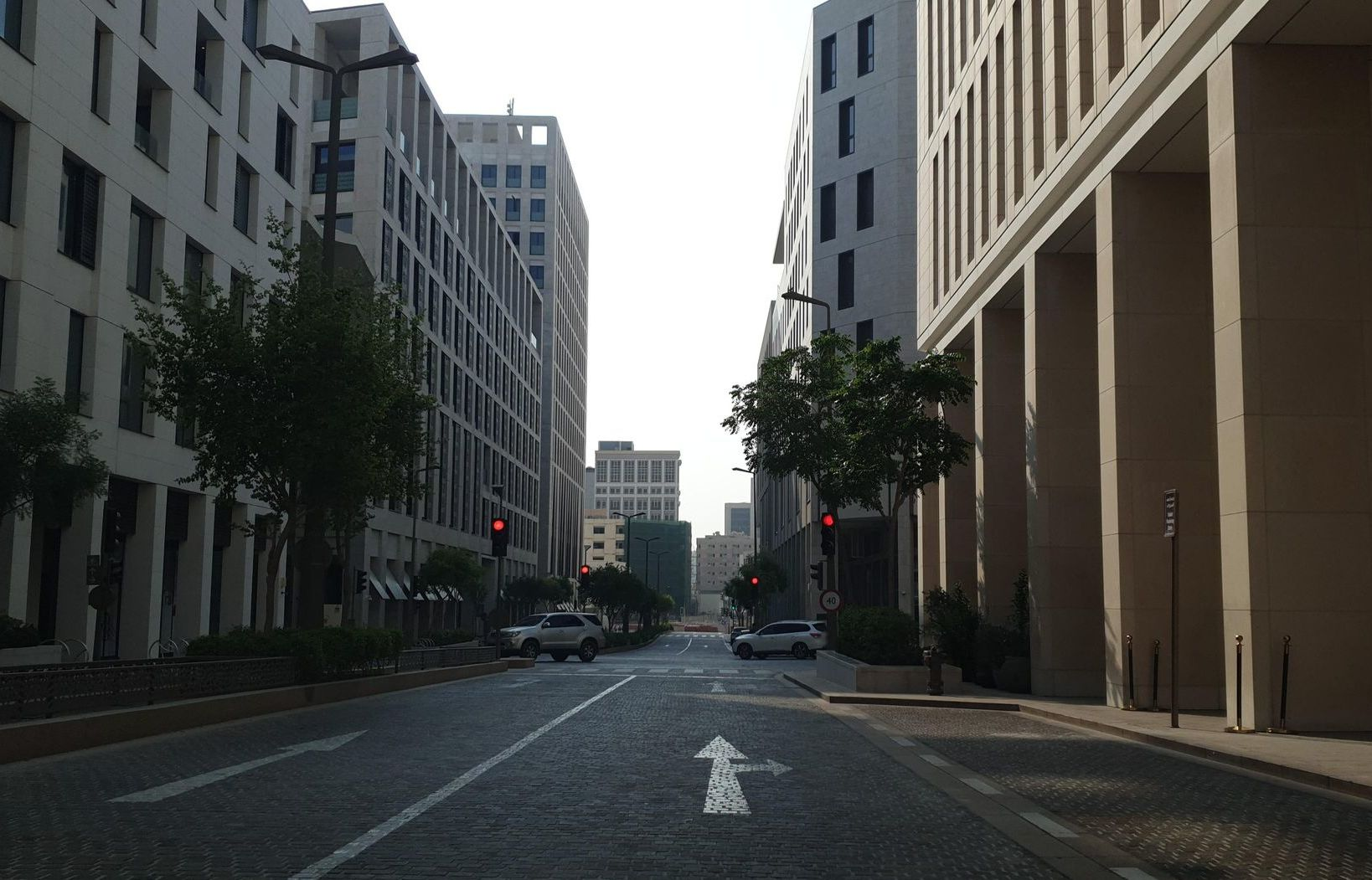
Musheireb downtown on Abdullah Bin Thani Street in 2021.

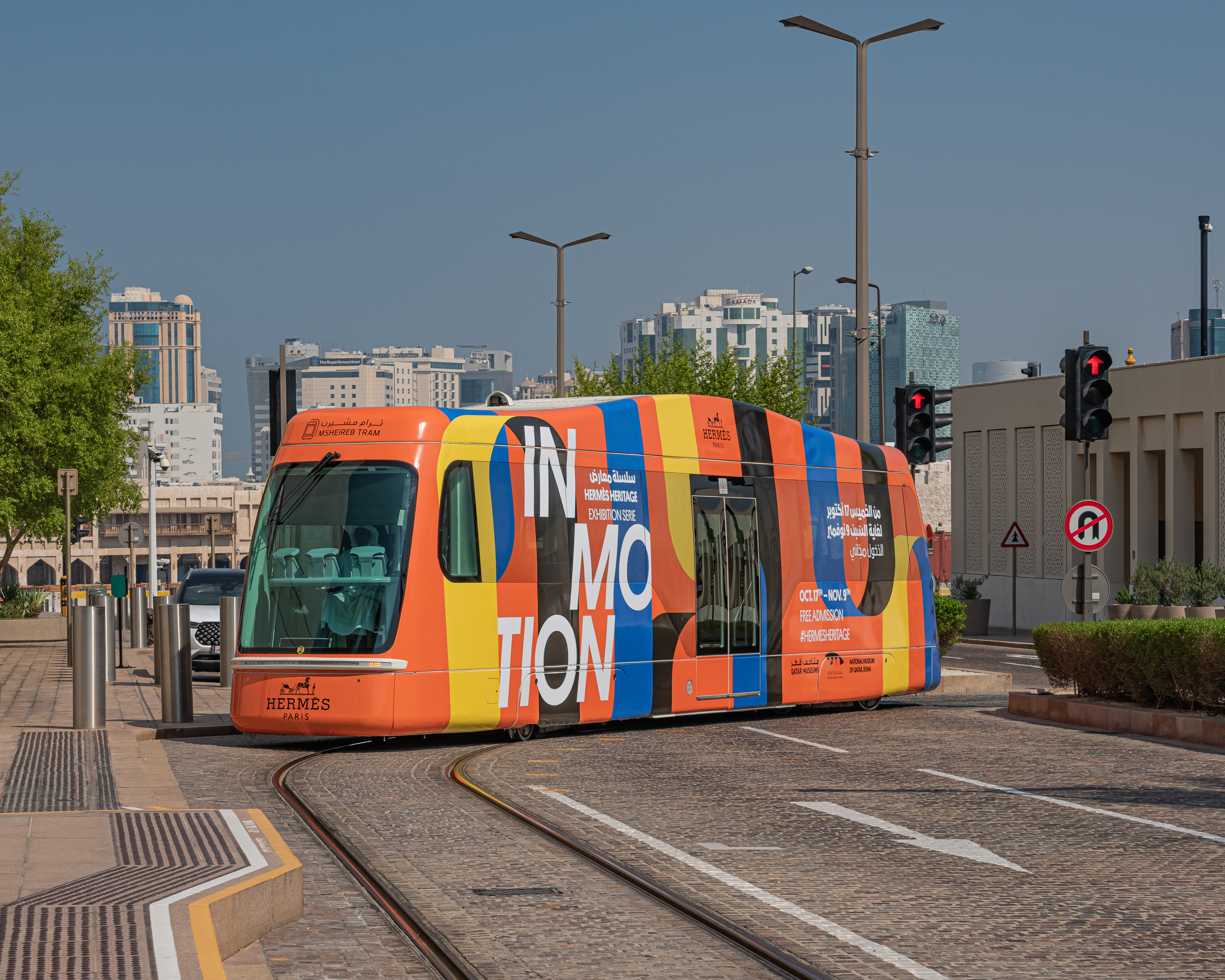
Msheireb Tram in Msheireb Downtown.

== See also ==
- Mushayrib
- Msheireb station
