= Msheireb station =

Metro station in Doha, Qatar

Msheireb مشيرب

General information
- Location: Msheireb development, Intersection of Wadi Msheireb and Al Diwan Street, Doha; Qatar
- Coordinates: 25.28278°N 51.52571°E

Construction
- Structure type: Underground
- Accessible: Yes

History
- Opened: 8 May 2019

Services
| Preceding station | Doha Metro | Following station |
|---|---|---|
| Al Bidda towards Lusail | Red Line | Al Doha Al Jadeda towards Al Wakra or Hamad International Airport T1 |
| Al Bidda towards Al Riffa | Green Line | Al Mansoura Terminus |
| Bin Mahmoud towards Al Aziziyah | Gold Line | Souq Waqif towards Ras Bu Aboud |
Location

Msheireb (Arabic: مشيرب) is a rapid transit station in Doha, Qatar located between Msheireb Downtown Doha and Mushayrib. It serves as a transfer station for the Red, Gold and Green lines of the Doha Metro and is considered the largest station in the city.

== History ==
In 2015, the station was planned to be completed by mid-2018, with six out of the 12 tunnel boring machine breakthroughs necessary completed. By February 2018, the main steel structure was complete and work moved into the stone roof cladding. In November 2018, work was almost finished, with only final touches remaining.

The station opened with the rest of the first phase of the Red Line on 8 May 2019. Service on the Gold and the Green lines began when they opened on 22 November, and 10 December of the same year, respectively.

Msheireb Metro Station was awarded the 2020 World Special Prize Interior by the Prix Versailles.

== Station layout ==
| G | Street level | Exit/entrance |
| -1 | Mezzanine | Fare control, ticket sales |
| -2 | Concourse | Shops |
| -3 | Northbound | toward Lusail |
| -3 | Island platform, doors will open on the left or right |
| -3 | South/Eastbound | toward Al Riffa |
| -3 | Southbound | toward Al Wakra/Hamad International Airport T1 |
| -3 | Island platform, doors will open on the left or right |
| -3 | North/Westbound | toward Al Mansoura |
| -4 | Westbound | toward Al Aziziyah |
| -4 | Side platform, doors will open on the left |
| -4 | Side platform, doors will open on the right |
| -4 | Eastbound | toward Ras Bu Aboud |

The Red and Green lines share the same set of platforms next to each other, while the Gold Line platforms are located east of the others and run perpendicular to them.

== Interchange ==
=== Metrolink connections ===
There are currently four metrolinks, which are the Doha Metro's free feeder bus network, servicing the station:

- M111, leading to Rawdat Al Khail,
- M108, leading to Mushaireb (Zone 13),
- M138, leading to Souq Waqif, Corniche and Banks Street,
- M101, leading to Medical Commission and Al Mamoura

=== Tram ===
Interchange to Msheireb Tram at Wadi Msheireb station.
