= Joaan =

Joaan may refer to:

- Joaan bin Hamad Al Thani (born 1986), a Qatari sheikh
- Joaan station, a metro station in Qatar
