= Msheireb Museums =

History museums in Doha, Qatar

- Established: October 20, 2015
- Location: Doha, Qatar
- Type: History Museum
- Owner: Msheireb Properties
- Website: msheirebmuseums.com/en/

Msheireb Museums is a complex of history museums housed in four historic heritage houses in Doha, the capital of Qatar. Each house explores a different aspect of the country's history through the trades and careers of its former residents: slavery, the oil industry, and folk arts and traditions.

General Manager of the Museum is Abdulla Al Naama, and Manager of Exhibitions and programs is Fahad Al Turky.

== Location ==
Msheireb Museums are located on Mohammed Bin Jassim Street, Doha, Qatar adjacent to both the Aimiri Diwan and the Qatari National Archive.

== History ==
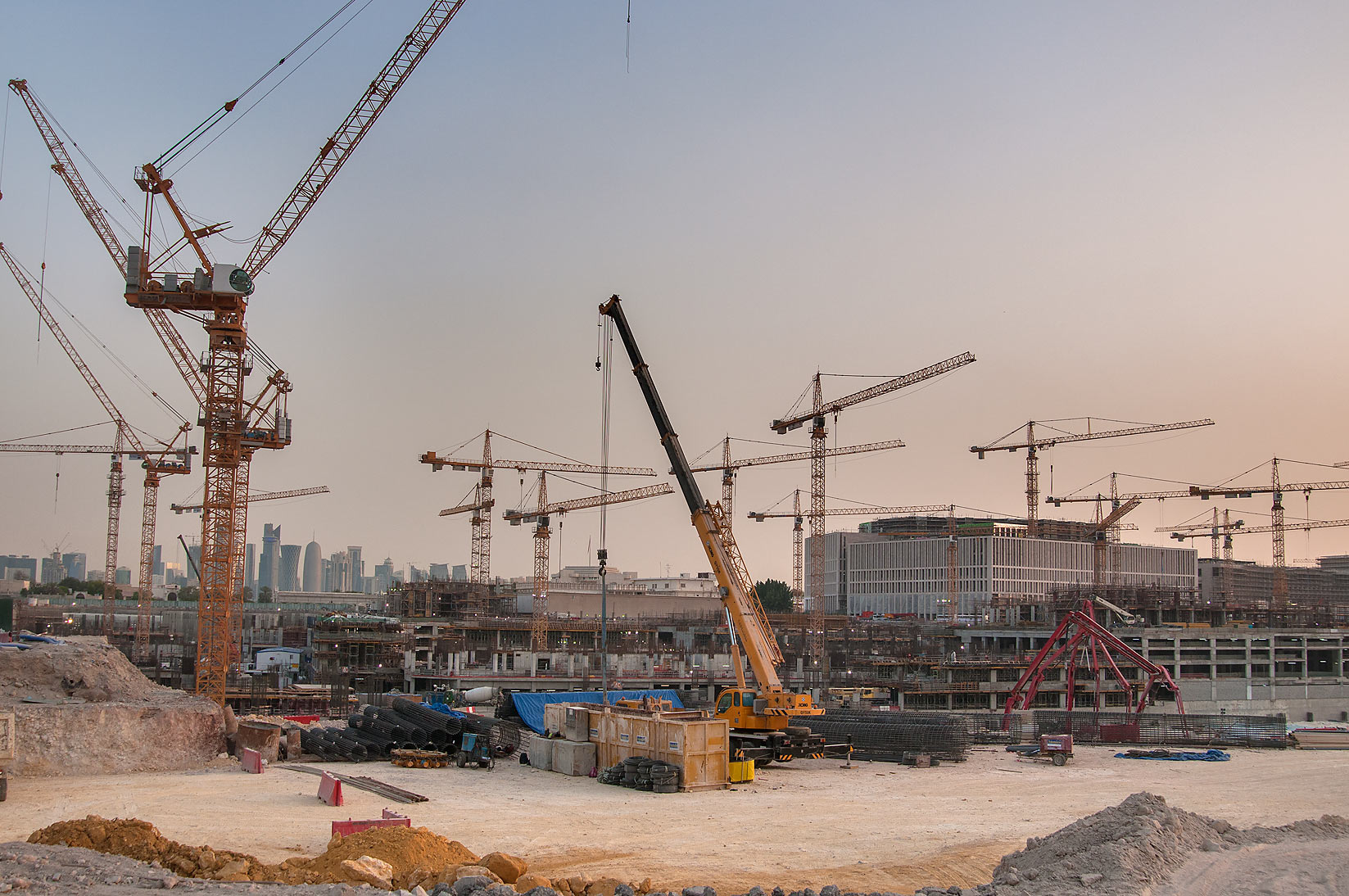
Msheireb development construction in 2013

The Msheireb Museums are part of the first phase of the inner city's regeneration of the old commercial centre, Msheireb Downtown Doha, by Msheireb Properties’ QR20 billion (US$5.5 billion), 310,000 sq m development.

The four heritage houses—Bin Jelmood House, Company House, Mohammed Bin Jassim House and Radwani House—date back to the 20th century, and the project architect for the renovations and additions was John McAslan. Work began in 2011 and was completed in 2015, the year the museums opened. In 2018, the museum was also included in the 2018 world's best new buildings list of the Royal Institute of British Architects.

In July 2021, the Msheireb Museum signed a memorandum of understanding (MoU) with the National Committee for Combating Human Trafficking to keep the ongoing exhibition covering modern-day slavery at the Bin Jelmood House up to date and to organize events raising awareness.

During the FIFA World Cup 2022, the primary celebration area for the Qatari National Team was located in the Heritage Zone of the museum. The museum also hosted events and exhibitions during the world cup.

In May 2023 the museum organized several events like a book signing or an exhibit of 3D printed building models around the International Museums Day. The museum is host to talks and lectures like the 'Earth Talk Series' or a TEDx Talk in 2023.

The museum held a conference together with the Georgetown University in Qatar in December 2023, which also featured an exhibition titled “I Can Only See Shadows”. In May 2024, Msheireb Museum, together with the Hamad Bin Khalifa University, began the four-year long "Future of Digital Citizenship in Qatar" research initiative. A collaboration with Qatar Foundation's Rasekh initiative began in September 2025 to incorporate information from the museum into the databank of the initiative.

In October 2025, the museum celebrated its 10th anniversary at the Bin Jelmood House. The event included the launch of two publications, one on Qatari architectural heritage and the other on the restoration of the four museum houses.

== Houses ==
=== Bin Jelmood House ===
Bin Jelmood House charts the history of the global slave trade, particularly the Indian Ocean slave trade of the region, and the changes caused by its abolition.

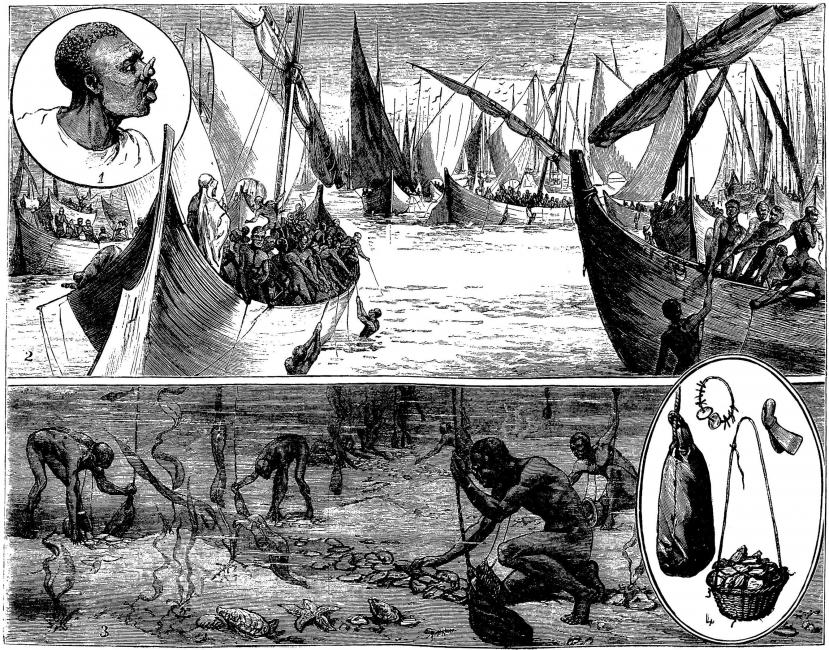
Pearl divers in the Persian Gulf in the late 19th century. The activity was largely carried out by enslaved workers.

Certain sections of the house are dedicated to the narration of the trade in enslaved people throughout the Indian Ocean, a vast region of which the countries of the Persian Gulf are a part of. This includes photographs and oral interviews with Qataris of enslaved ancestry, such as musician and actress Fatma Shaddad. Additionally, the house sheds light on the historic importation of slaves from Zanzibar to dive for pearls on behalf of their Qatari owners. In December 2021, an exhibition was put on display for the International Day for the Abolition of Slavery.

The Bin Jelmood House gallery hosted the "Frida Kahlo - The Immersive Biography" exhibition in 2022.

In August 2024, guided tours were held as part of the UNESCO-designated International Day for the Remembrance of the Slave Trade and its Abolition. The exhibition "For the Children of Gaza" was showcased from September until October 2024, organised together with Qatar Charity to raise awareness and funding for children affected by the conflict in Gaza.

=== Company House ===
This house recounts the history of the pioneering petroleum industry workers and their families whose work helped to transform Qatar. The house also hosts exhibitions like "Strange Wonders" in 2016, featuring artworks from ten alumni of the Virginia Commonwealth University in Qatar (VCUQatar), or "We are the Daughters of Qatar" in 2018.

=== Mohammed Bin Jassim House ===
Originally built by Sheikh Mohammed bin Jassim Al Thani, the son of the Qatar's founder, the Mohammed bin Jassim House focuses on the past, present and sustainable elements of the vast Msheireb Downtown Doha. It also houses the Echo Memory Art Project using objects uncovered during demolition of the site.

An exhibition called "Medhal: The Roots of Authenticity Extends... To Leave Generations as Art" was opened at the house in March 2023, displaying artworks from minors and employees of the house.

=== Radwani House ===
The Radwani House was first built in the 1920s. This house is located between Al Jasrah and Msheireb, two of Doha's oldest quarters. The house belonged to the Akbar Radwani family and shows how a traditional Qatari family lived.

== Transport links ==
The museums are located close to Heritage Quarter station of Msheireb Tram as well as Msheireb station of Doha Metro.

== See also ==
- List of museums in Qatar
- Intercontinental Slavery Museum
- Musée de Villèle
