= National Museum station =

Metro station in Qatar

National Museum metro station محطة مترو المتحف الوطني
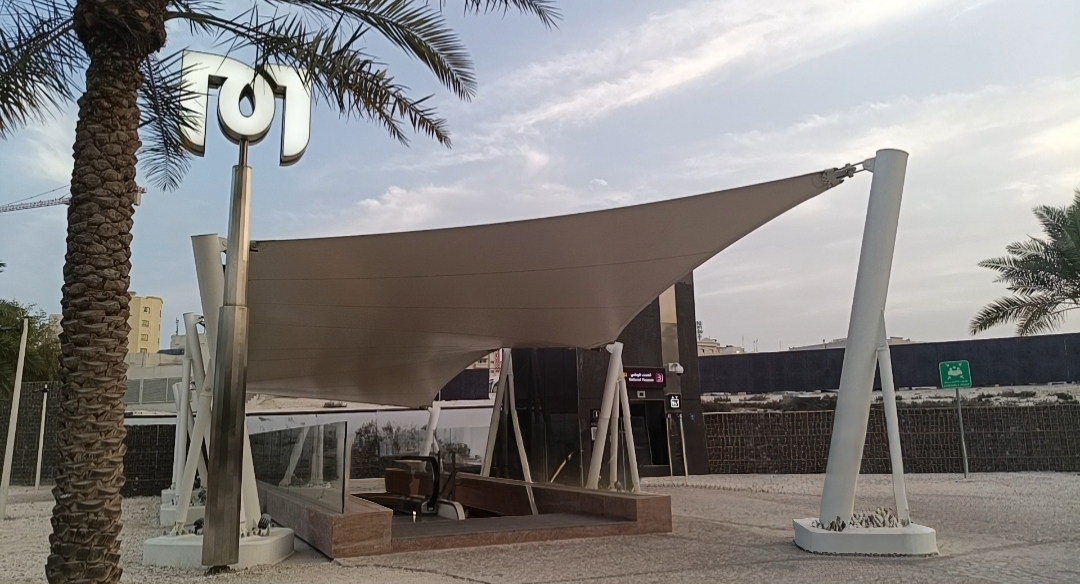

General information
- Location: As Salatah, Doha; Qatar
- Coordinates: 25.28467°N 51.54928°E
- Owner: Qatar Rail
- Operator: Doha Metro
- Platforms: 2
- Tracks: 2

Construction
- Structure type: Underground
- Parking: Yes
- Accessible: Yes

Other information
- Website: http://www.qr.com.qa/

History
- Opened: 21 November 2019

Services
Preceding station	Doha Metro	Following station
Souq Waqif towards Al Aziziyah	Gold Line	Ras Bu Aboud Terminus
Location

National Museum station is a station on the Doha Metro's Gold Line and serves the nearby National Museum of Qatar in the Qatari capital Doha.

== History ==
The station was opened to the public on 21 November 2019 along with ten other Gold Line stations, over six months after the opening of the network's first 13 stations on the Red Line.

== Station facilities ==
Facilities in the station include a prayer room and restrooms.

== Connections ==
There is one metrolink, which is the Doha Metro's free feeder bus network, servicing the station:

- M315, which serves Al Mirqab and As Salatah.
