= Zone 3, Qatar =

Zone 3
- Zone
- Interactive map of Zone 3
- Coordinates: 25.285°N 51.520°E
- Country: Qatar
- Municipality: Doha
- Time zone: Arabia Standard Time

Zone 3 is a zone of the municipality of Doha in the state of Qatar. The main districts recorded in the 2015 population census were Fereej Mohammed Bin Jasim and Mushayrib.
