= Msheireb Tram =

Tram network in Doha, Qatar

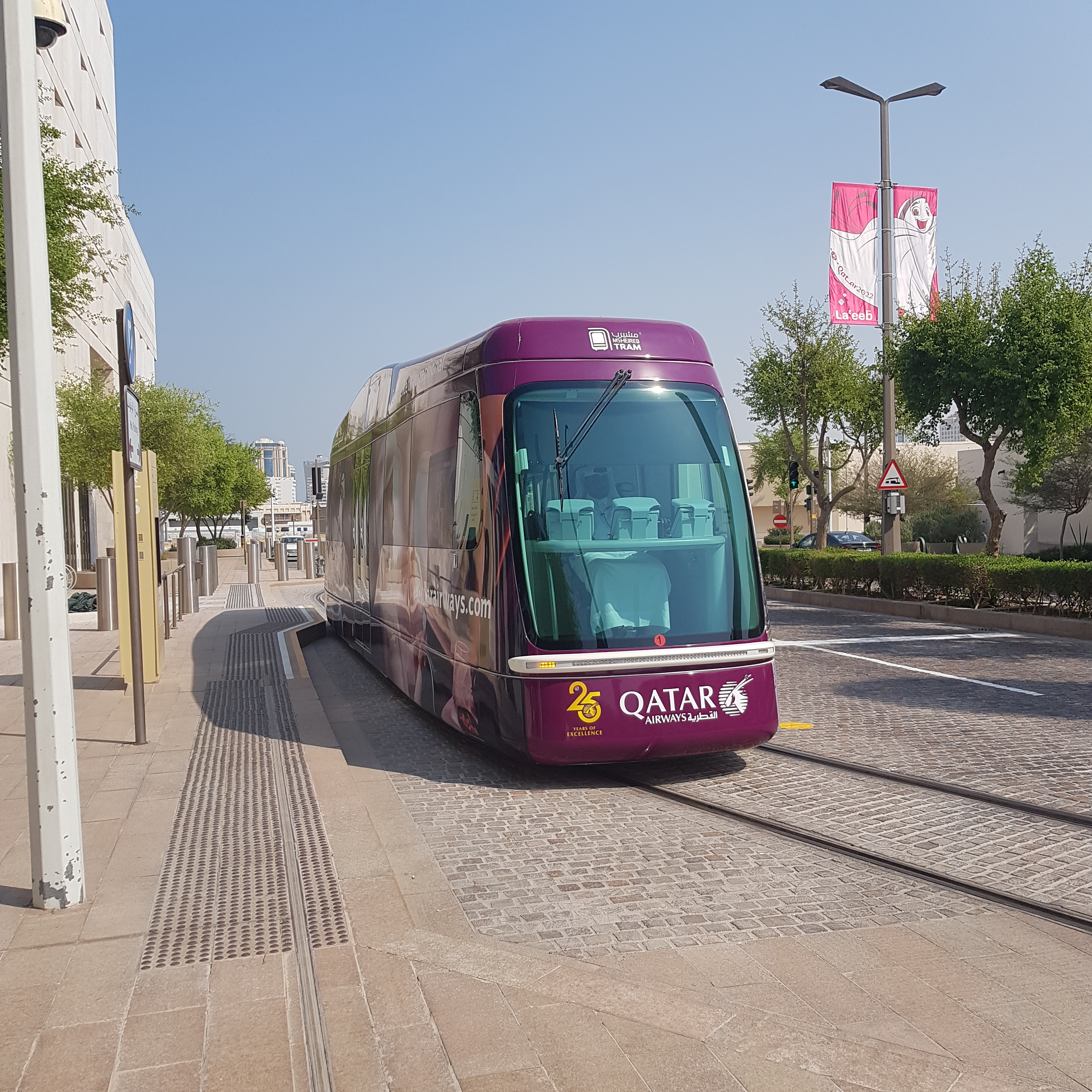

Overview
- Owner: Msheireb Properties (subset Qatar Foundation)
- Locale: Doha
- Transit type: Tram
- Number of lines: 1
- Number of stations: 9
- Headquarters: Doha

Operation
- Began operation: 30 December 2019
- Number of vehicles: 3
- Train length: 3

Technical
- System length: 2.12 km (1.32 mi)
- Track gauge: Standard gauge 1,435 mm (4 ft 8 1/2 in)
- Top speed: 20 Km/h (12 Mp/h)

Msheireb Tram is a transport network in Msheireb Downtown of Doha. The Tram network is a single 2 km, closed-loop track system that includes nine stops, making it easier for visitors to access all parts of the city district. The network uses three hydrogen vehicles. The Msheireb Tram interconnects the entirety of Msheireb Downtown Doha, running along a two-kilometre closed loop track that takes roughly 18 minutes to complete. The network is served by a fleet of three hydrogen vehicles provided by TIG/m, United States. Built at the TIG/m facility in California, the cars are air-conditioned, have Wi-Fi and feature light-filtering glass panels that reduce the sun's heat effect by 90 percent.

== Stations ==
- Sahat Al Nakheel Station
- Wadi Msheireb Station
- Galleria Station
- Msheireb Prayer Ground Station
- Heritage Quarter station
- Al Baraha Station
- Sahat Al-Masjid Station
- Al Kahraba Street Station
- Al Mariah Street Station

== Interchange ==
Intrchange to all lines of Doha Metro as well as some city- and local bus lines at Wadi Msheireb station.
