= Joaan station =

Metro station in Qatar

Joaan metro station محطة مترو جوعان

General information
- Location: Al Sadd, Doha; Qatar
- Coordinates: 25.28077°N 51.49657°E
- Owner: Qatar Rail
- Operator: Doha Metro
- Platforms: 2
- Tracks: 2

Construction
- Structure type: Underground
- Parking: No
- Accessible: Yes

Other information
- Website: http://www.qr.com.qa/

History
- Opened: 21 November 2019

Services
Preceding station	Doha Metro	Following station
Al Sudan towards Al Aziziyah	Gold Line	Al Sadd towards Ras Bu Aboud
Location

Joaan station on the Gold Line of Qatar's Doha Metro serves Al Sadd district.

== History ==
The station was opened to the public on 21 November 2019 along with ten other Gold Line stations, over six months after the opening of the network's first 13 stations on the Red Line.

== Station facilities ==
Facilities in the station include a prayer room and restrooms, as well as several retail stores.

== Connections ==
One route of metrolink, which is the Doha Metro's free feeder bus network, services the station:

- M314, which serves Al Mirqab Al Jadeed and As Salatah.
