= Fereej Mohammed Bin Jasim =

- District
- Location within Doha Location within Qatar
- Coordinates: 25°17′8″N 51°31′36″E
- Country: Qatar
- Municipality: Doha
- Zone: Zone 3
- District no.: 3

Area
  - Total: 0.050 sq mi (0.13 km^{2})

Population (2010)
  - Total: 4,886

Fereej Mohammed Bin Jasim (Arabic: فريج محمد بن جاسم, romanized: Farīj Moḥammed Bin Jāsim) is a district in Qatar, located in the municipality of Doha. It is bordered by Mushayrib, which it shares Zone 3 with. The district was first mentioned in the 1940s.

The name is derived from Mohammed bin Jassim Al Thani, who was a major landowner in the area.
