= Fereej Bin Mahmoud =

Fereej Bin Mahmoud فريج بن محمود
- District
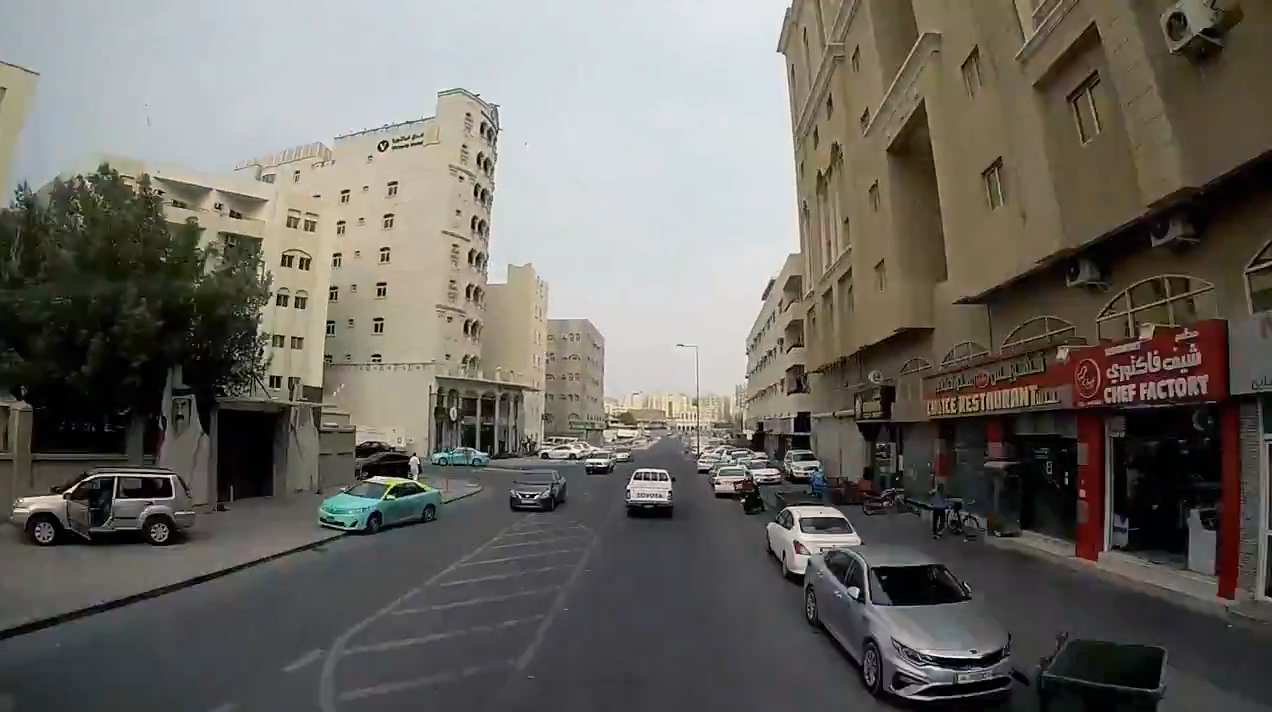
- Shops on Qatari Bin Al Fujaah Street

- Location within Doha Location within Qatar
- Coordinates: 25°16′42″N 51°30′49″E
- Country: Qatar
- Municipality: Doha
- Zone: Zone 22, Zone 23
- District no.: 19

Area
  - Total: 1.8 km^{2} (0.69 sq mi)

Population (2010)
  - Total: 24,172
  - Density: 13,000/km^{2} (35,000/sq mi)

Fereej Bin Mahmoud (Arabic: فريج بن محمود, romanized: Farīj Bin Maḥmūd) is a neighborhood of Doha, Qatar. It is one of the older multipurpose districts, with an active business scene and relatively large housing market. Located in Doha's downtown area, next to the historic district of Mushayrib, the area underwent considerable development in the 1970s. At 1.8 km^{2}, it is a relatively large district compared to neighboring districts, and is well-connected to Doha's road network, through C Ring Road and Salwa Road. In terms of housing, apartment buildings are the dominant housing type.

== Etymology ==
Similar to many other districts in downtown Doha, the area is named after its founders. The first word, fareej, translates roughly to "neighborhood", while the second constituent was borrowed from the name of the first tribe to settle the area: the Al Mahmoud tribe.

== Transport ==
Major roads that run through the district are Al Rayyan Road, Suhaim Bin Hamad Street, Al Khaleej Street, and Salwa Road.

The underground Bin Mahmoud Metro Station is part of Doha Metro's Gold Line.

== Demographics ==
As of the 2010 census, the district comprised 8,398 housing units and 814 establishments. There were 24,172 people living in the district, of which 68% were male and 32% were female. Out of the 24,172 inhabitants, 79% were 20 years of age or older and 21% were under the age of 20.

Employed persons made up 67% of the total population. Females accounted for 16% of the working population, while males accounted for 84% of the working population.
