= Intercontinental Slavery Museum =

Museum in Port Louis, Mauritius

Coordinates: 20.1588°S 57.5020°E

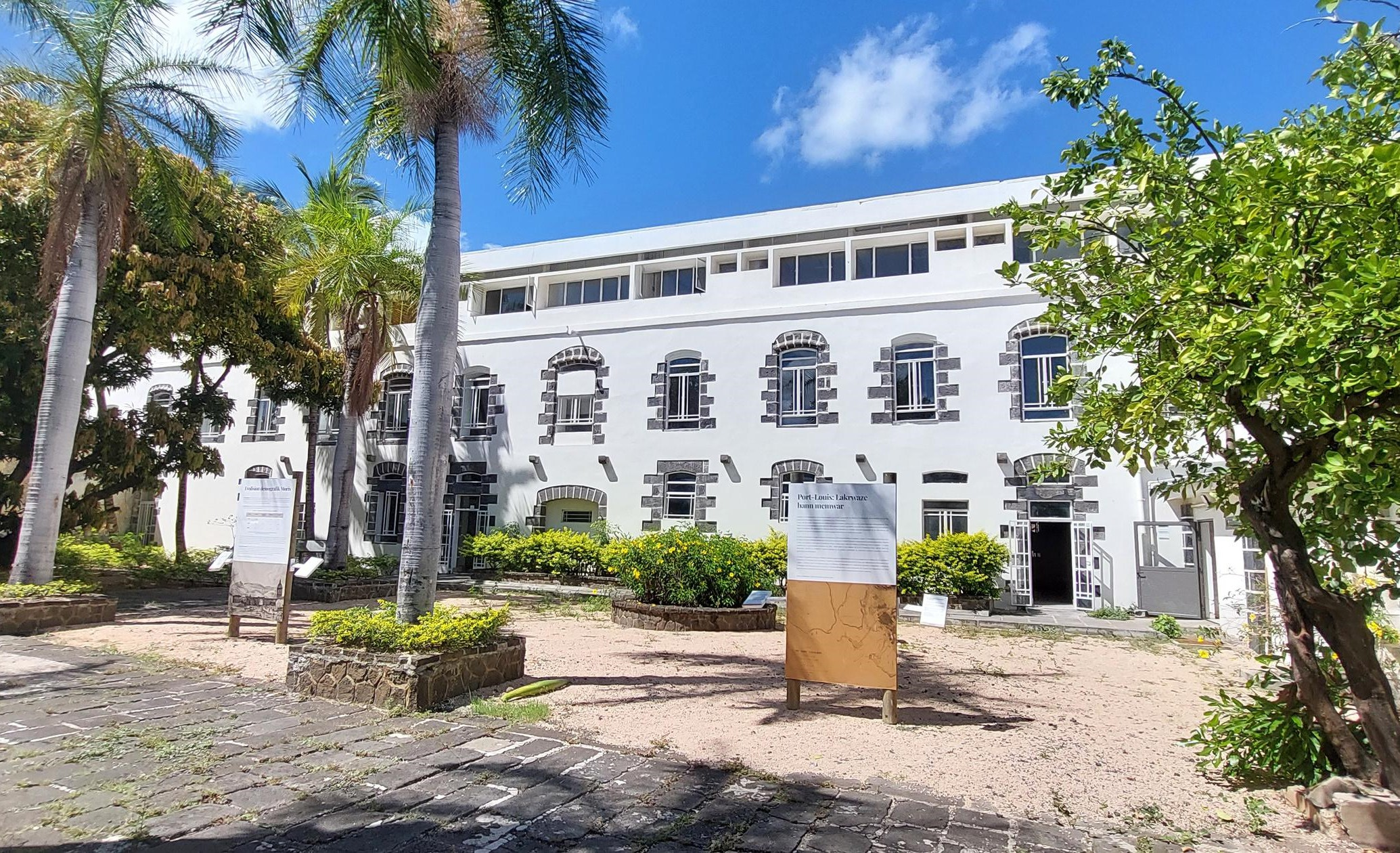
- Established: 4 September 2023
- Location: Port Louis, Mauritius
- Type: History museum
- Website: ismmauritiusltd.govmu.org/ism/

The Intercontinental Slavery Museum is a museum located in Port Louis, the capital of Mauritius. Dedicated to the history of slavery and indentured labor, it opened on 4 September 2023, and is housed in the city's former military hospital, built in 1740 during the French colonial era.

== History ==
=== The former military hospital ===
The Intercontinental Slavery Museum is housed in the former military hospital in Port Louis, the island's oldest building. It was established to address the inadequacies of the original hospital, and its location was chosen for its proximity to the port, allowing for the rapid transport of wounded soldiers and officers.

It was built between 1736 and 1740 under Mahé de Labourdonnais, governor of the French colony of Île de France (present-day Mauritius). The construction work was carried out by 40 Mozambican and Malagasy slaves, along with a few slaves from West Africa, all belonging to the French East India Company. A dozen Indian masons and carpenters from Pondicherry and Karikal also worked on the structure.

In the building, European soldiers were quartered on the upper floor, while the ground floor housed the slaves in two small rooms. Between 1737 and 1744, equal numbers of soldiers and workers, on the one hand, and slaves, on the other, were treated at the military hospital. However, in 1750, the number of sick captives rose sharply; the majority consisted of several hundred individuals arriving from Senegal in very poor condition.

From 1782 onwards, smallpox caused an exponential rise in the number of sick people. It was then decided to build a second hospital specifically for enslaved people, in order to separate them from the soldiers. This decision was heavily criticized by the colonists.

Under British occupation, the hospital was converted into a penal colony for escaped slaves. Then, following the abolition of slavery in Mauritius in 1835, it reverted to being a civil hospital.

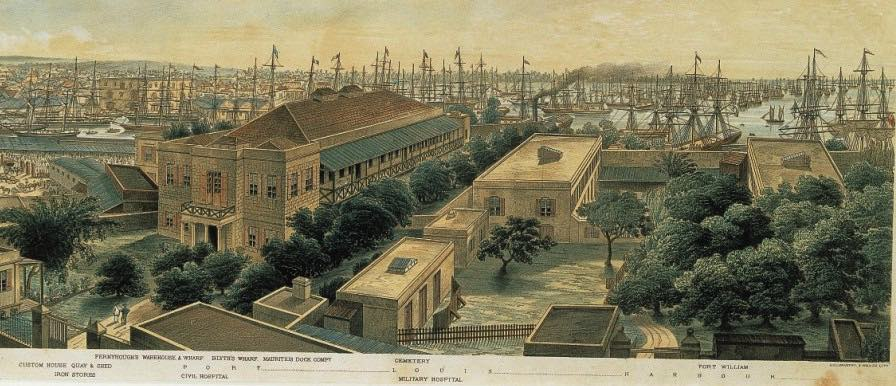
View of the hospital in 1859 (on the right)

In 1890, the building was sold to the Arabian Dock Company, which used it as a cold storage facility, offices, and warehouses. Between 1977 and 2007, it served as the headquarters of the DWC (Development Works Corporation).

Finally, its heritage value was recognized in 1999, when the military hospital was designated a national monument—a recognition reaffirmed in 2003.

=== Conversion into a museum ===
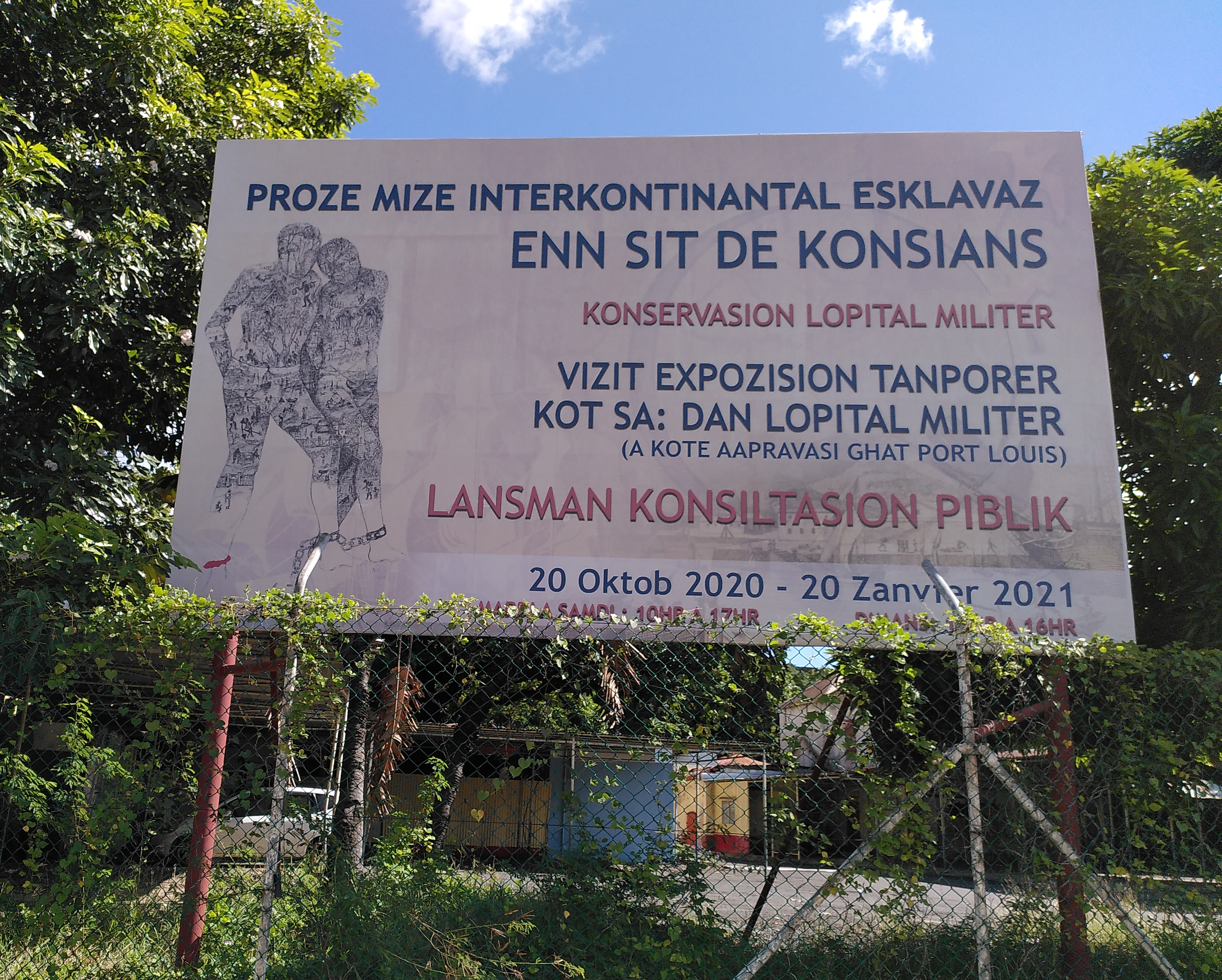
Museum information panel in Mauritian Creole

In 2011, the Truth and Justice Commission, established to reconcile the Mauritian population with its history, submitted its findings and recommended rehabilitating the building to transform it into a museum.

The restoration of the building is funded by the Mauritian government, donations from the Heritage Lottery, and contributions from France, Japan, and the United States. Researchers and students from the University of Nantes and the Aquitaine Museum in Bordeaux have contributed their expertise to the layout of the museum's various spaces.

The Intercontinental Slavery Museum opens its doors to the public in 2023, twelve years after the work of the Truth and Justice Commission, which was established to reconcile the Mauritian population with its history.

Led by the Intercontinental Slavery Museum Limited Mauritius, the museum aims to :

- offer a unique experience of human tragedy, resistance, and survival,
- break the chains of the legacy of slavery to reveal the truth, paving the way for justice and reconciliation.

The project's creator, Mozambican historian Benigna Zimba, wants the Intercontinental Slavery Museum to also have branches in the countries from which Mauritius's population originated.

== Collections ==
Among the items on display are objects that belonged to enslaved people—such as buttons, bone tools, earrings, and a rosary—but most notably, the sixty-three ethnographic busts created by Eugène de Froberville in 1846 at a Mauritian plantation. These plaster casts, modeled on enslaved Africans from Mozambique, Tanzania, and the Comoros, are owned by the municipality of Blois, France, and housed at the Château de Blois. An agreement was signed between ISM Mauritius Ltd and the city of Blois to allow them to be exhibited in Port Louis.

== See also ==
- Aapravasi Ghat
- Blue Penny Museum
- Msheireb Museums
