= Mushayrib =

Musheireb مشيرب
- District
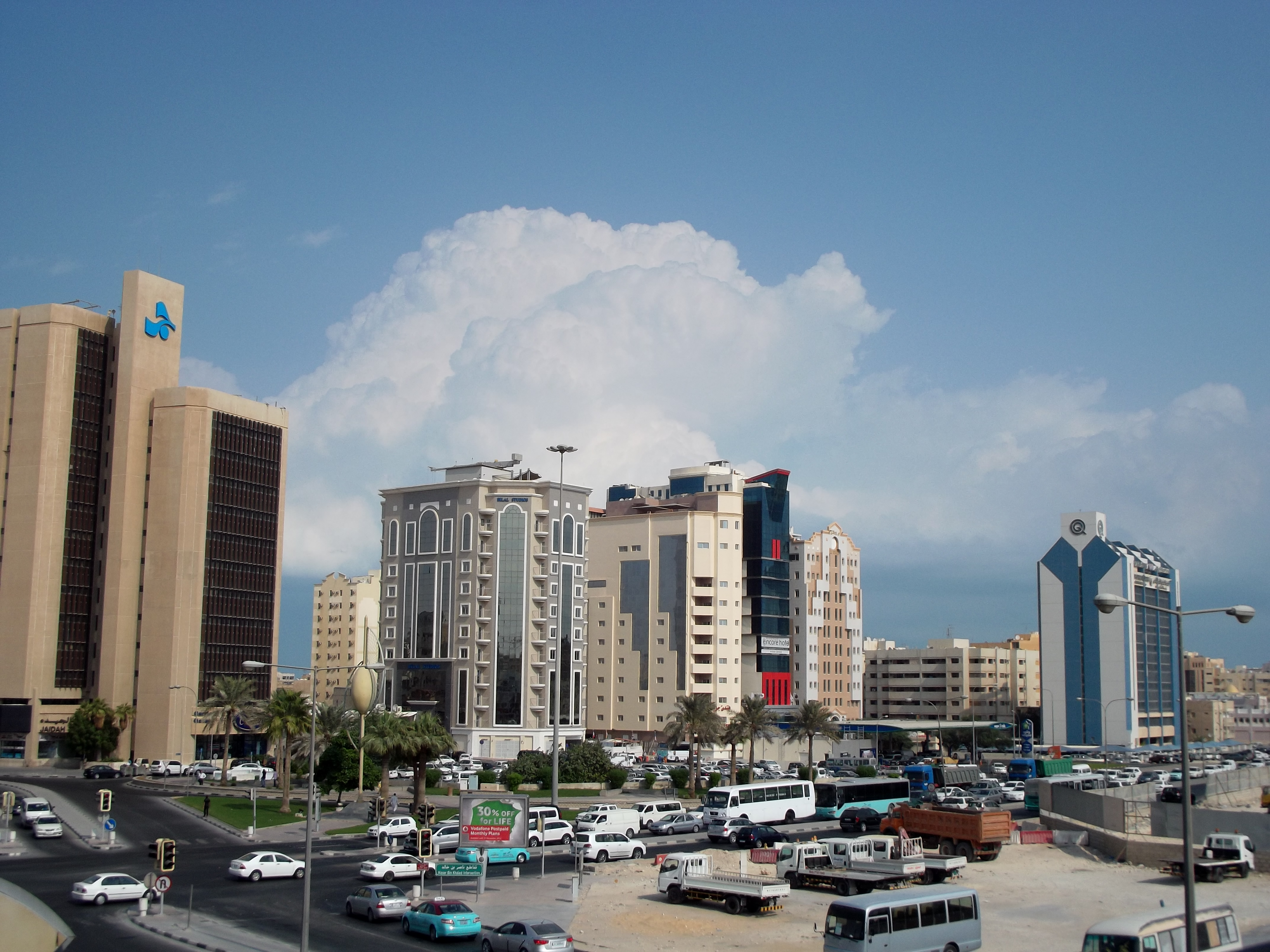
- Musheireb skyline in 2012

- Location within Doha Location within Qatar
- Coordinates: 25°17′N 51°31′E
- Country: Qatar
- Municipality: Doha
- Zone: Zone 3, Zone 4, Zone 13
- District no.: 4

Area
  - Total: 1.0 km^{2} (0.39 sq mi)

Population
  - Total: 22,711
  - Density: 23,000/km^{2} (59,000/sq mi)

Mushayrib (Arabic: مشيرب; also spelled Musheireb and Msheireb) is a Qatari district located in the municipality of Doha. As of the 2010 census, the former district of Al Asmakh has been integrated into Mushayrib. It is one of the oldest districts of Doha, and contains Al Kahraba Street (also called Electricity Street), the country's first fully lit street.

== History ==
In J. G. Lorimer's Gazetteer of the Persian Gulf first published in 1908, Mushayrib was described as a place where the town of Al Bidda obtained its water supply from, but described the water as brackish and scanty. Lorimer noted that it appeared to accommodate one of the only seven sizable date palm plantations in Qatar.

The majority of Mushayrib's residents are expat workers. In 2014, the government forcibly evicted several hundred residents from the neighborhood in preparation for the development of several new up-scale buildings and the demolition of older buildings.

== Localities ==
=== Al Asmakh ===
Formerly a stand-alone district, Al Asmakh has been amalgamated into Mushayrib since the 21st century. Al Asmakh was initially recognized as a formal district of Doha around the 1930s. Located near Souq Waqif, it covers an area of about 326,000 sq m^{2}. Although most of its historic architecture has been degraded or demolished, there remains some standing buildings which date back to the early 20th century. Currently, it is populated mainly by migrant workers. Residential housing in the area is tightly packed and the streets are relatively narrow.

== Msheireb Downtown Doha ==
The Msheireb Downtown Doha project was launched in January 2010 with the end goal of a complete overhaul and refurbishment of the district. It is a $5.5 billion project, covering an area of 31 hectares (77 acres) (310,000 square metres), and was launched in six phases.

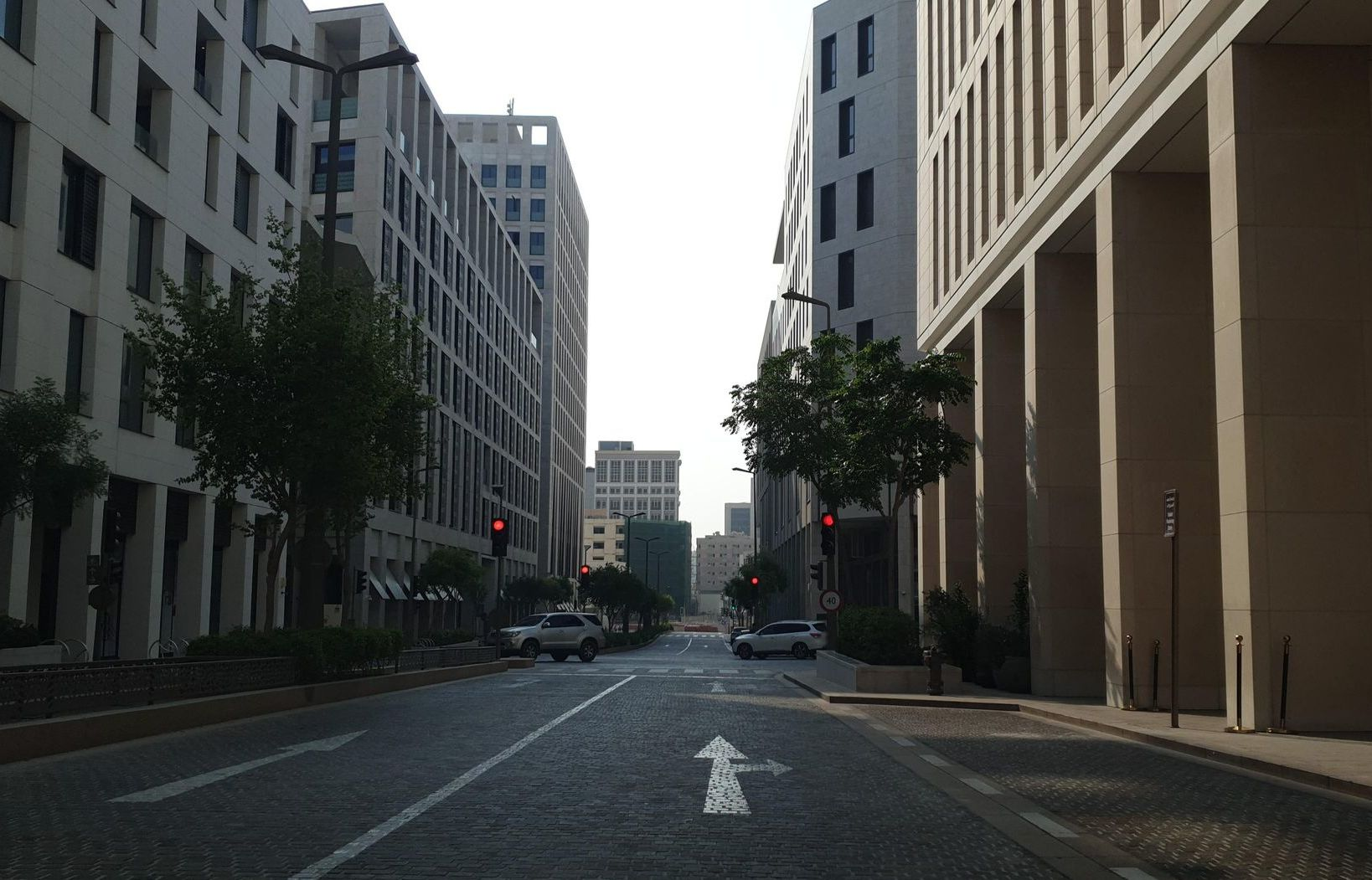
Musheireb downtown on Abdullah Bin Thani Street in 2021.

== Transport ==
The underground Msheireb station serves the Doha Metro's Red Line, Green Line and Gold Line. Launched in May 2019, it is the country's largest metro station. It is located in Msheireb Downtown Doha, at the intersection of Wadi Msheireb and Al Diwan Street.

== Demographics ==
At the 2010 census, the district comprised 6,745 housing units and 1,009 establishments. There were 22,711 people living in the district, of which 83% were male and 17% were female. Out of the 22,711 inhabitants, 88% were 20 years of age or older and 12% were under the age of 20.

Employed persons made up 79% of the total population. Females accounted for 4% of the working population, while males accounted for 96% of the working population.

Year	Population
1986	7,333
1997	7,914
2004	9,655
2010	22,711

== Gallery ==
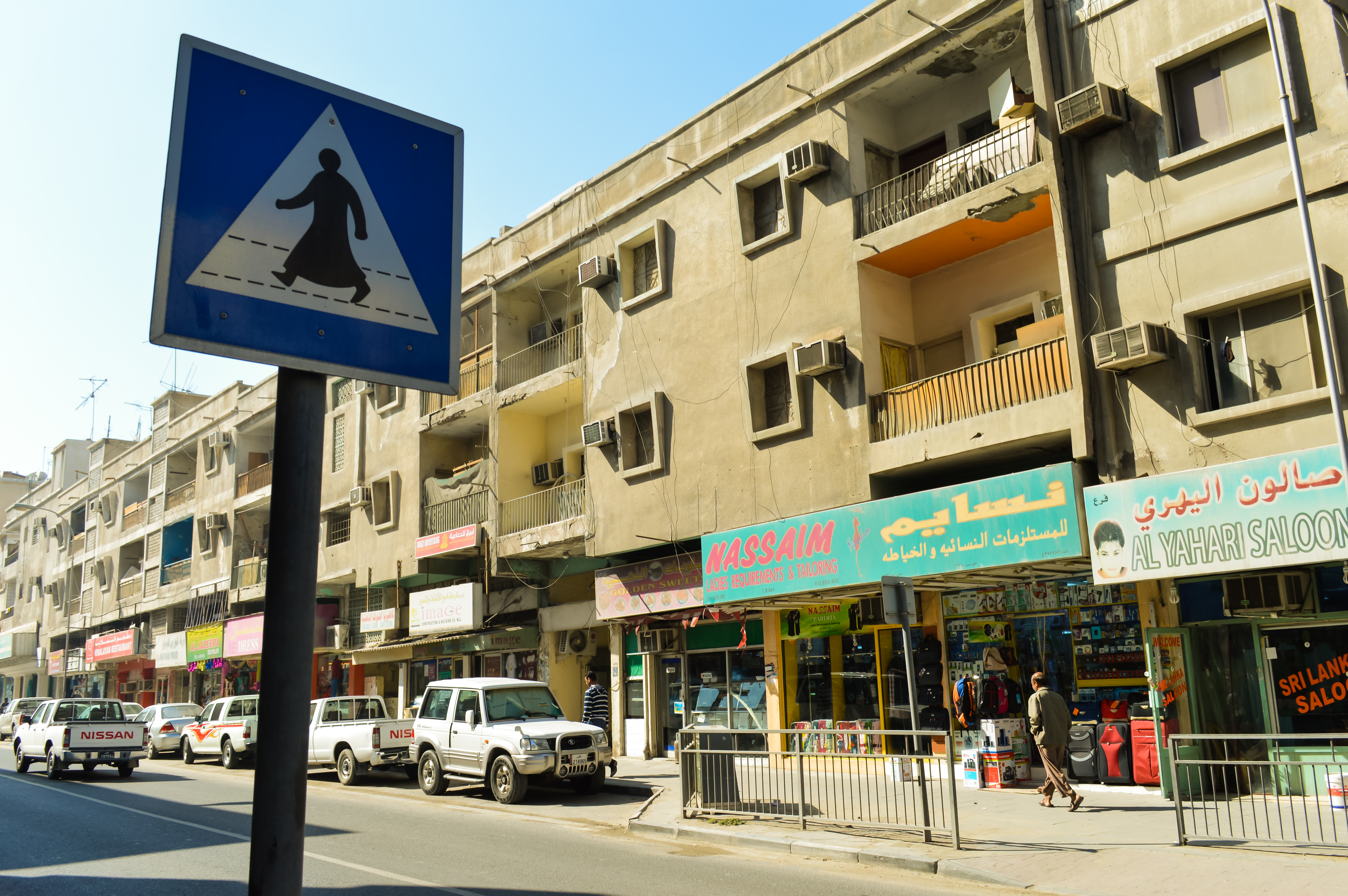
Crosswalk in Musheireb.

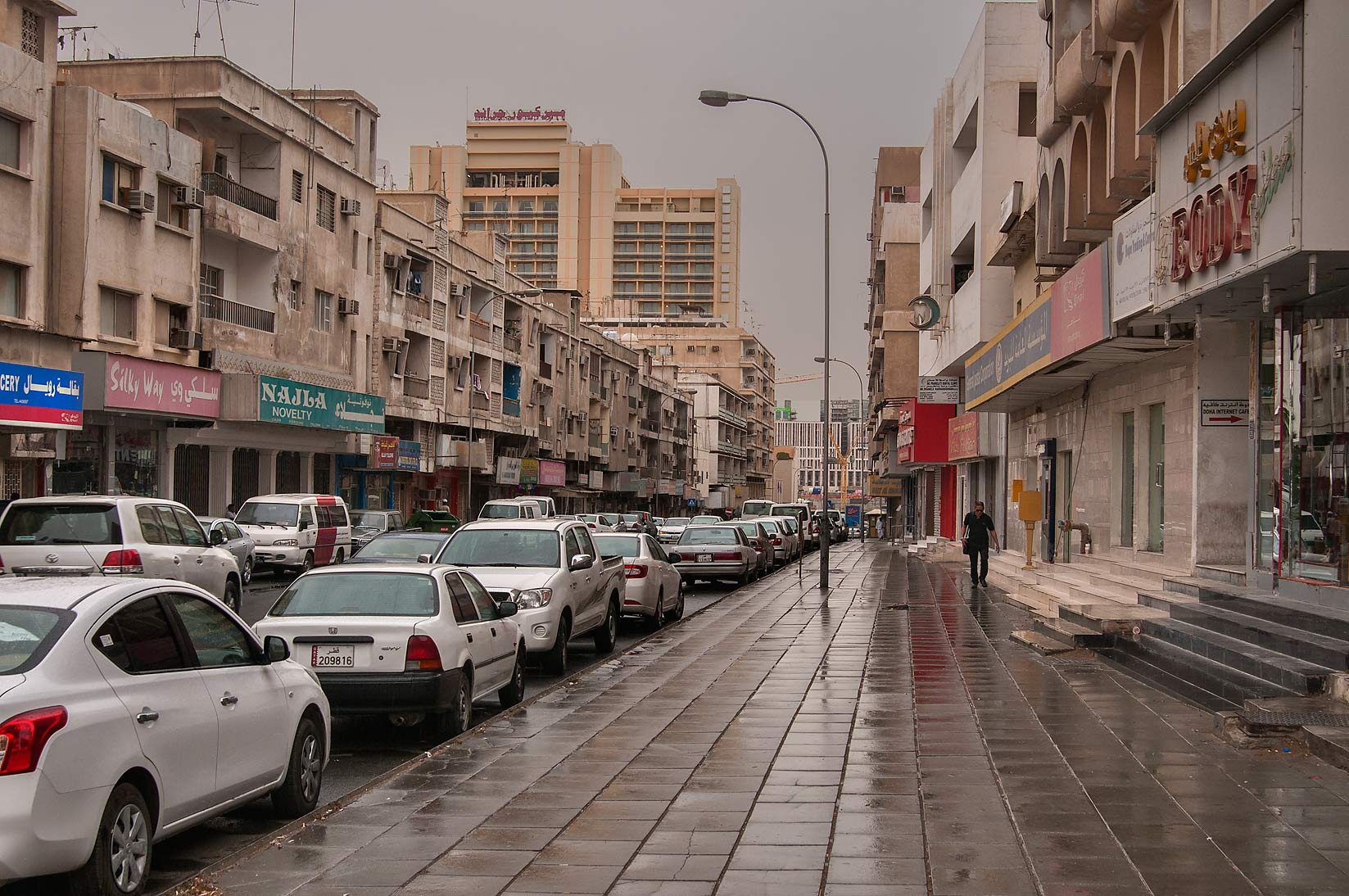
Abdulla Bin Thani Street in Mushayrib during rain in 2013.

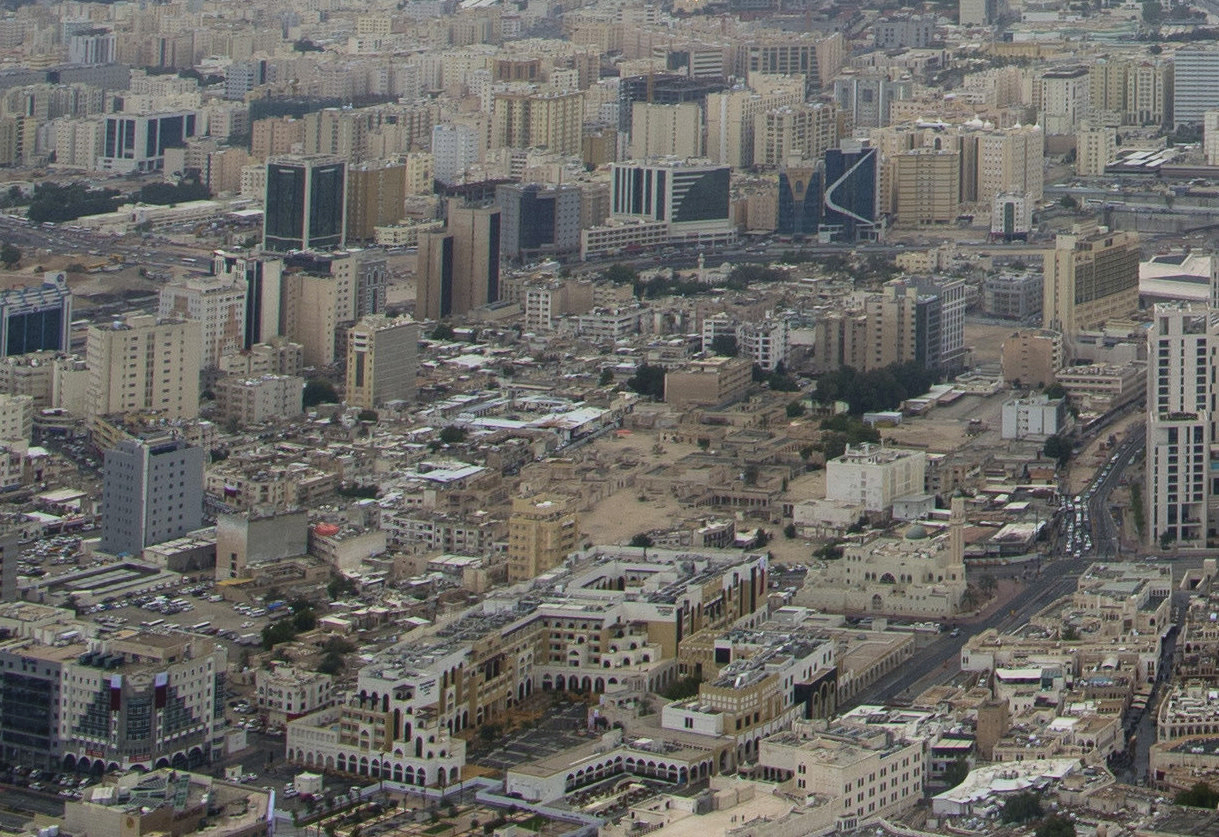
Aerial view of Musheireb in 2019.

Msheireb Downtown.

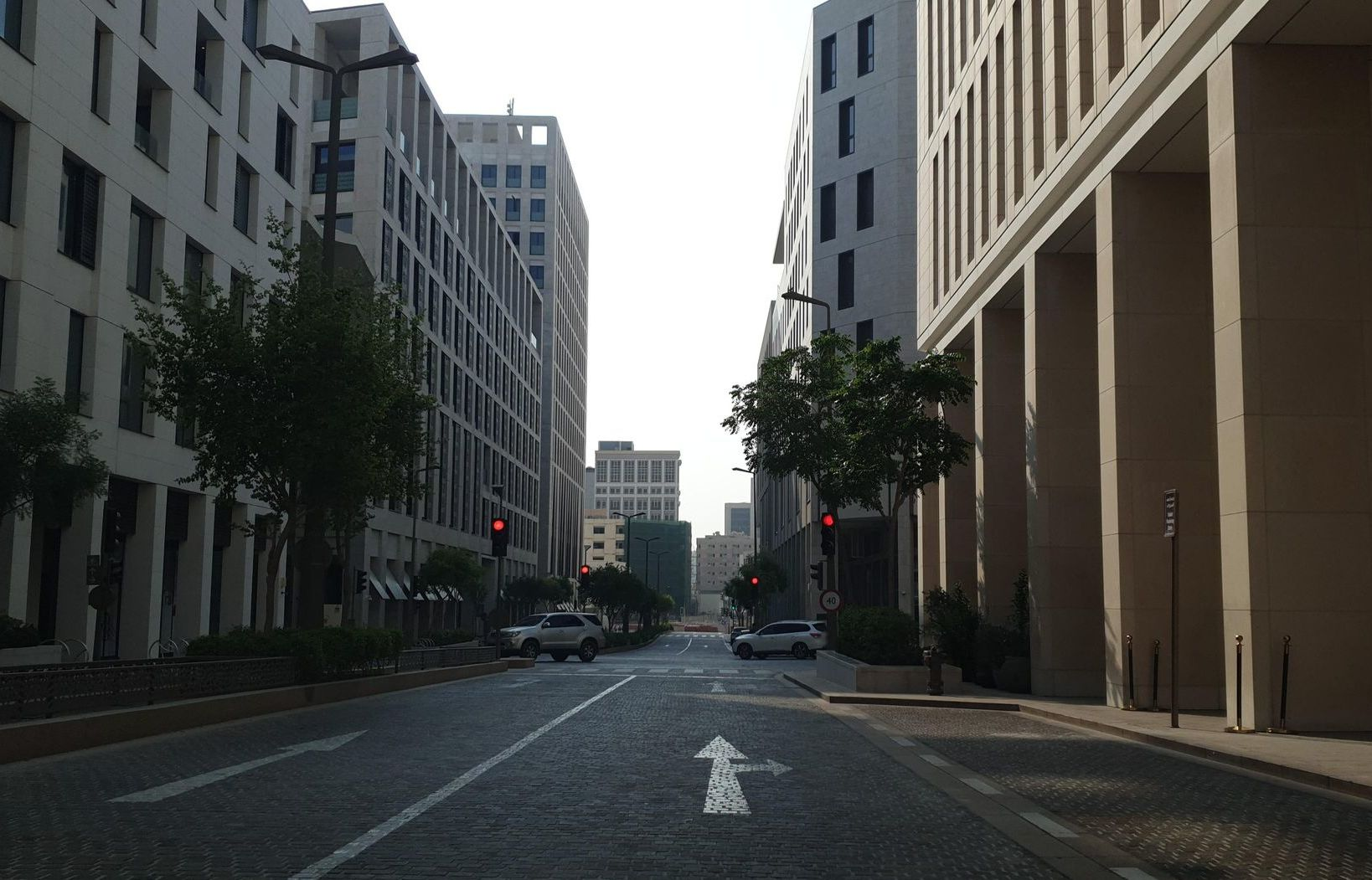
Musheireb downtown on Abdullah Bin Thani Street in 2021.

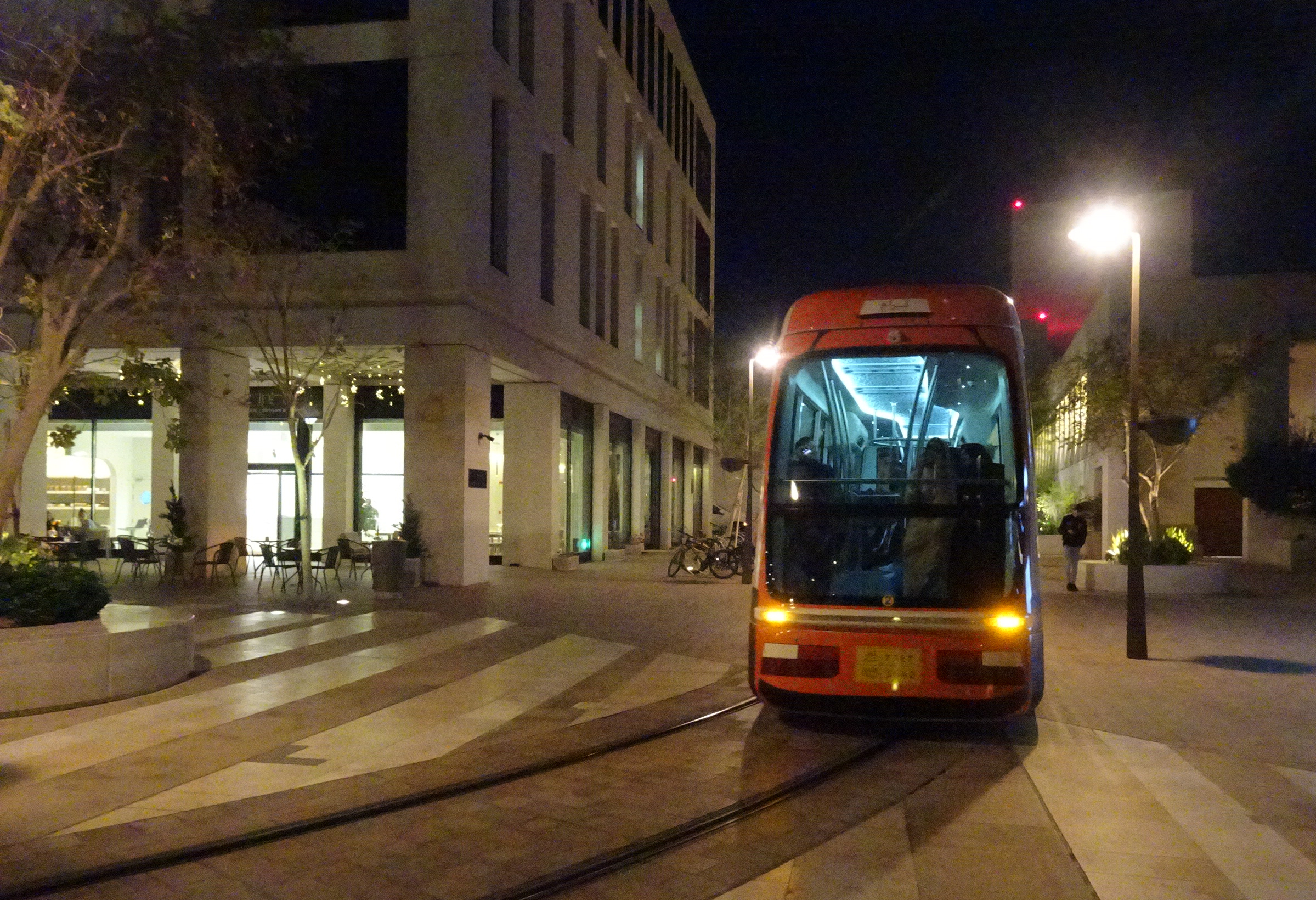
Msheireb Tram at night in Msheireb Downtown.
