= Gold Line (Doha Metro) =

Rapid transit line in Doha, Qatar

Overview
- Other name: Historic Line
- Native name: الخط الذهبي
- Status: Operating
- Owner: Government of Qatar
- Locale: Doha, Qatar
- Termini: Al Aziziyah; Ras Bu Aboud
- Stations: 11

Service
- Type: Rapid transit
- System: Doha Metro
- Operator: Qatar Rail

History
- Opened: 21 November 2019

Technical
- Line length: 14 km (8.7 mi)
- Track gauge: 1,435 mm (4 ft 8 1/2 in) standard gauge
- Electrification: 750 V DC third rail

The Gold Line is a rapid transit line of the Doha Metro. The east-west Gold Line runs through Qatar's capital city Doha, extending from Ras Bu Aboud Station to Al Aziziyah Station over a distance of 32 kilometres (20 mi). It is part of the Qatar Integrated Rail Project, which is guided by the Qatar National Vision 2030. It was officially opened on 21 November 2019.

== Stations ==
Station name		Transfers	Opening date
English	Arabic	Transfers	Opening date
Al Aziziyah	العزيزية		
Sport City	المدينة الرياضية		
Al Waab	الوعب		
Al Sudan	السودان		
Joaan	جوعان		
Al Sadd	السد		
Bin Mahmoud	بن محمود		
Msheireb	مشيرب	Red Line (Doha Metro) Green Line (Doha Metro)	
Souq Waqif	سوق واقف		
National Museum	متحف قطر الوطني		
Ras Bu Aboud	راس أبو عبود		

== Construction ==
The Gold Line metro project was awarded to an international consortium of five companies; Aktor S.A. from Greece, Larsen & Toubro Ltd from India, Yapi Merkezi and STFA from Turkey and Al Jaber Engineering from Qatar.
