= Souq Waqif =

Souq in Doha, Qatar

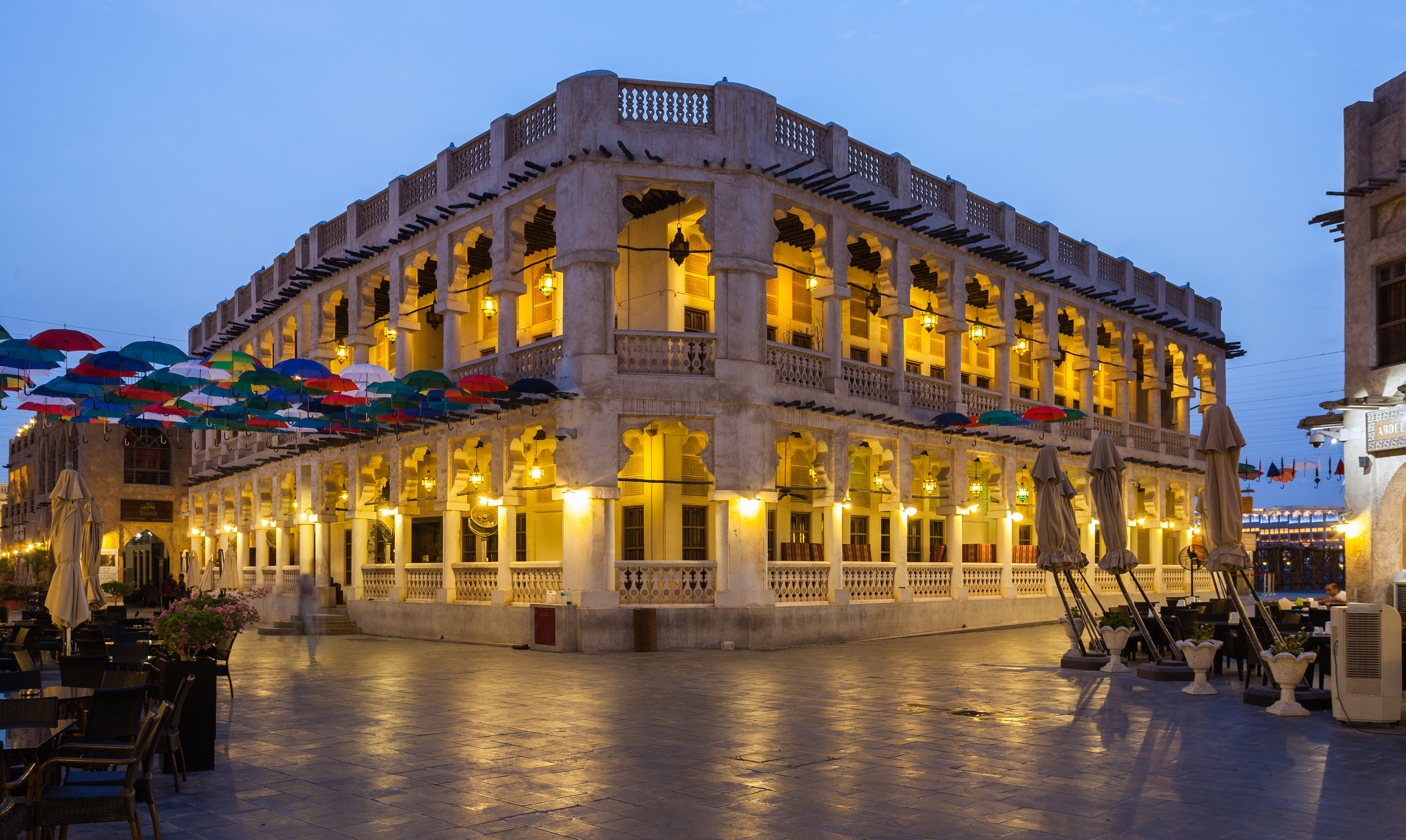
- Interactive map of Souq Waqif
- Native name: سوق واقف (Arabic)
- Location: Doha, Qatar
- Coordinates: 25°17′14.58″N 51°31′59.54″E

Construction
- Completed: Late 19th century-early 20th century

Souq Waqif (Arabic: سوق واقف, romanized: Sūq Wāqif, lit. 'the standing market') is a marketplace (souq) in Doha, the capital of Qatar. The souq sells traditional garments, spices, handicrafts, and souvenirs. It is also home to restaurants and shisha lounges. The original building is an example of traditional Qatari architecture and dates back to the late 19th or early 20th centuries. It was renovated in 2006, with the reconstruction placing an emphasis on conserving its original form.

== Location ==
It is located in the district of Al Souq, which is situated in the centre of Doha. As it was a market used for trading activities, the area used to be located immediately on the shore to allow for boats to access it from Doha Bay. Souq Waqif's position relative to the bay was significantly altered throughout the late 1950s and early 1960s due to land reclamation for the Doha Corniche, which shifted the coastline approximately 335 metres (1,099 ft) northward.

As of the 2020s, the area between the souq and the coast comprises a northern expansion of the market itself, Abdullah Bin Jassim Street, and Souq Waqif Park. The current distance from the northern edge of Souq Waqif to the coast is about 215 metres (705 ft). This space encompasses two major roadways: Abdullah Bin Jassim Street, a 20 metres (66 ft) wide four-lane road, and Al Corniche Road, a 35 metres (115 ft) wide eight-lane thoroughfare. These roads account for over a quarter of the distance between the souq and the coast; however, pedestrian access is hindered by traffic infrastructure.

== History ==
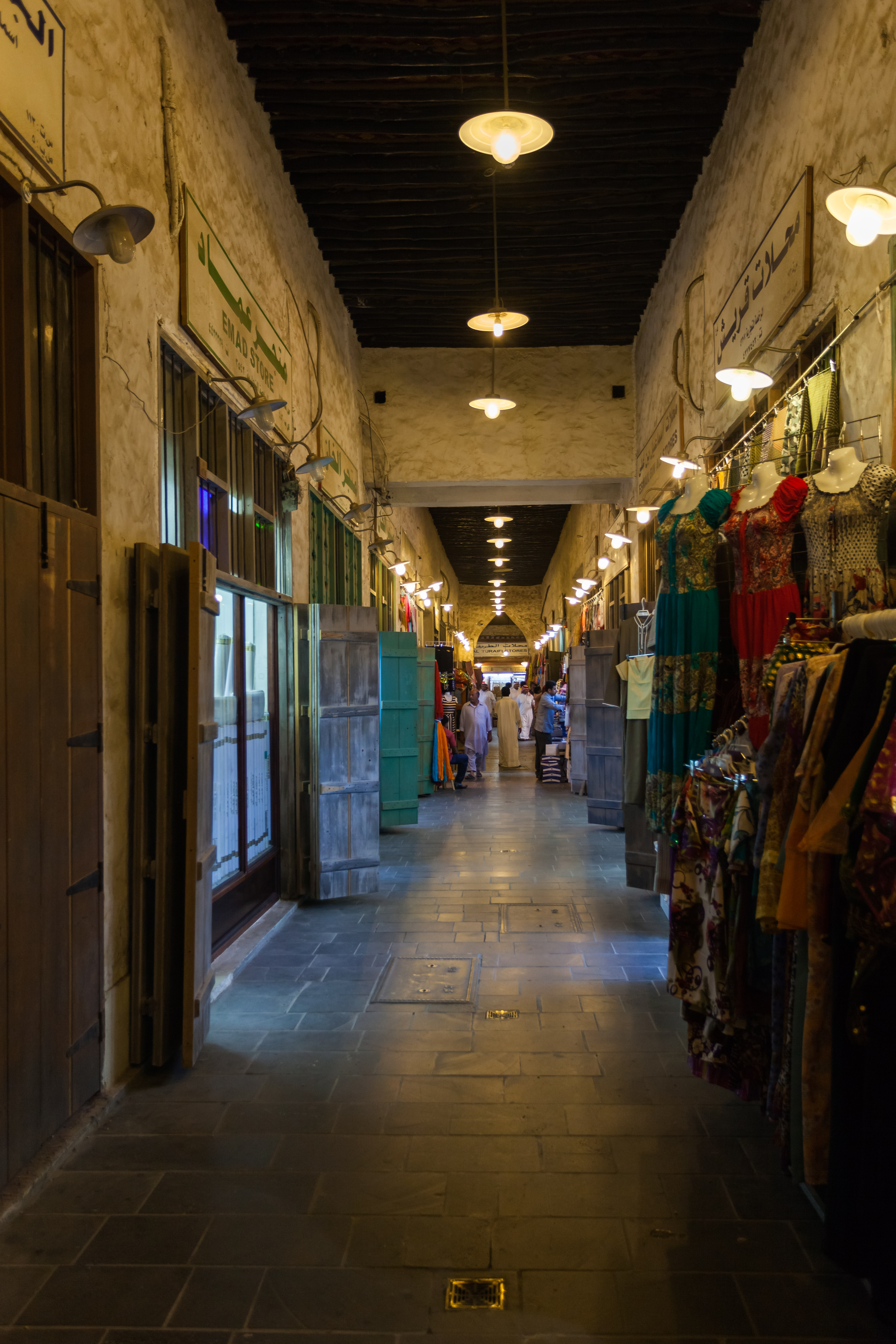
The souq comprises many narrow alleyways

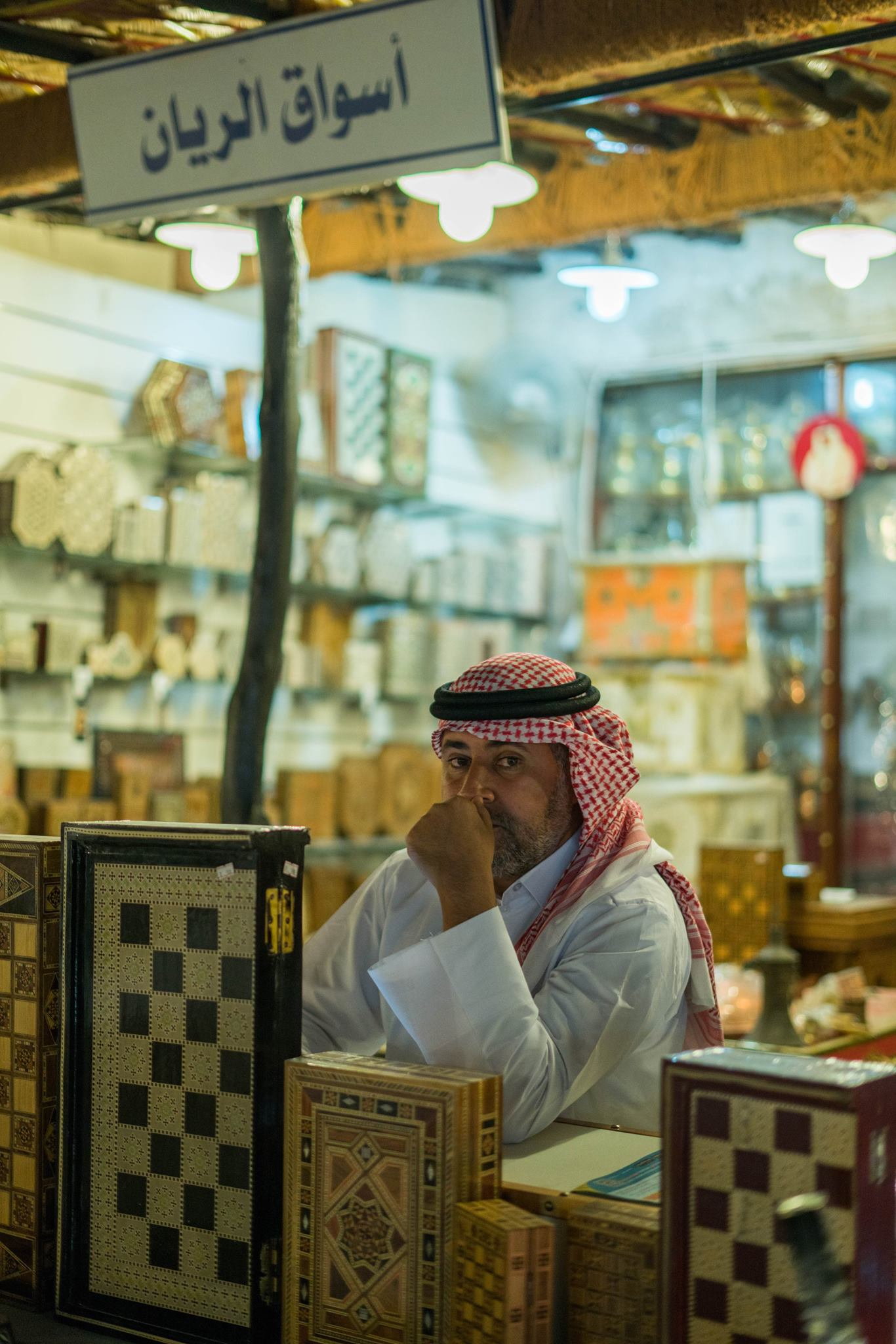
Seller in Souq Waqif

The souq was founded at least a century ago in proximity to the dry river bed known as Wadi Musheireb. The name "Souq Waqif" stems from the fact that traders used to set up shop at the gates to show off their wares. It was a gathering place where Bedouins and locals would trade a variety of goods, primarily livestock goods.

However, with the boom in prosperity in the 1990s, the souq fell into decline and in 2003, most of it was destroyed in a fire. This event initiated a restoration program by the government in 2006, with the purpose of preserving its architectural and historical identity. The first phase of restoration was funded by the Emir Sheikh Hamad bin Khalifa Al Thani and his wife Sheikha Moza bint Nasser. Buildings constructed after the 1950s were demolished whereas older structures were refurbished. The restoration was completed in 2008. Traditional heating methods are employed by utilizing wood and bamboo imported from various areas of Asia.

== Tourism and attractions ==
The Souq is a major tourist attraction in Doha.

A yearly spring festival around April hosts many theatricals, acrobatics and musical performances. An event featuring WWE wrestlers, called Souq Waqif Storm, attracted the most spectators. There was discussion over the possibility of a repeat festival.

A sharp spike in tourism took place in Souq Waqif during football events such as the 2022 FIFA World Cup and the 2023 Asian Cup. During the Asian Cup, Souq Waqif attracted many individuals from different backgrounds and nationalities, where they gathered with their countries flag and sang chants to show their support. The World Cup saw approximately double the number of visitors, with fans representing their country by bringing billboards and structures. During these events the number of tourists increased significantly, as it was the prime gathering place of fans, with celebrations running late into the night.

Souq Waqif attracts a diverse range of visitors, including residence in Doha, expats and international tourists, contubuting to its role as a place for cultural interactions in Doha.

=== Shops ===
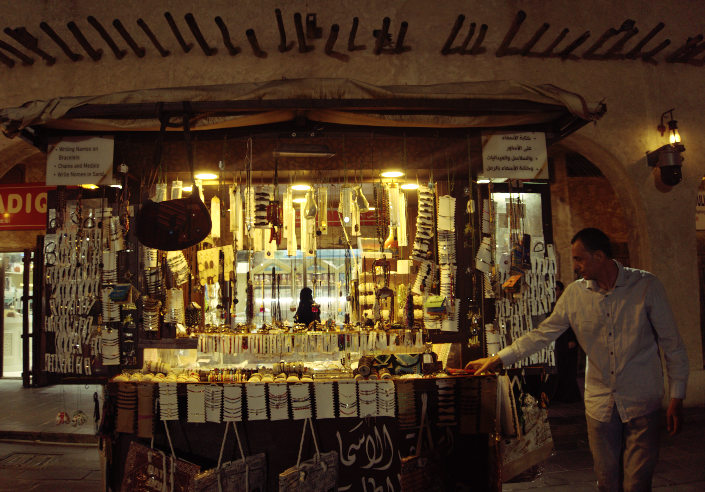
A street vendor selling women's accessories in Souq Waqif

The Souq has the first hotel that opened in Qatar named Bismillah, which was opened in the early 1900s, by a wealthy businessman named Abdullah Al Thani. The hotel has tiled balconies overlooking the Souq. The kitchenettes and living rooms in each unit are designed in the modern Arabesque style.

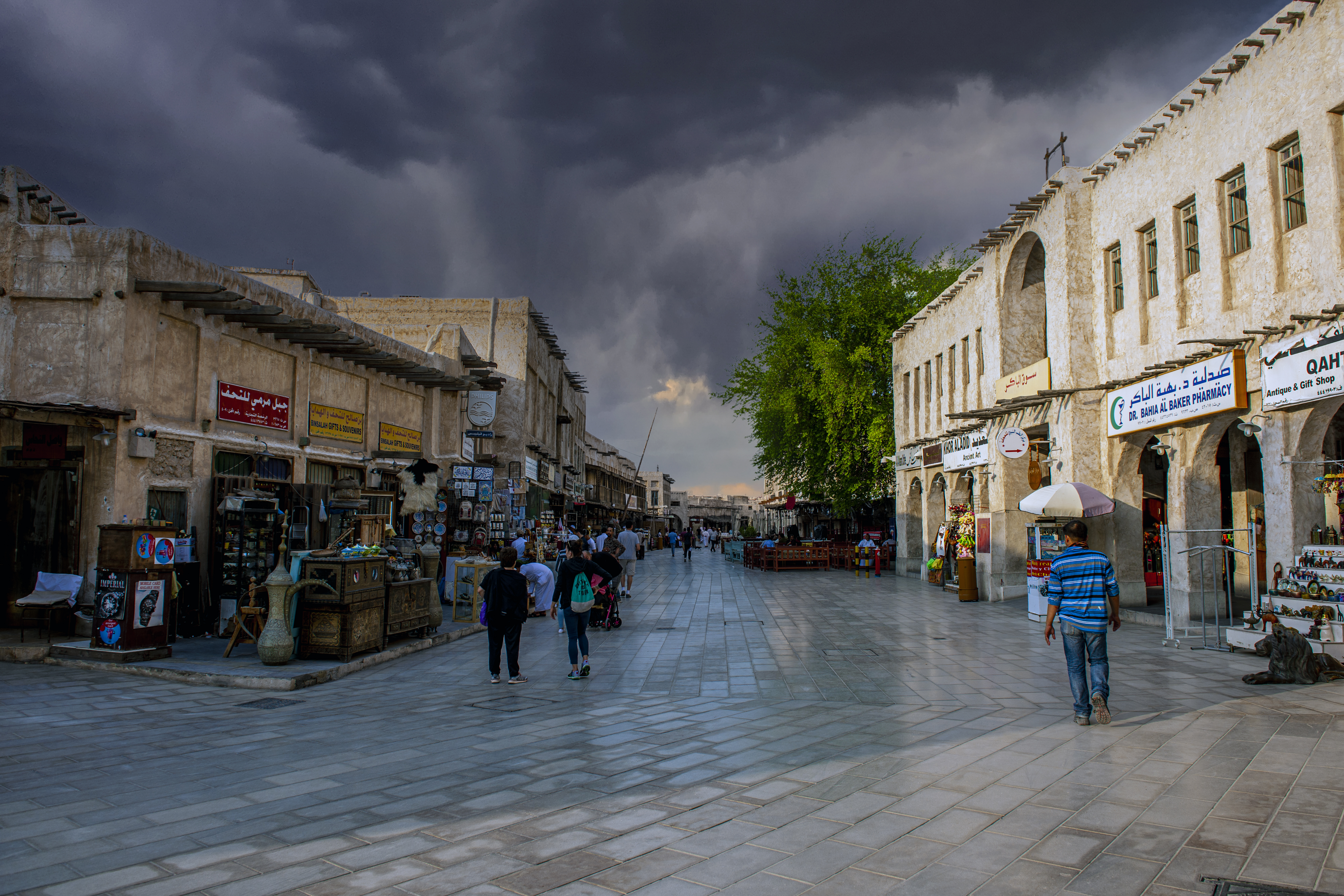
Walkway lined with shops in Souq Waqif

Alongside the boutique hotel, there are many shops around the Souq. There is a section for women, which sell traditional women clothing, perfumes and various Arabic fragrances, as well as jewellery shops which sell gold. Other than the women section the Souq has shops for men clothing, souvenirs, small supermarkets, and many family owned shops that sell traditional Qatari souvenirs. There are also many different restaurants that serve different cuisine, mostly Qatari and Middle Eastern. The Souq also sells spices, and contains a pearl shop where vistors can learn about Qatar's historic pearling industry.

=== Pet area ===
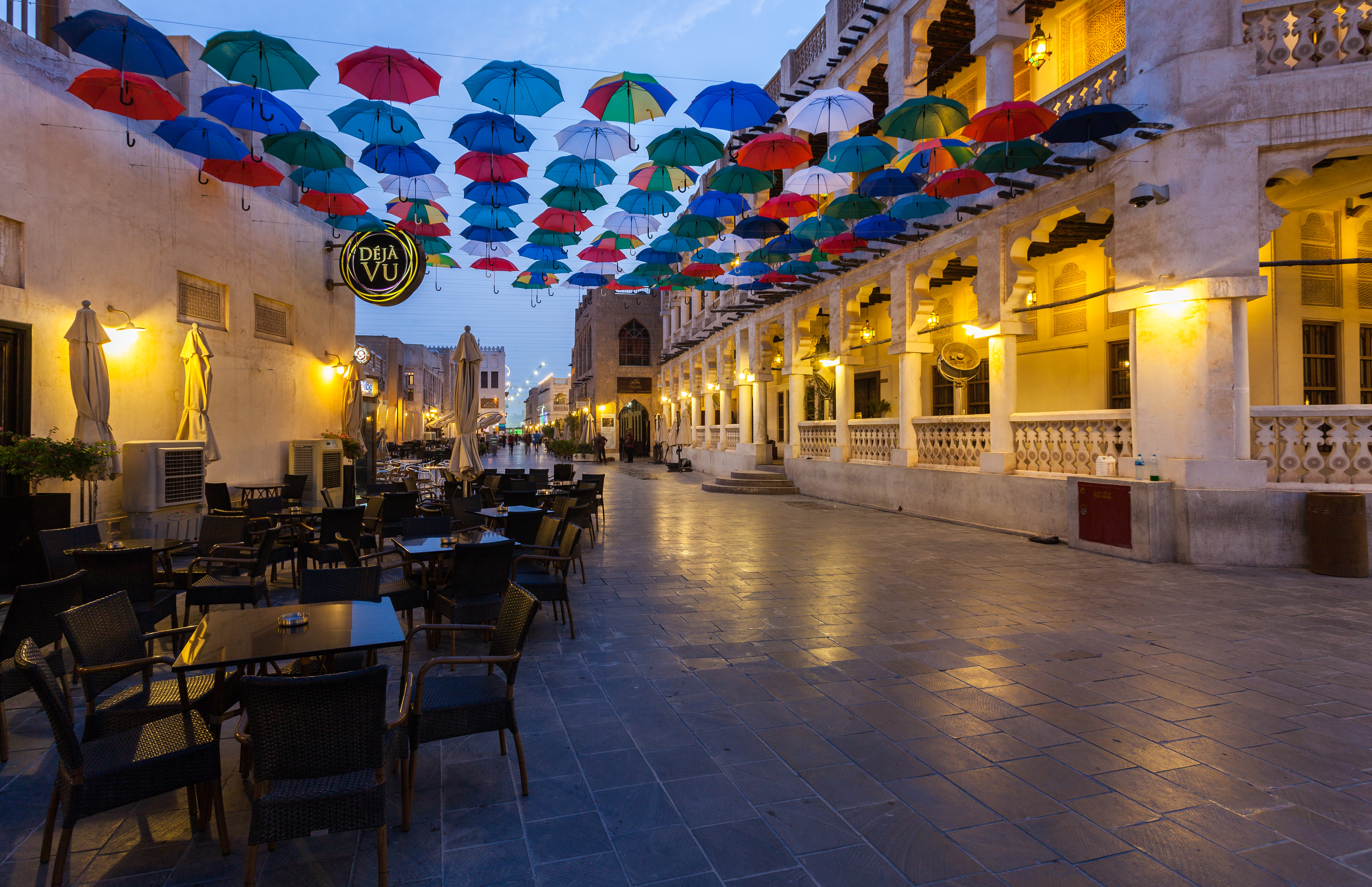
Souq Waqif

There are pet stalls in Souq Waqif which sell a variety of domestic pets, including dogs, cats, rabbits, turtles and birds. The sub-par living conditions of the pets has been the subject of advocacy campaigns in recent years, with proponents arguing that the animals suffer from a lack of proper healthcare and exposure to adverse weather conditions. Furthermore, some customers allege that stall owners falsify vaccination records. There is also a separate area in the souq reserved for falcon handling. The falcon souq, as it is called, sells not only falcons but also the needed accessories such as landing pads and GPS guidance systems for the birds.

=== Al Rayyan Theatre ===
A 980-seat indoor theatre known as Al Rayyan Theatre is located in the souq.

== See also ==
- Souq Al Wakrah
