= Ras Bu Aboud station =

Metro station in Qatar

Ras Bu Aboud metro station محطة مترو راس أبو عبود
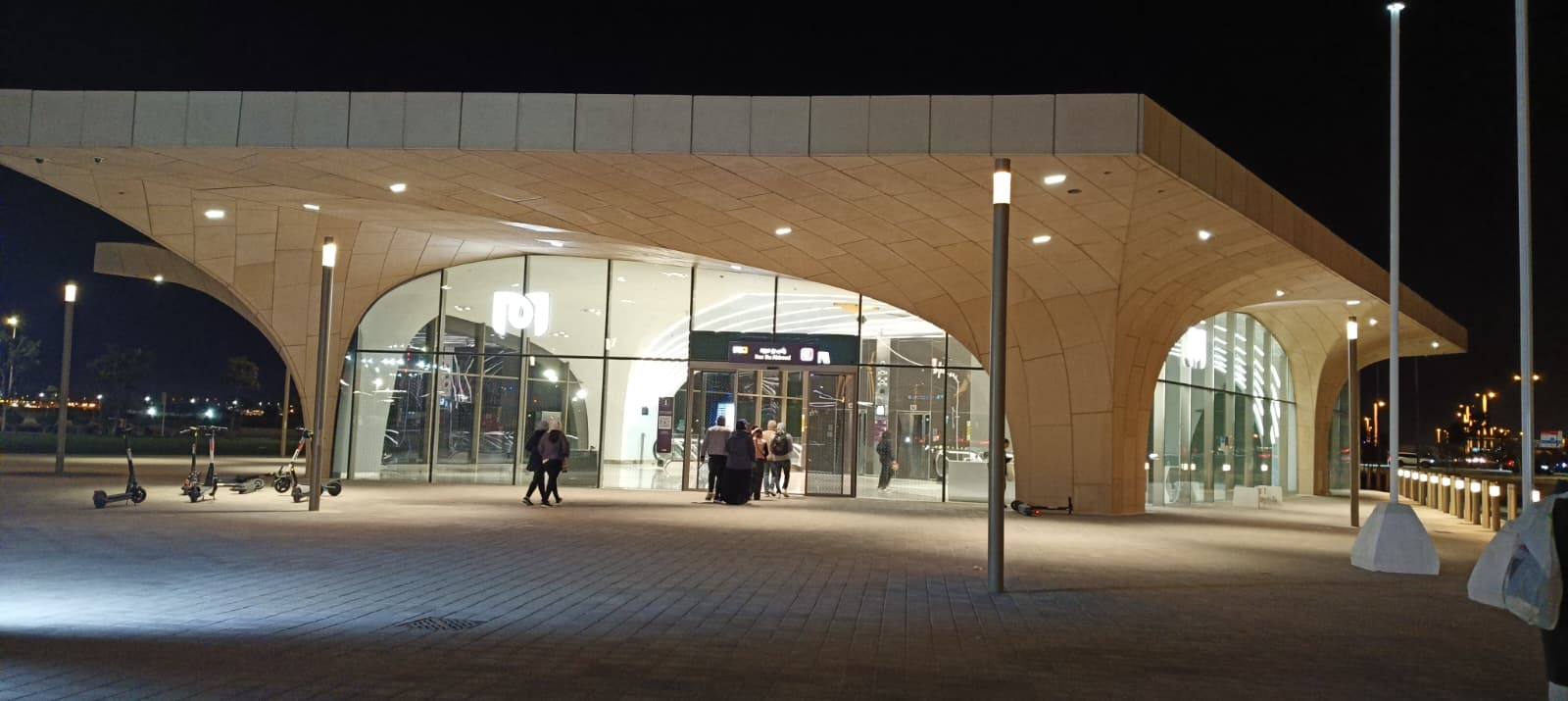

General information
- Location: Ras Abu Aboud, Doha; Qatar
- Coordinates: 25.27912°N 51.57069°E
- Owner: Qatar Rail
- Operator: Doha Metro
- Platforms: 2
- Tracks: 2

Construction
- Structure type: Underground
- Parking: Yes
- Accessible: Yes

Other information
- Website: http://www.qr.com.qa/

History
- Opened: 21 November 2019

Services
Preceding station	Doha Metro	Following station
National Museum towards Al Aziziyah	Gold Line	Terminus
Location

Ras Bu Aboud station is a station on the Doha Metro's Gold Line and serves the nearby Ras Abu Aboud district in the Qatari capital Doha.

== History ==
The station was opened to the public on 21 November 2019 along with ten other Gold Line stations, over six months after the opening of the network's first 13 stations on the Red Line.

== Station facilities ==
Facilities in the station include a prayer room and restrooms.

== Connections ==
There is one metrolink, which is the Doha Metro's free feeder bus network, servicing the station:

- M316, which serves multiple warehouses and facilities surrounding Hamad International Airport.
