= Al Aziziyah station =

Metro station in Apsire, Qatar

Al Aziziyah Metro Station محطة مترو الرفاع

General information
- Location: Aspire Zone, opposite to the Villagio Mall, Al Rayyan Municipality; Qatar
- Owner: Qatar Rail
- Operator: Doha Metro
- Platforms: 2
- Tracks: 1

Construction
- Structure type: Underground
- Accessible: Yes

Other information
- Website: www.qr.com.qa

History
- Opened: 10 December 2019

Services
Preceding station	Doha Metro	Following station
Terminus	Gold Line	Sport City towards Ras Bu Aboud
Location

Al Aziziyah station is the western terminus of the Doha Metro's Gold Line and serves the municipality of Al Rayyan, which is a part of the Doha Metropolitan Area in Qatar. The station is located on Aspire Zone, opposite the Villagio Mall.

The station currently has only 2 metrolink buses. Facilities on the premises include restrooms and a prayer room.

== History ==
The station was opened to the public on 21 November 2019 along with the other Gold Line stations.

== Connections ==
The station is served by bus routes M313, leading to Muaither, and M312, leading to Al Aziziya and Fereej Al Murra.
