= Fatma Ibrahim Al Sehlawi =

Qatari architect

- فاطمة إبراهيم السهلاوي
- Education: American University in Sharjah
- Occupations: Architect, curator, businessperson
- Known for: Establishing Atlas Bookstore

Fatma Ibrahim Al Sehlawi, in Arabic: فاطمة إبراهيم السهلاوي, is an architect, artist, curator and businesswoman. She leads The Qatar Blueprint project, a national development programme. She co-curated the exhibition Making Doha 1950-2030 at the National Museum of Qatar, which used archival material, oral history and photographs to explore the architectural history of the city.

Al Sehlawi completed her degree in Architecture from the American University in Sharjah for a duration of seven years, taking a year-long break in order to gain experience in current architecture projects.

In 2015 she co-founded Atlas Bookstore with her sister Reem, based on their personal book collections. It is both a shop and a reading room and specialises in works relating to both urbanism and the natural world in western Asia and northern Africa.

The organisation also undertakes research into urban planning in the Arab world. The sisters' work as artists was featured in re:collection in 2022 at The Gallery at VCUarts Qatar. The same year she collaborated with British-Pakistani artist Shezad Dawood to create the Doha Modern Playground in Al Masrah Park. Designed as a playspace for children, its design was inspired by modernist buildings in the country, including Qatar Post, Qatar University, the Sheraton Grand Doha Resort & Convention Hotel, Qatar National Theatre and the Qatar Ministry of Information building.

Prior to this, in 2017, she collaborated with ceramicist Xeina Malki to recreate Qatari buildings for an exhibition at Vitra Design Museum in Weil am Rhein. The same year that she established her architectural practice Studio Imara. In 2025 her photography featured in the Qatar Pavilion at Expo 2025 Osaka.
