= Venues of the 2006 Asian Games =

Khalifa Stadium, the main venue of the games

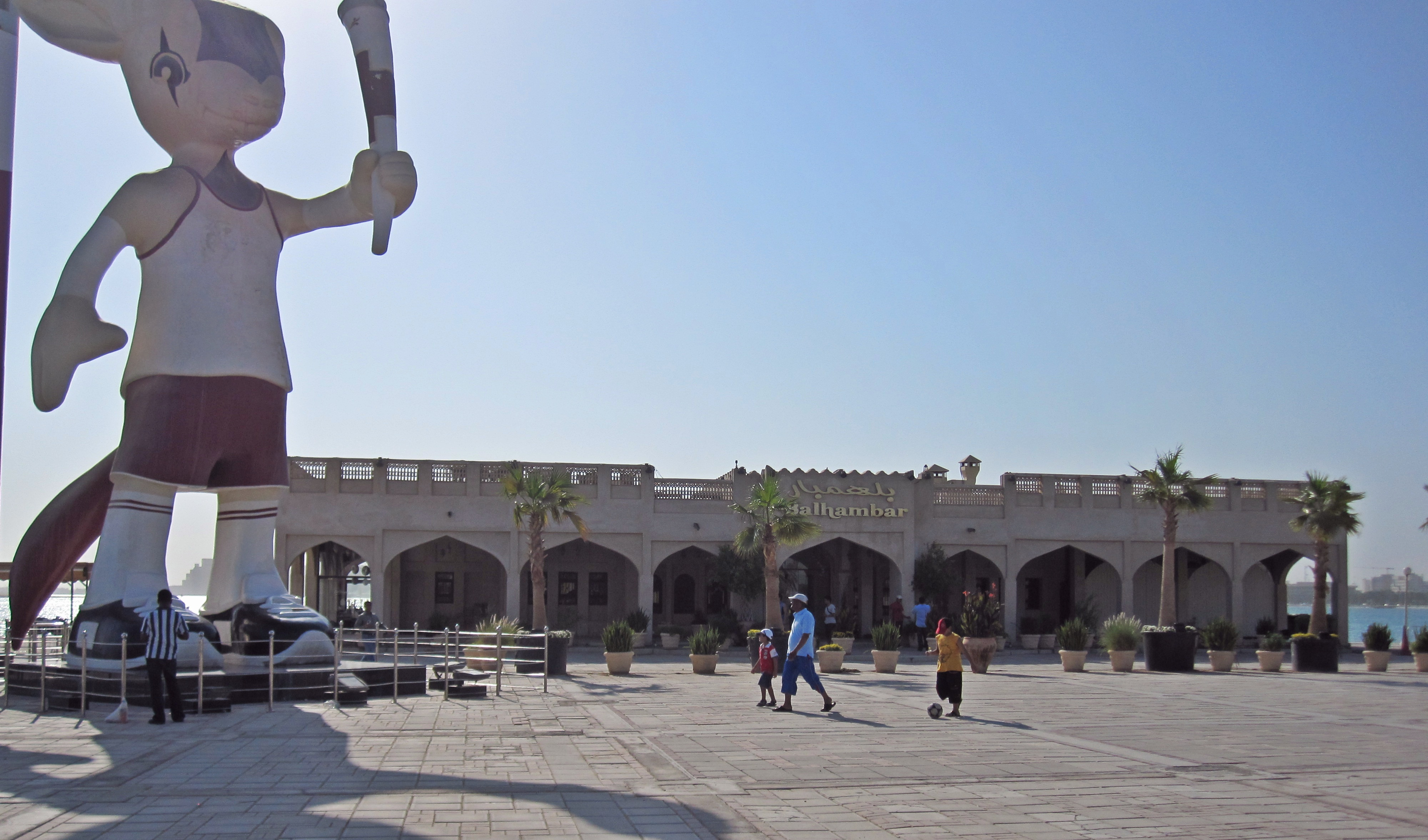
A giant statue of Orry in the Doha Corniche

The Aspire Dome hosted the multi events during the games.

The 2006 Asian Games featured 21 competition venues.

== Venues ==
=== The Sports City ===
Venue	Events	Capacity	Ref.
Khalifa International Stadium	Athletics, opening and closing ceremonies	50, 000	
Hamad Aquatic Centre	Aquatics (Diving, swimming, synchronised swimming)	2,000	
ASPIRE Academy for Sports Excellence	Cycling (Track) (Hall 1)		
ASPIRE Academy for Sports Excellence	Gymnastics (Artistic, Rhythmic, Trampoline) (Hall 2)		
ASPIRE Academy for Sports Excellence	Badminton, Wushu (Hall 3)		
ASPIRE Academy for Sports Excellence	Kabaddi, Wrestling (Hall 4)		
ASPIRE Academy for Sports Excellence	Boxing (Hall 5)		
Basketball Indoor Hall	Basketball	2,000	
Temporary venue	Equestrian (Eventing: Cross-country), Volleyball (beach)	1,500	

=== Others ===
Venue	Events	Capacity	Ref.
Al-Arabi Sports Club	Football, Rugby sevens (Stadium)	13,000	
Al-Arabi Sports Club	Fencing, Table tennis (Indoor hall)		
Al-Dana Club	Chess (Indoor hall)	500	
Al-Dana Club	Bodybuilding, weightlifting (Banquet hall)	1,000	
Al-Gharrafa Sports Club	Football (Stadium)	25,000	
Al-Gharrafa Sports Club	Handball (Indoor hall)	3,000	
Al-Rayyan Sports Club	Baseball, Softball (Baseball and softball venue)		
Al-Rayyan Sports Club	Football (Stadium)	25,000	
Al-Rayyan Sports Club	Field hockey (Hockey field)		
Al-Rayyan Sports Club	Volleyball (Indoor) (Indoor hall)	3,000	
Al-Sadd Sports Club	Football (Stadium)	12,000	
Al-Sadd Sports Club	Cue sports (Multi-purpose hall)	1,000	
Al-Sadd Sports Club	Sepak takraw (Indoor hall)	1,000	
Al-Sadd Sports Club	Aquatics (Water polo) (Aquatic centre)	1,000	
Qatar Sports Club	Football (Stadium)	12,500	
Qatar Sports Club	Judo, Karate, Taekwondo (Indoor hall)	1,050	
Doha Corniche	Cycling (Road), Athletics (Marathons, Race walking), Triathlon	---	
Khalifa International Tennis and Squash Complex	Soft Tennis, Squash, Tennis	4,106 (tennis center court ) 1,000 (Squash)	
Lusail Shooting Complex	Archery, Shooting	1,500 (Archery) 600 (Shooting)	
West Bay Lagoon	Canoeing (Canoe, Kayak), Rowing	500	
Al-Khor Road Course	Cycling (Time trial)	---	
Doha Golf Club	Golf	---	
Doha Racing & Equestrian Club	Equestrian (Dressage, Jumping, Eventing: Dressage and Jumping)	1,050	
Doha Sailing Club	Sailing	----	
Mesaieed Endurance Course	Equestrian (Endurance)	500	
Qatar Bowling Centre	Bowling	350	
