= Shezad Dawood =

British visual artist (born 1974)

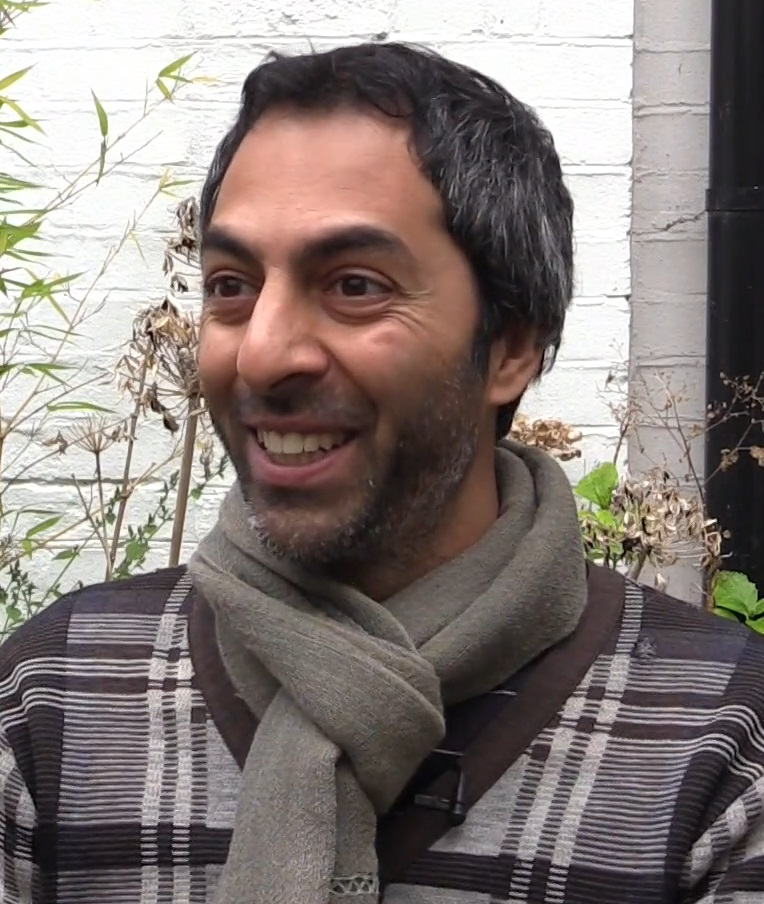
Shezad Dawood 2014

Shezad Dawood (born 1974) is a British visual artist. He is based in London.

== Biography ==
Shezad Dawood was born in 1974, in London, England. His artworks reflect his varied cultural heritage, which includes having a Pakistani mother, an Indian father, and an Irish stepmother.

Dawood trained at Central Saint Martins and received his MA degree from the Royal College of Art in 2000, before undertaking a PhD from the School of Arts at Leeds Metropolitan University (now Leeds Beckett University) in 2008 (Fine Art), his thesis was titled 'The killing of Chief Crazy Horse: a metaphorical allegory in 3 parts'. He was a research fellow in experimental media at the University of Westminster.

Dawood works across the disciplines of painting, film, neon, sculpture, performance, virtual reality and other digital media to ask key questions of narrative, history and embodiment. In 2017 he collaborated with Qatari architect Fatma Ibrahim Al Sehlawi to create the Doha Modern Playground in Al Masrah Park. Designed as a playspace for children, its design was inspired by modernist buildings in the country, including Qatar Post, Qatar University, the Sheraton Grand Doha Resort & Convention Hotel, Qatar National Theatre and the Qatar Ministry of Information building.

== Publications ==
- Making New Time: Sharjah Biennial 14: Leaving the Echo Chamber, Omar Kholeif (ed.), Prestel, Munich, Germany, 2019. ISBN 978-3791358499
- Artists' Moving Image in Britain since 1989, Erika Balsam, Lucy Reynolds and Sarah Perks (eds.), Paul Mellon Centre for Studies in British Art; London, 2019. ISBN 978-1-913107-01-7
- Shezad Dawood: Kalimpong, Camilla Palestra (ed.), Sternberg Press and Timothy Taylor, London, 2016. ISBN 978-3-95679-276-2
- It was a time that was a time, Gabriel Florenz and David Everitt Howe (eds.). Pioneer Works, New York, 2015. ISBN 978-0-9905935-6-0
- The Great Acceleration – Taipei Biennial 2014, Jo Hsiao (ed.), Taipei Fine Arts Museum, Taipei, Taiwan, 2014. ISBN 978-9860444438
- Shezad Dawood: Towards the Possible Film, Ziba Ardalan (ed.), Parasol unit foundation for contemporary art, London, 2014. ISBN 9780957351820
- Black Sun, Gerrie van Noord (ed.). Ridinghouse in association with Devi Art Foundation and Arnolfini, 2013. ISBN 978-1-905464-845
- Piercing Brightness, Gerrie van Noord (ed.), Koenig Books, London, 2012. ISBN 978-3-86335-146-5
