= Sheraton Grand Doha Resort & Convention Hotel =

Five-star hotel and resort in Doha, Qatar

- فندق الشيراتون
- Interactive map of the Sheraton Grand Doha Resort & Convention Hotel area

General information
- Coordinates: 25.3192°N 51.5361°E
- Opened: 1982
- Cost: $100 million USD

Other information
- Number of rooms: 371
- Number of restaurants: 9

The Sheraton Grand Doha Resort & Convention Hotel is a five-star luxury hotel run by the Sheraton Hotels and Resorts overlooking the Persian Gulf in the West Bay area of Doha, Qatar. Located about two miles northwest of the port area, it reportedly covers an area of around 10,000 square metres. The hotel reportedly cost around $100 million to build, and although built by an American company, it was subsidized by the Qatari government.

The hotel has 371 rooms, nine restaurants, and 26 conference rooms. In 2020, it was host to the Doha peace conference that negotiated the withdrawal of U.S. troops from Afghanistan.

== History ==
The Sheraton Hotel was inaugurated on 22 February 1982 in a ceremony attended by Qatar's ruler, Sheikh Khalifa bin Hamad Al Thani, and aired on national television. The building was planned by American architect William Pereira and built on a specially created island formed from reclaimed land. Contrasting sharply with the governmental buildings, its construction involved advanced techniques, and its grand atrium, known as 'the majlis,' served as a social gathering space. The Sheraton was widely recognized as a symbol of the Doha Corniche's development. It also catalyzed the creation of a new central business district called Al Dafna, also built on dredged land, in the 1980s.

== Events ==
It is noted for its distinct pyramid shape and is part of the conference facility for the Organization of Arab States. The Sheraton Doha has been described as having "a world of Arabian luxury and magical ambience". The hotel itself is an important conference centre in Doha and regularly hosts events. Among these are international scientific seminars and meetings, such as the First Conference for Expatriate Arab Scientists, QFIRST, in 2007. It has hosted meetings of the World Trade Organization (WTO). The hotel's auditorium can holds more than 1000 people.

The shape was drawn on by British-Pakistani artist Shezad Dawood and Qatari architect Fatma Ibrahim Al Sehlawi to create the Doha Modern Playground in Al Masrah Park.

== Gallery ==
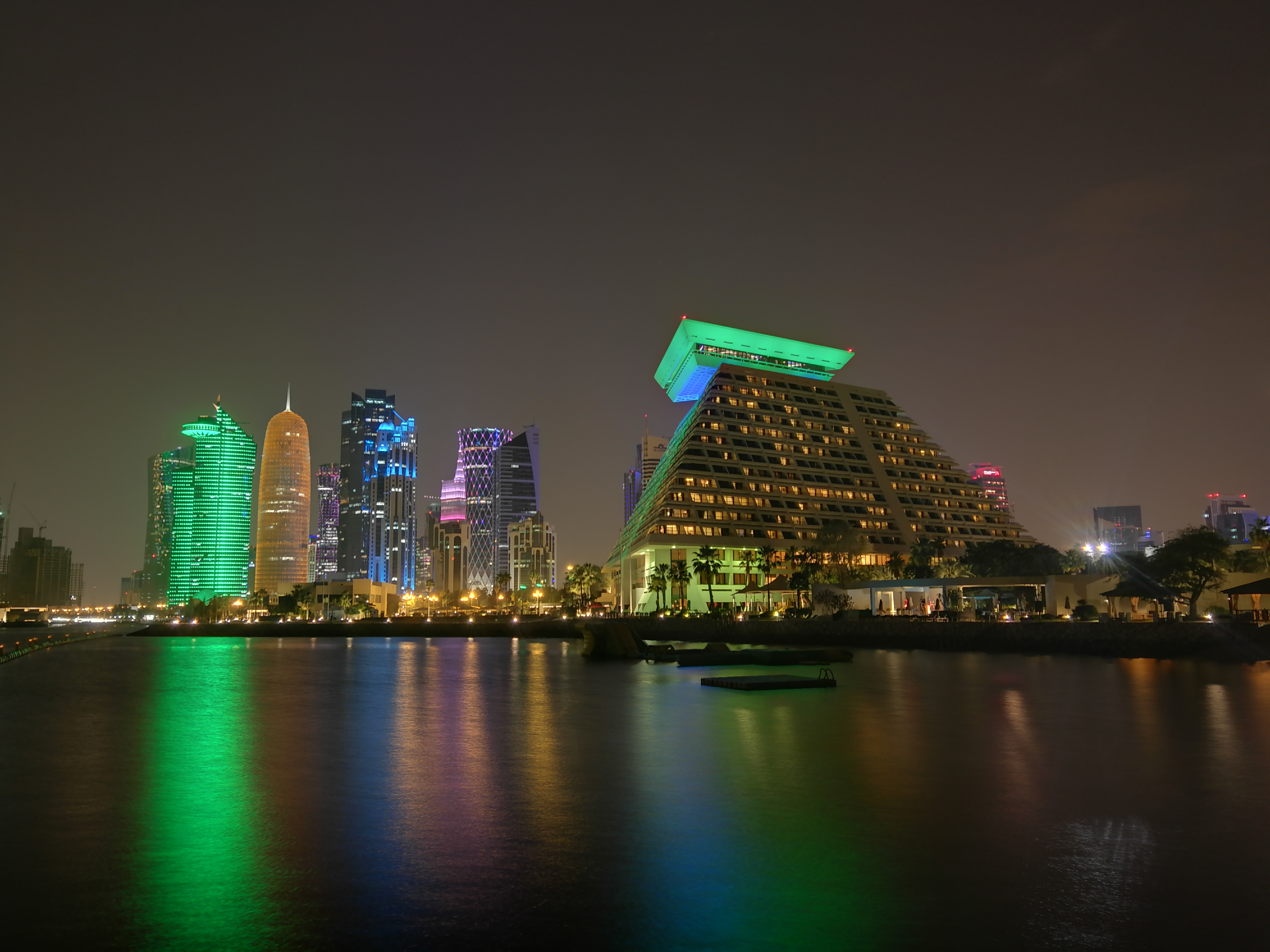
View of Sheraton Hotel

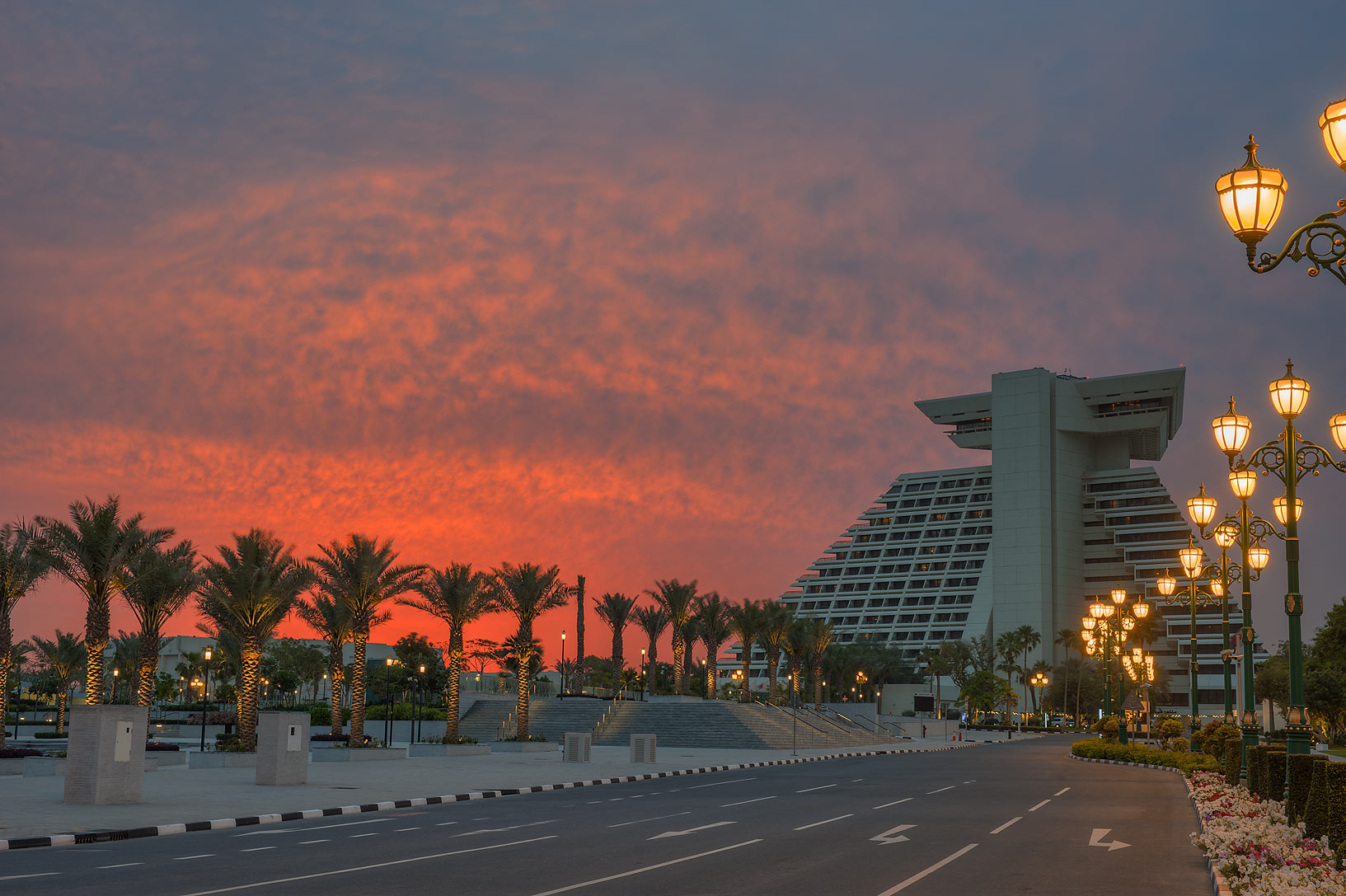
Entrance to the Sheraton Hotel

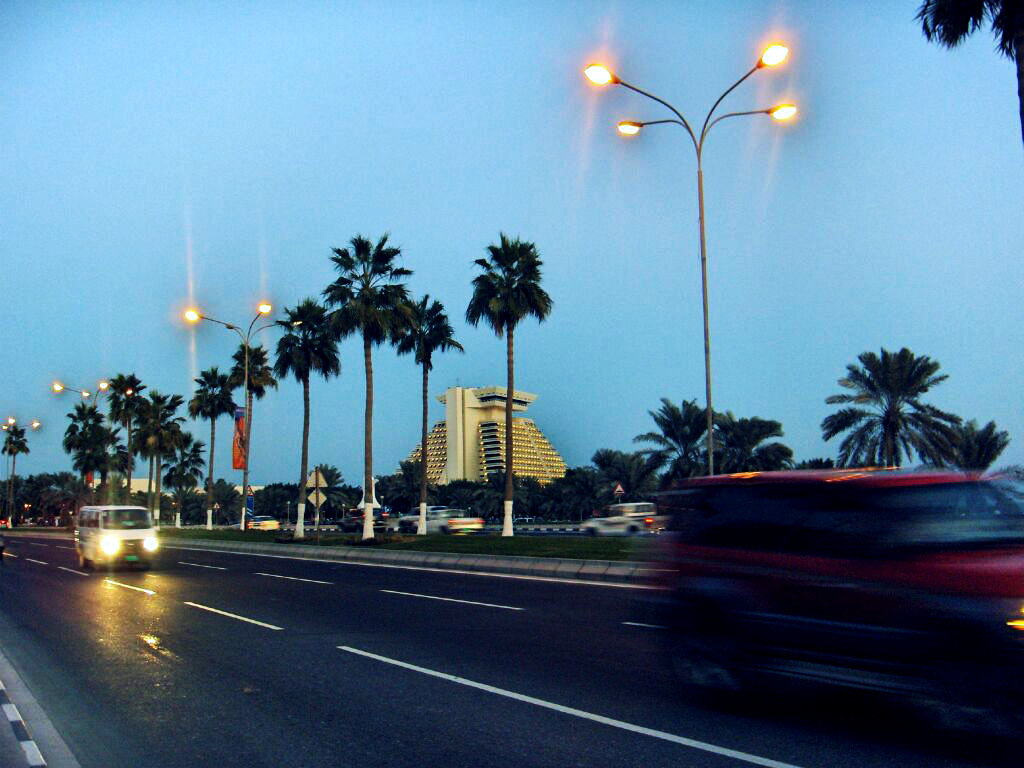
View of Sheraton Hotel

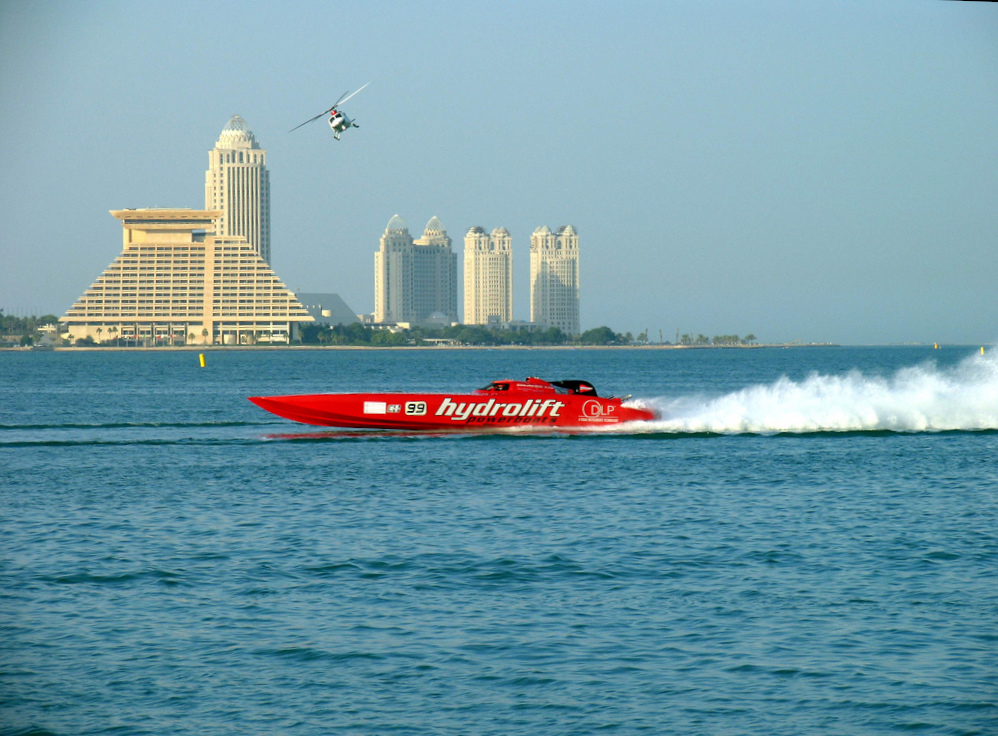
View of Sheraton Hotel

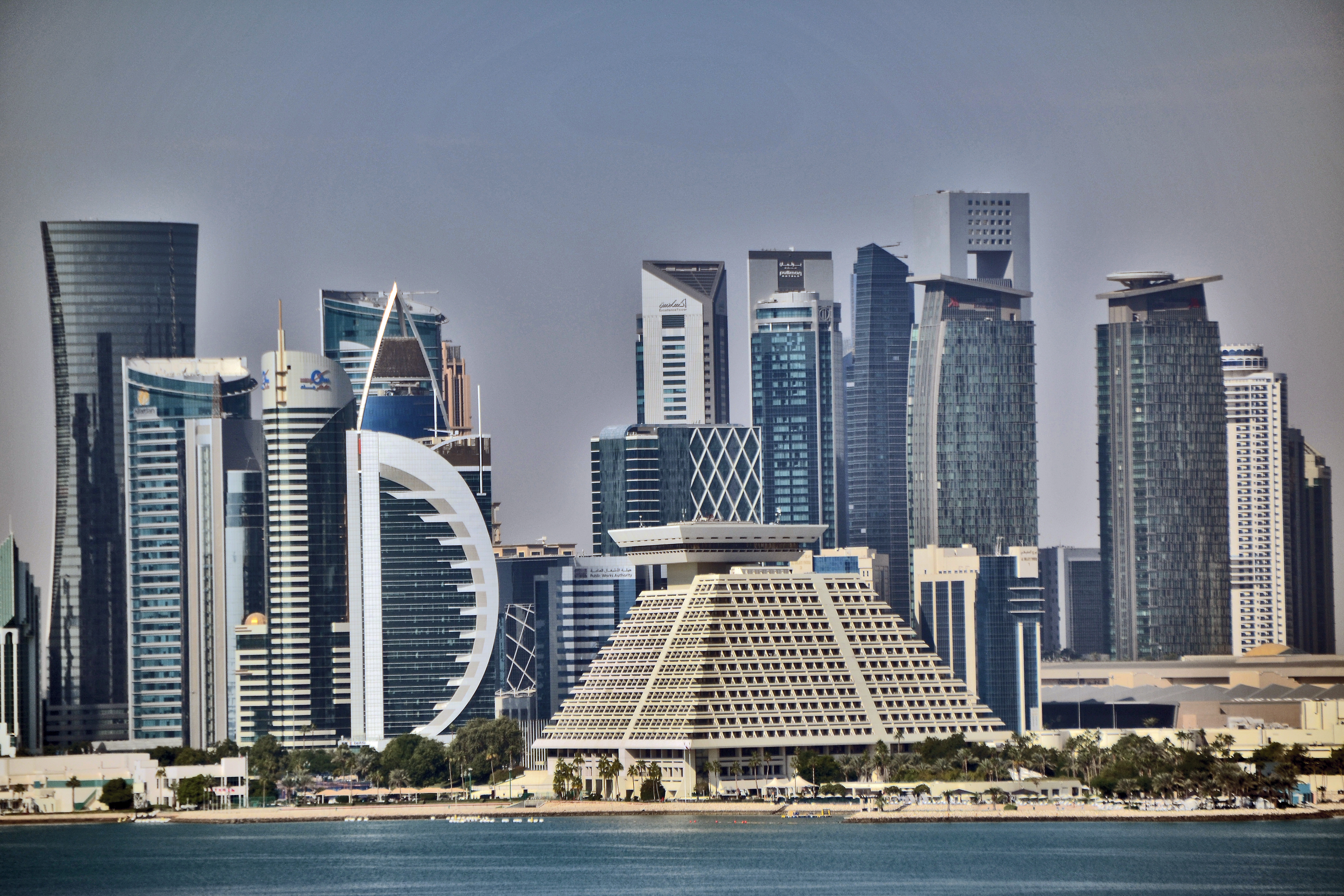
View from the harbor
