= Al Bidda Park =

Park in Doha, Qatar

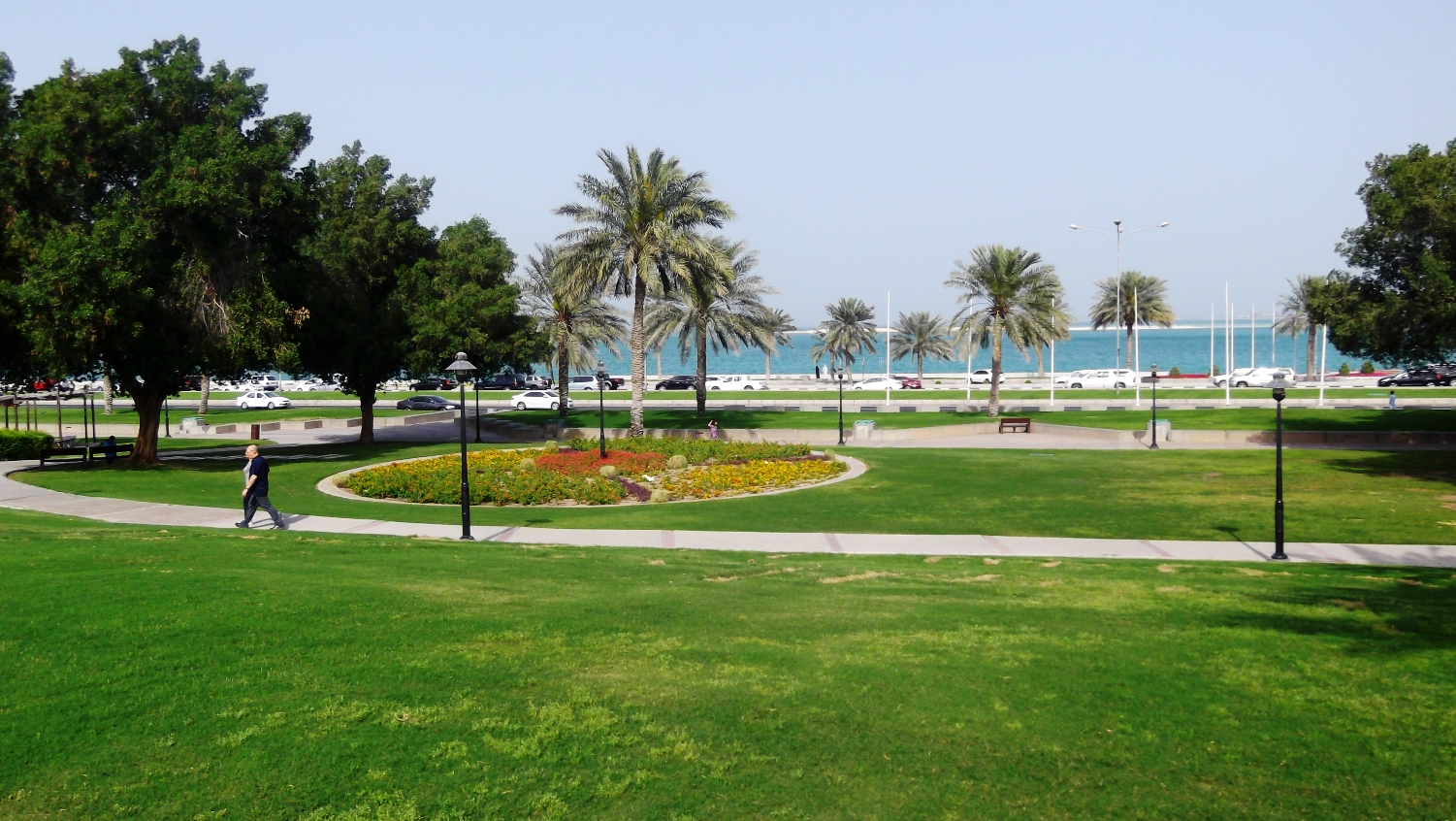
- Al Bidda Park in 2013
- Interactive map of Al Bidda Park
- Type: Public park
- Location: Doha, Qatar
- Coordinates: 25°18′03″N 51°31′03″E
- Area: 464 acres (188 ha)
- Created: c. 1990s
- Status: Open year round
- Website: albiddapark.com

Al Bidda Park, formerly known as Al Rumaila Park, is a park located on Corniche Street in Doha, Qatar next to Qatar National Theater. It is near Doha Bay, overlooks the Doha Corniche and is one of the earliest and most popular parks in Doha. It is also a popular area for birdwatching. The park includes a children's playground, small shops, a cultural village, and a cultural heritage center.

The park was created in the 1990s. After being closed for renovations in November 2014, the park was reopened in February 2018 in commemoration of National Sports Day.
