= Doha Bay =

Coordinates: 25.305°N 51.538°E

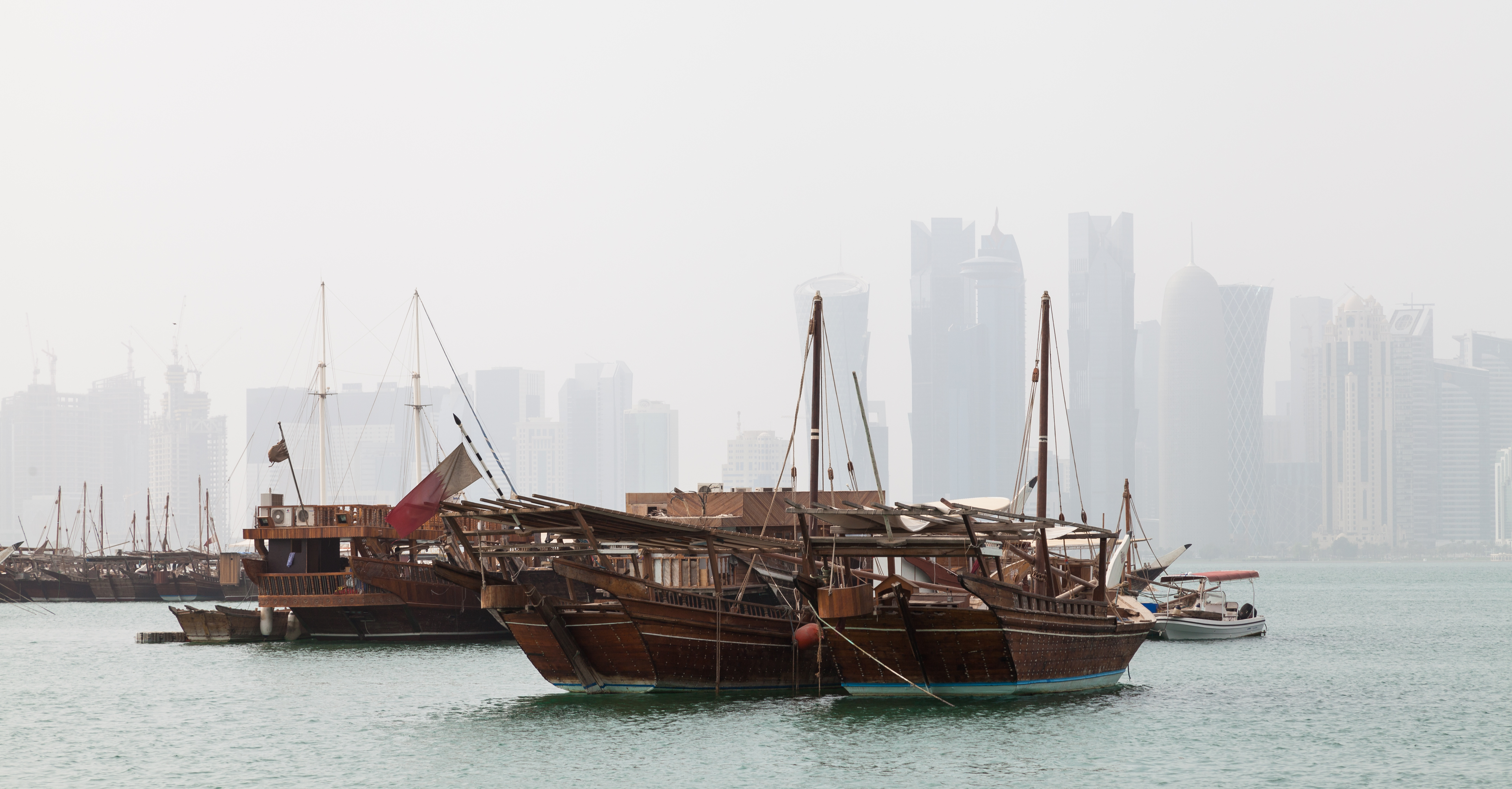
Doha Bay with the capital city of Doha in the background

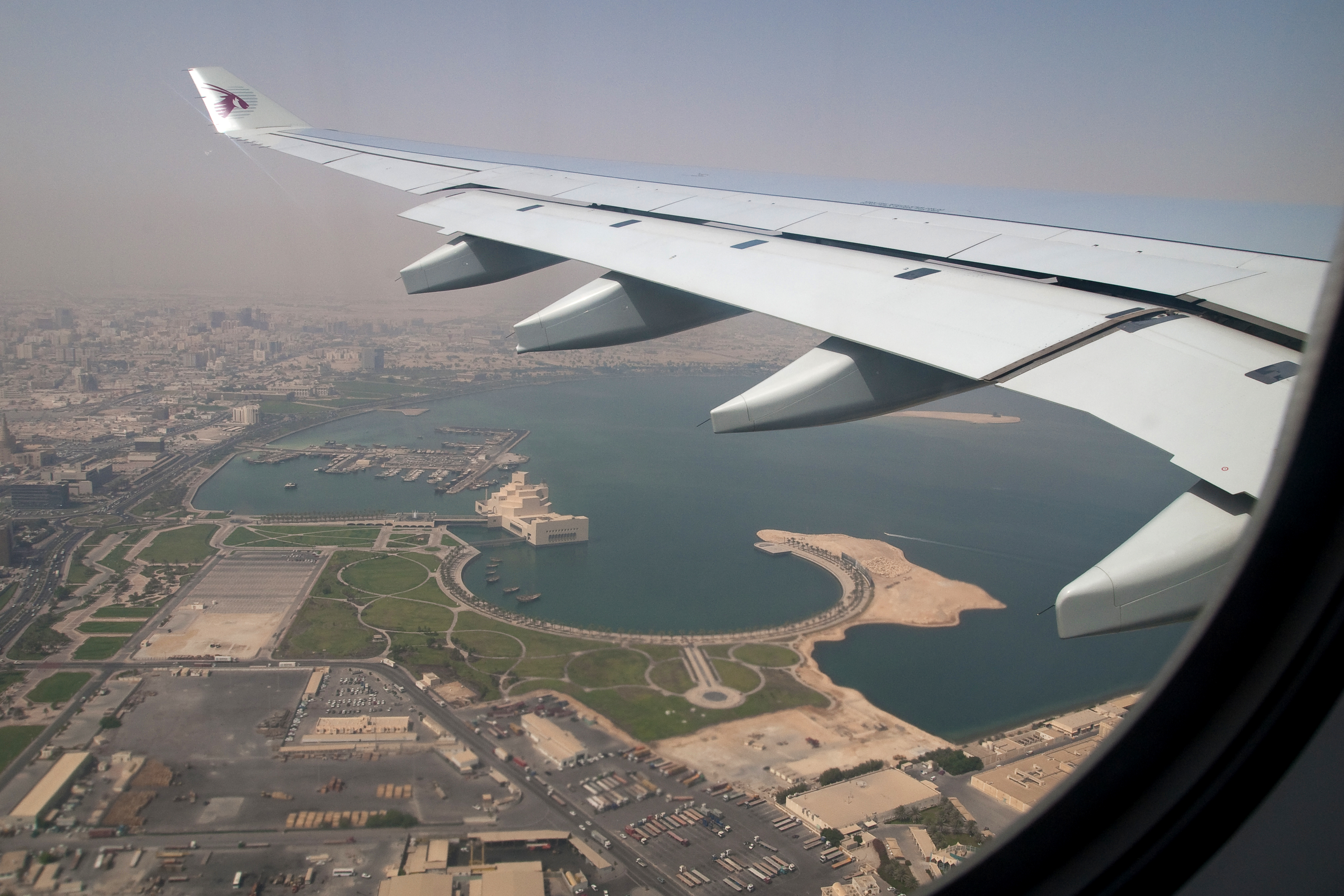
View over Doha Bay from above

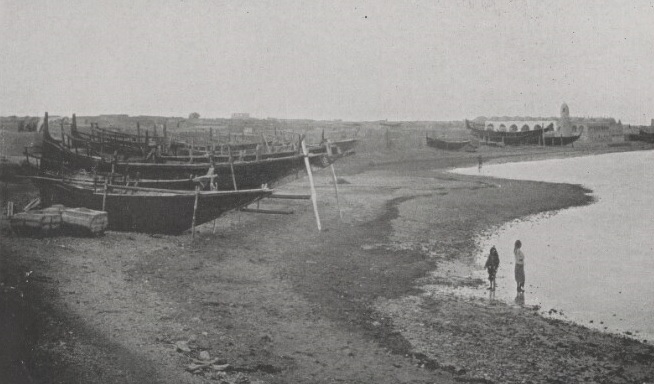
View of Doha in the early 20th century

Doha Bay is the semicircular bay bordering Qatar's capital city, Doha. The city was established on the south bank of the bay. Landfill has been used to extend and expand the city to the north around the edge of the bay. Doha Port, Corniche Street and the Doha Corniche, Al Rumaila Park and Sheraton Park border the bay. Palm Tree Island is located in the center of the bay.

== Description ==
Cruise ships berthed in the port of Doha

The United States Hydrographic Office offered a brief description of the bay in 1920: "The shore of the bay from Al Bida turns northward, and is fronted by an extensive reef running out nearly 1¾ miles, which nearly dries. Between this reef and [the island of] Jazirat as Safla is a narrow channel leading into a basin westward of that island, with from 1½ to 3½ fathoms water."

== Sharq Crossing ==
In 2011, the Sharq Crossing project (formerly known as Doha Bay Crossing) was announced by the Ministry of Municipal Affairs and Urban Planning. Overseen by Ashghal (Public Works Authority), the project plans to construct three interconnected bridges, designed by Santiago Calatrava, over a 10 km crossing connecting West Bay with Hamad International Airport. There will also be two tunnels below the bay. The purpose behind launching the Sharq Crossing programme was to accommodate the rising traffic in Doha and as a preparatory project for the 2022 FIFA World Cup.

In January 2015, a delay in the $12 billion project was reported. The financial strain of low oil prices may have been part of the reason for the delay; meanwhile $140 billion had been allocated for other infrastructure ahead of the World Cup event. The project had been put on hold until 2025, when it was announced that the project will be revived. If construction starts, the project will be complete by 2028.
