= Doha Corniche =

Waterfront promenade in Doha, Qatar

Coordinates: 25°17′29″N 51°32′14″E

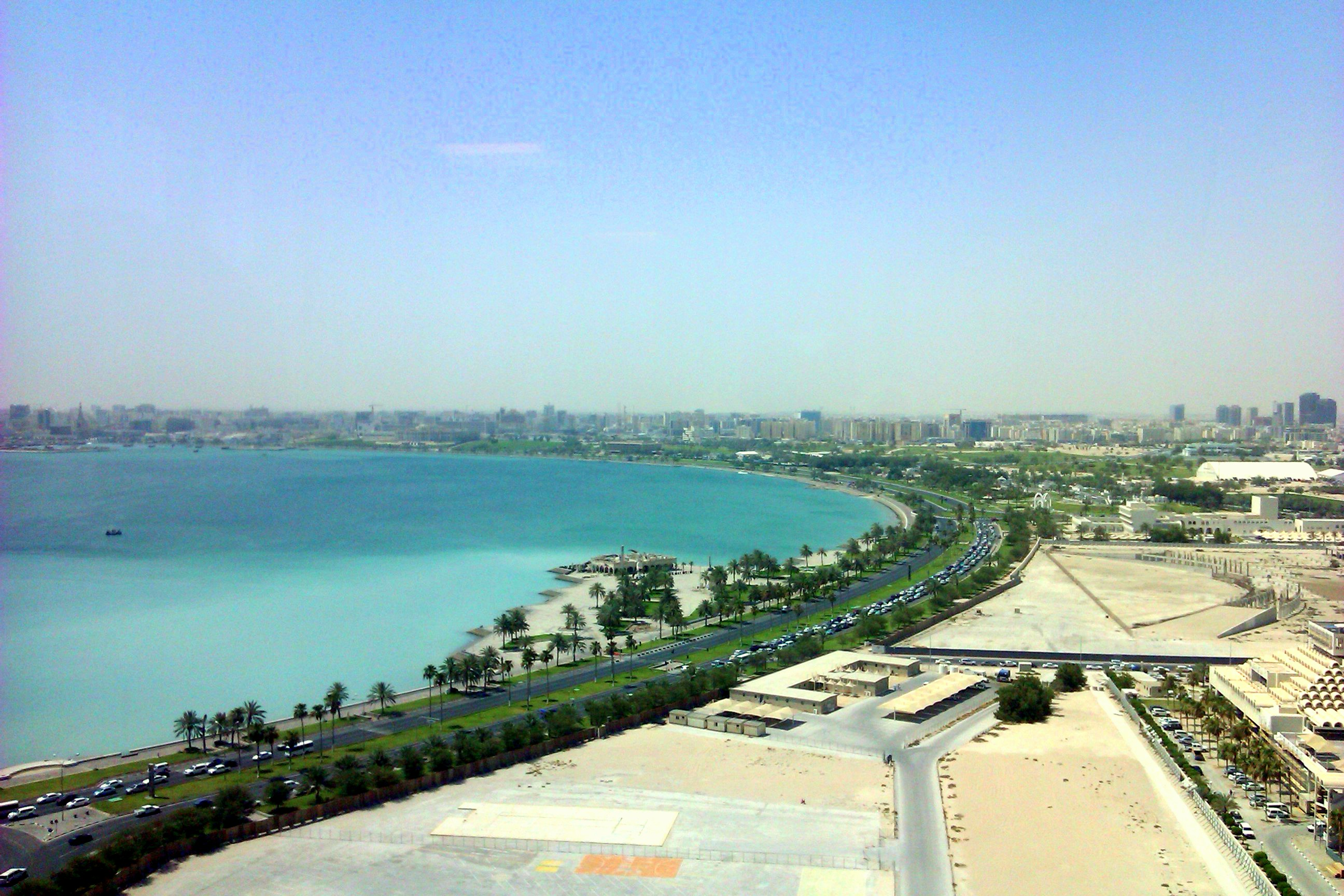
- View of the Doha Corniche
- Interactive map of Doha Corniche
- Location: Doha, Qatar
- Address: Corniche Street, Doha, Qatar
- Status: Complete
- Groundbreaking: 1969
- Estimated completion: Various phases
- Use: Public promenade, recreation, tourism

Companies
- Developer: Technical Office of the Amiri Diwan
- Planner: Hisham Qaddumi, Urban Planning Office of the Amiri Diwan

Technical details
- Size: Approximately 7 kilometres (4.3 mi) in length

The Doha Corniche (Arabic: كورنيش الدوحة) is a waterfront promenade and dual carriageway extending for seven kilometres (4.3 mi) along the crescent-shaped Doha Bay in Qatar's capital city, Doha. A lush, semi-circular linear public space, the Corniche serves as the central location for national celebrations, including Qatar National Day Parade and National Sports Day, as well as various religious, civic, and sporting events, making it one of the most popular tourist and recreational destinations in Qatar.

The Corniche links the modern central business district of Al Dafna in the north to the historic sections of old Doha in the south. It serves as a route for vehicular and pedestrian traffic, a continuous strip of open space, and a symbol of Doha's modernization.

== Description ==
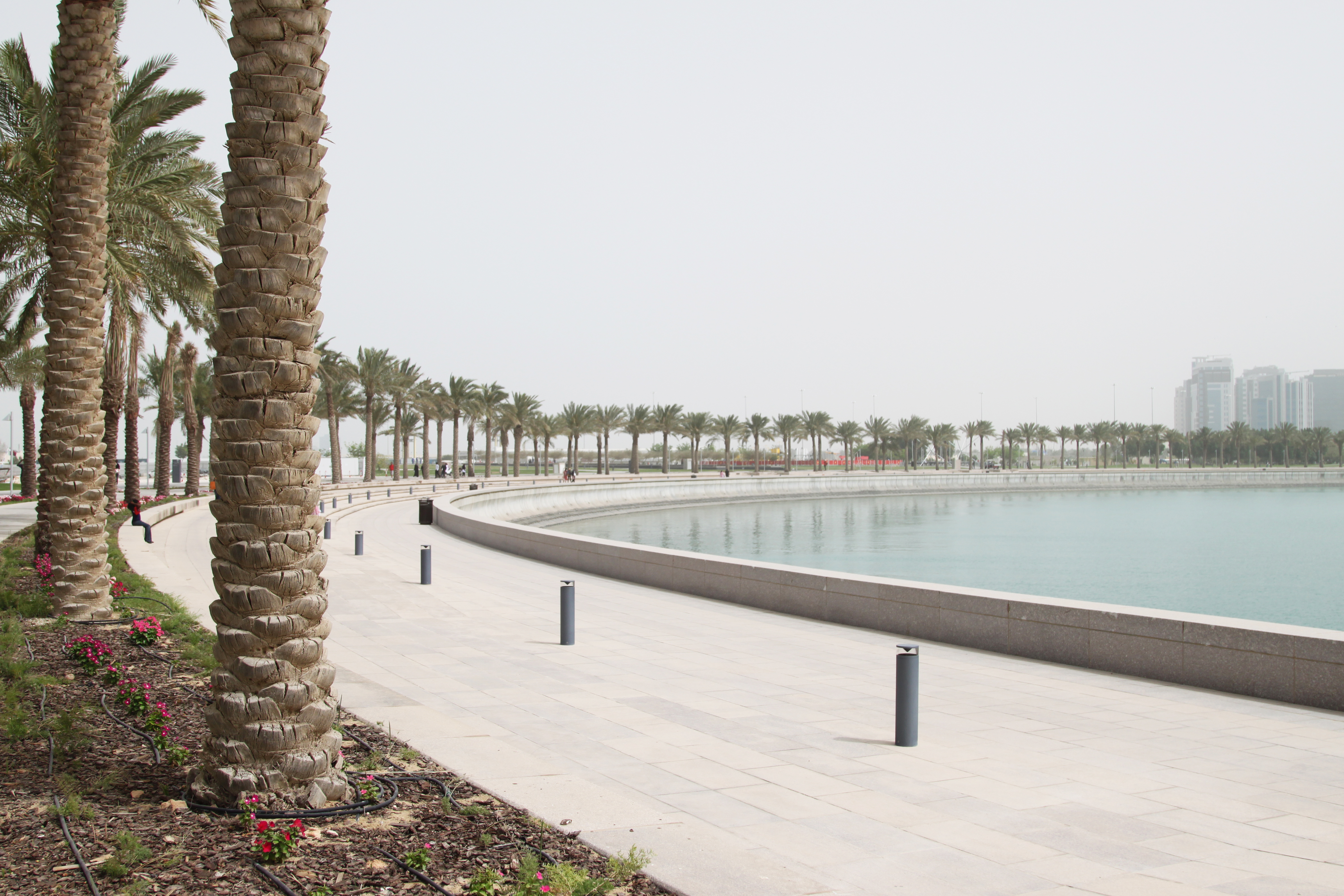
The promenade overlooking Doha Bay

Wrapping around Doha Bay, the Corniche comprises a seafront promenade and dual carriageway extending for seven kilometers from the West Bay area's Sheraton Hotel in the north to the Al Khulaifat district's Doha Club Park in the south, passing Doha Port and its facilities.

Peripheral parking areas near the Corniche allow visitors to park their vehicles and reach the waterfront via shuttles or pedestrian pathways, such as the Corniche's many underpasses. Seven of the 37 stations of the Doha Metro are near the Corniche.

The Corniche's southern end provides access to Doha's oldest districts—Al Jasrah and Msheireb—and the Souq Waqif marketplace, all among the country's preeminent cultural sites. The area is also among the country's most heavily-trafficked and congested. Souq Waqif sat along the coastline until land reclamation during the Corniche's construction shifted the coastline eastward.

There are three main areas of the Corniche: the Corniche Park and Promenade, Corniche Street, and the Government zone. Corniche Street is a divided highway that connects Doha's Al Dafna business district with the south of the city and Doha International Airport. The Government zone, which commands a view of the bay, is home to administrative buildings such as the Amiri Diwan.

By placing contemporary institutional buildings along the coastline, instead of in the city's historical section, the Qatari government enhanced its architectural profile, presenting itself as a modern, independent entity while creating a physical separation from the traditional urban landscape.

The Corniche also connects the mainland to a 3 kilometres (1.9 mi) artificial island created in 2008 for the Museum of Islamic Art and nearby development.

== History ==
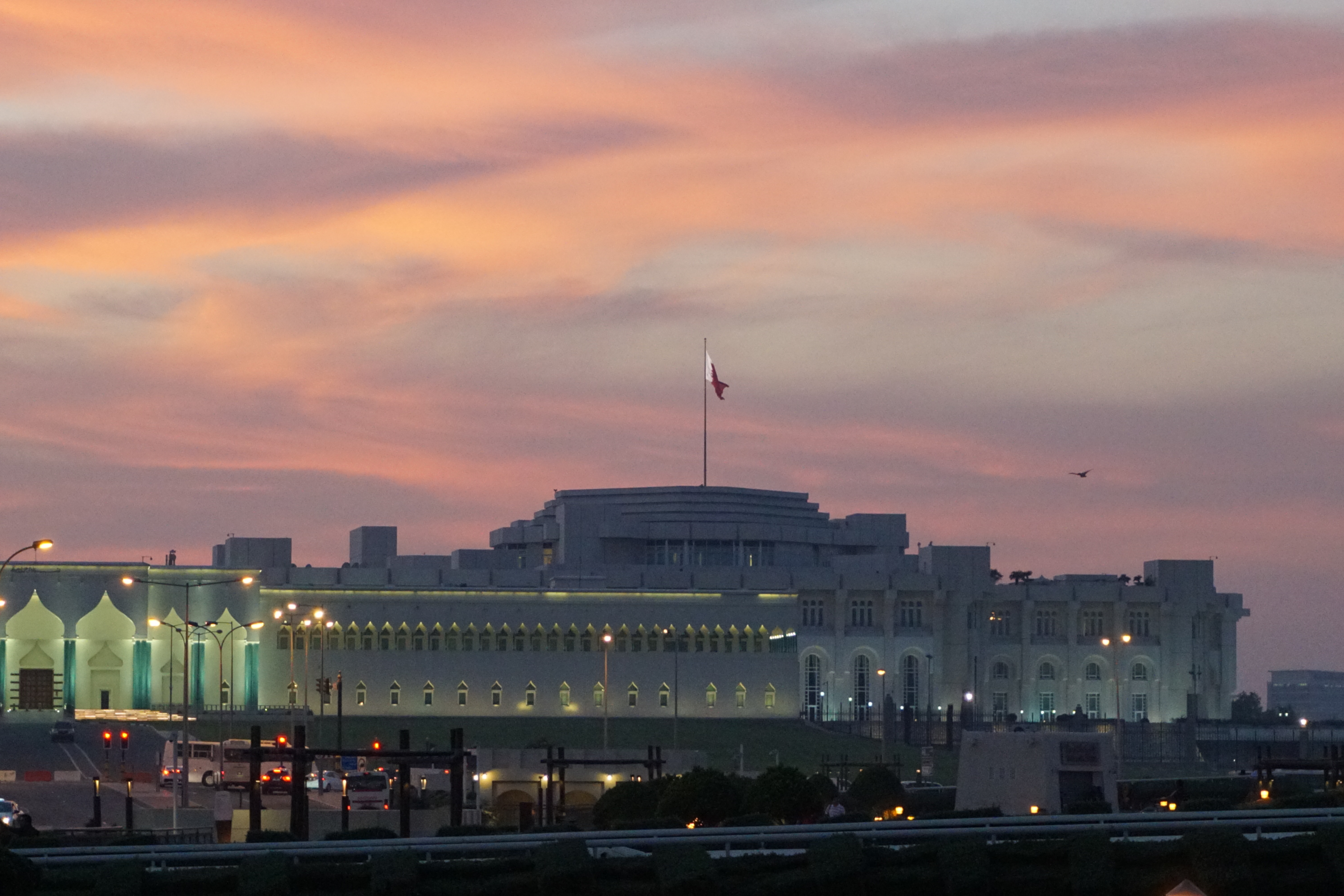
View of Amiri Diwan from the Corniche Promenade

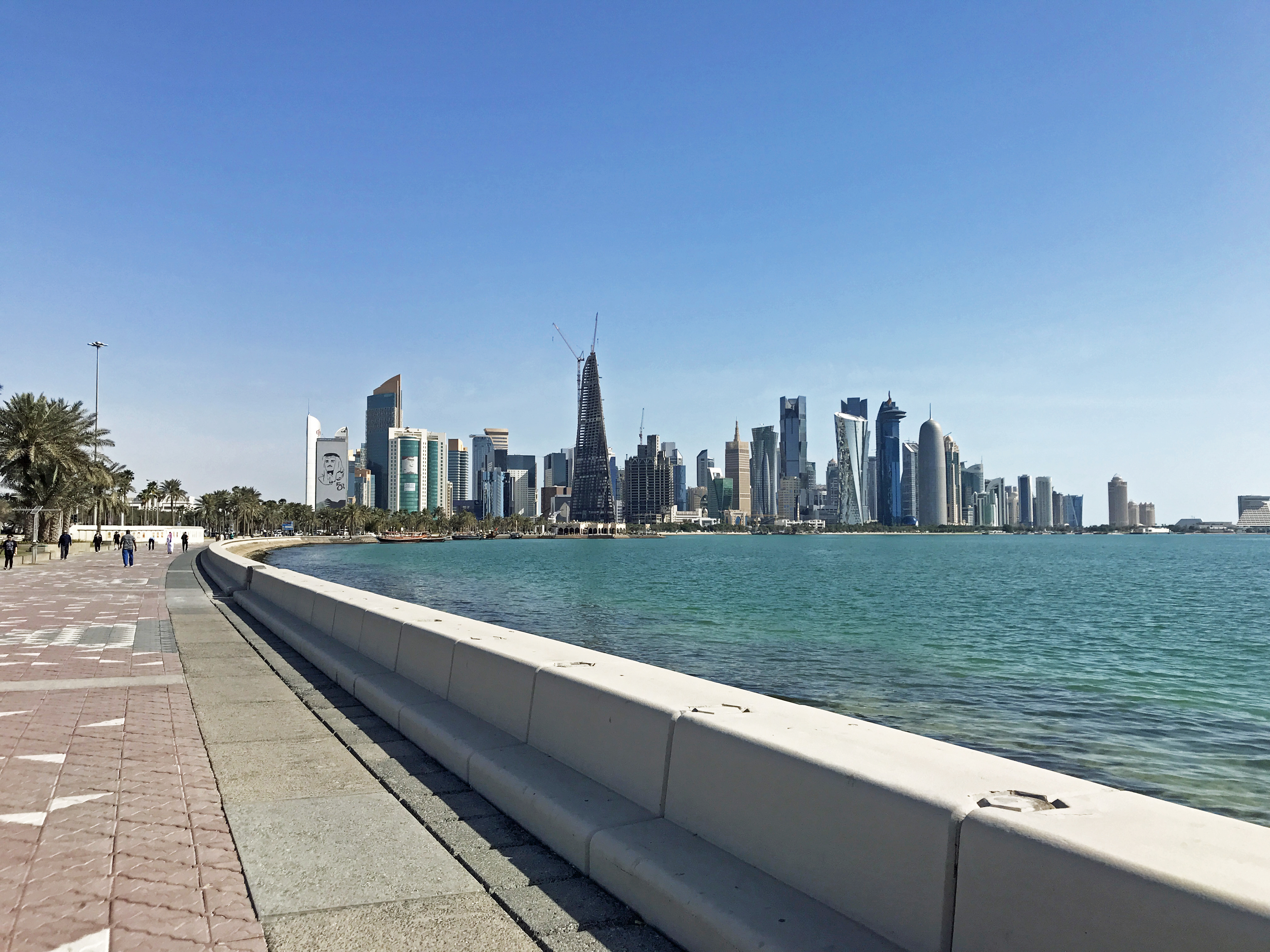
Doha Corniche with the Doha skyline in the background

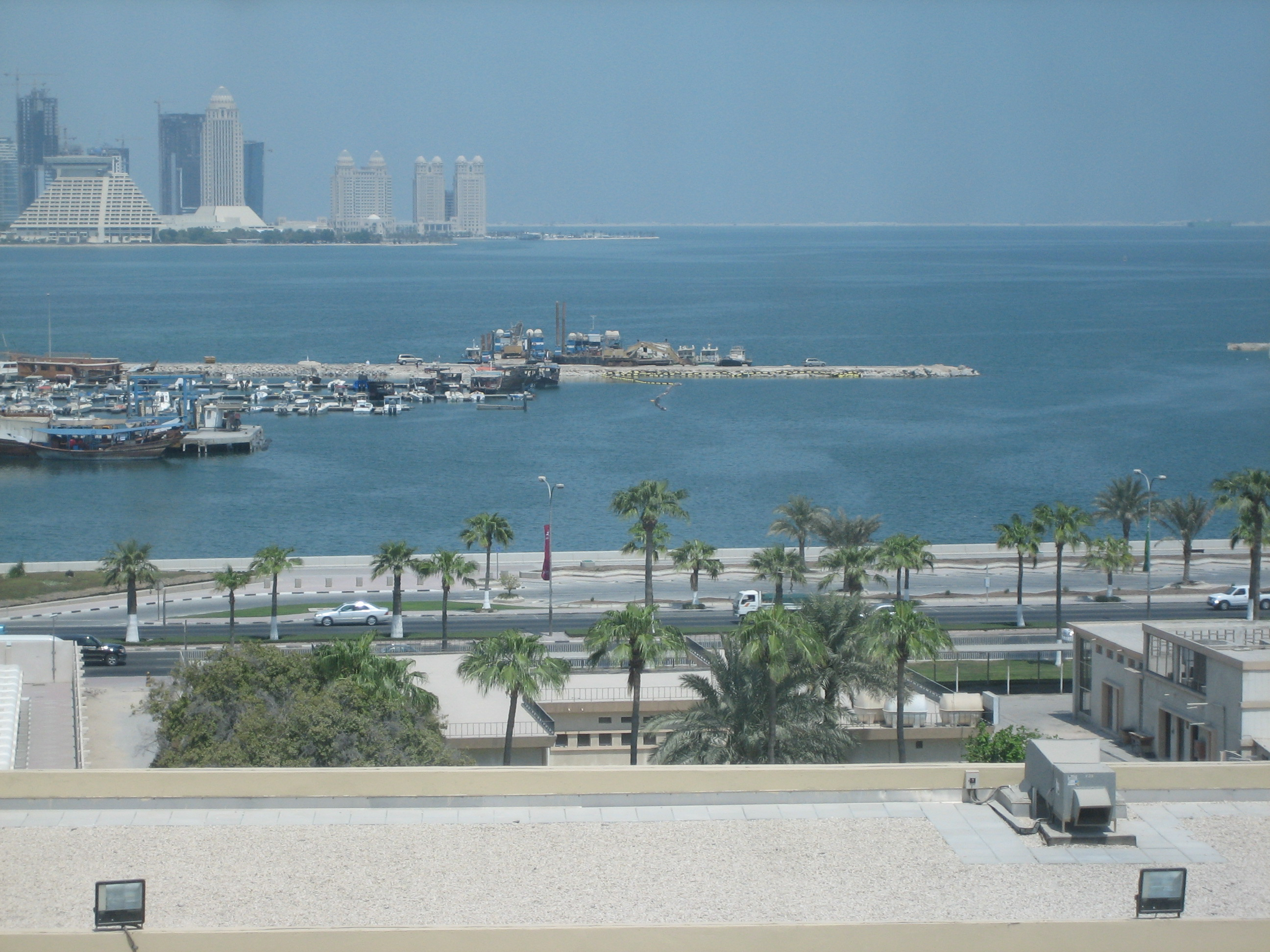
General view of Corniche Street at its southern end

=== Foundations ===
In the late 1960s, the Qatari government launched several land reclamation projects near Doha Bay. Ground was broken for the Amiri Diwan government-house complex west of Souq Waqif in 1969, followed by the development of the headquarters for the Qatar National Bank and Ministry of Foreign Affairs.

During the early 1970s, Qatar gained independence from Britain, established a central monarchist government under Sheikh Khalifa bin Hamad Al Thani, and developed its oil industry. Doha's urban landscape shifted, with the Corniche emerging as a prime site for large investments to modernize the city and improve the state's reputation through nation branding, using modernist aesthetics to project its soft power. The introduction of the first formal national development plan in 1972 prioritized land reclamation along the Corniche for urban development.

=== Urban planning and bureaucratization ===
Urban schemes for the Corniche were integral to the state's broader bureaucratization and oil resource exploitation. The development involved collaboration among various ministries, local stakeholders, foreign architects, and urban planners. Despite some resistance to Western urban models, the Amiri Diwan played a key role in high-profile projects along the Corniche, overseeing land reclamation throughout the 1970s and 1980s.

The Urban Planning Office of the Amiri Diwan, led by Hisham Qaddumi, was primarily responsible for major urban projects. Qaddumi, founder of Arab Architects in Jordan, served as the planning and development advisor at the Amiri Diwan from 1974 to 1987, overseeing the design and construction along the Corniche.

Qaddumi commissioned American architect William Pereira to design the Sheraton Grand Doha Resort & Convention Hotel and other landmarks along the Corniche. Upon Pereira's arrival in Doha in 1975, he and Qaddumi collaborated closely on planning the Corniche, aiming to purify nearby water, complete the Corniche's semicircular sweep, and increase land availability for development. They produced over 40 sketches, identifying key locations for landmarks such as the Sheraton and a national university. The Corniche road was designed to include five roundabouts, each linking to adjacent neighborhoods and extending to prospective developments on the city's outskirts.

=== Rapid development ===
The Corniche underwent urbanization in the 1980s. The project's primary goals included creating a crucial transportation route and establishing a Ministry Complex. Qaddumi coordinated the planning, aligning Sheikh Khalifa bin Hamad's vision with modern architectural practices. The first developmental plan for Doha, which included land reclamation of 630 hectares (6.3 km^{2}), was completed in the late 1970s.

Sheraton Grand Doha Resort & Convention Hotel

The Sheraton Hotel, built on a specially created island formed from reclaimed land, was inaugurated on 22 February 1982 in a ceremony attended by Qatar's ruler and aired on national television. Contrasting sharply with the governmental buildings, its construction involved advanced techniques, and its grand atrium, known as 'the majlis,' served as a social gathering space. The Sheraton was widely recognized as a symbol of the Corniche's development. It also catalyzed the creation of a new central business district called Al Dafna, also built on dredged land, in the 1980s.

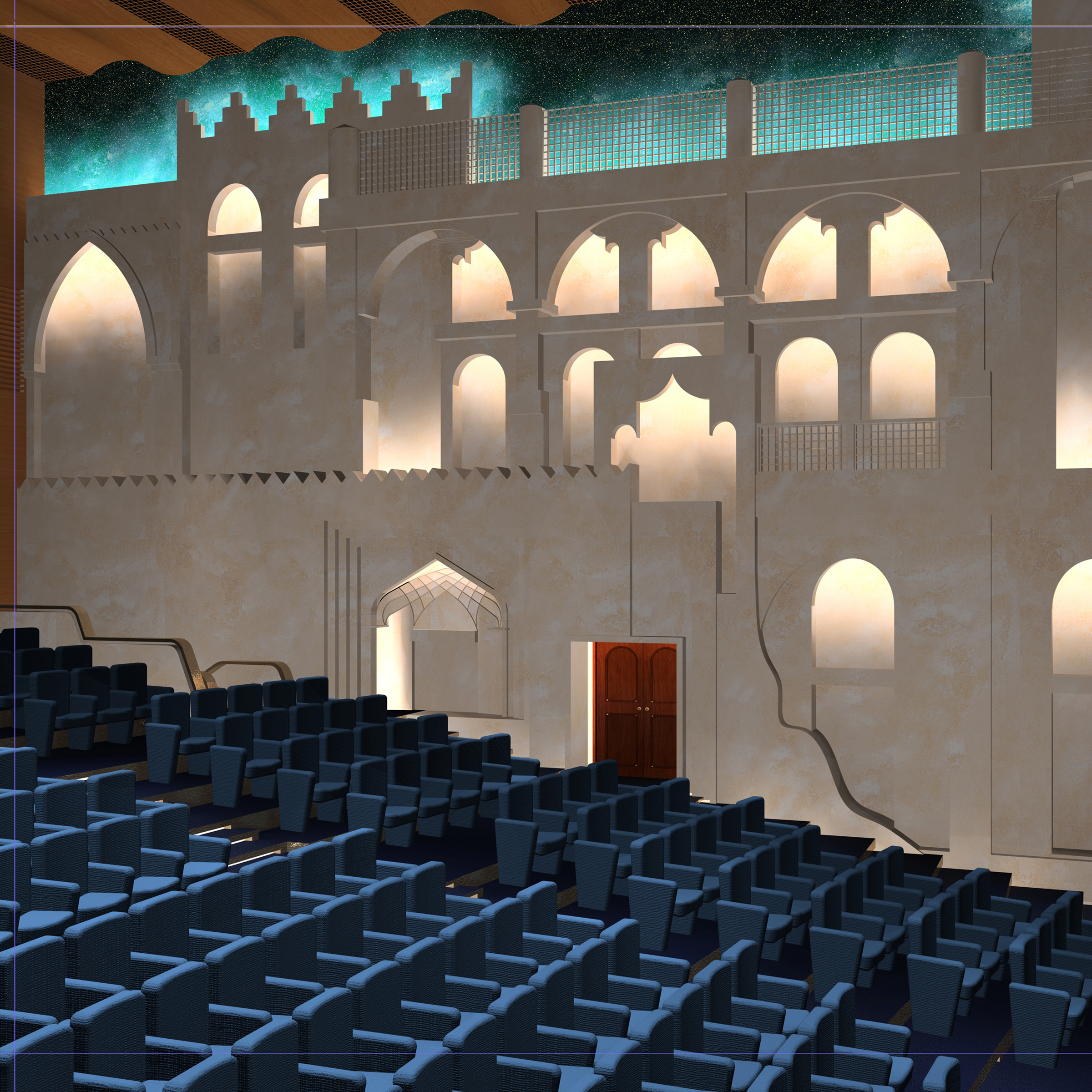
Qatar National Theater interior

The Ministry Complex was realized through contributions from various international architects invited by Qaddumi. The Ministry of Finance was designed by Kenzō Tange, while Triad Cico designed both the Ministry of Information and Communication Technology and the Qatar National Theater in 1982.

In 1988, the Central Post Office for Qatar Post in Doha opened on the Corniche, two years later than planned. Considered a good example of brutalist architecture and a prominent local landmark, Twist Whitley Architects and ComConsult designed it with semi-monocoque structures supporting its tapered roofs, mimicking traditional message-delivery methods. Georges Candilis also designed two housing projects for international staff, one of which was behind the Central Post Office, which Qaddumi noted would pose problems due to its rapid, modular design. It was demolished in 2003.

=== Further proposals and projects ===
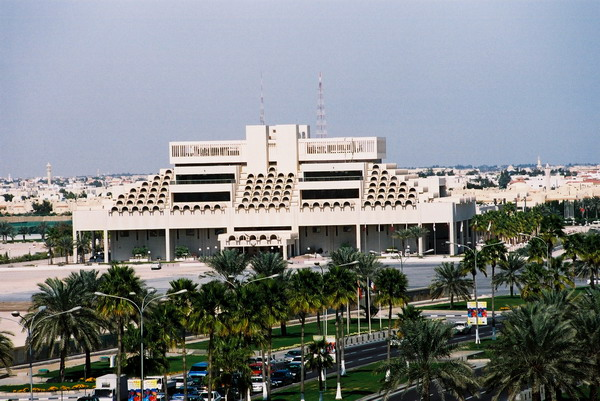
Qatar Post Office

The Corniche came to be defined by its high density of high-rises and architectural diversity. Strategically aligned along the Corniche's arc, the Ministry Complex and Amiri Diwan were prominent features, in addition to the Sheraton Hotel at the northern end. In 1988, the government contracted Sir Alexander Gibb & Partners as the consulting engineer for an $8 million project to construct promenades and parks.

The Corniche's development was influenced by the 1995 Qatari coup d'état and Hamad bin Khalifa Al Thani's ascension, alongside Qatar's economic reorientation towards expanding Doha. This shift led to an investment of over $130 billion in the city's architecture. The construction of malls, skyscrapers, gated residential communities, museums, and new sports facilities resulted from the urban and real estate boom.

=== 21st century ===
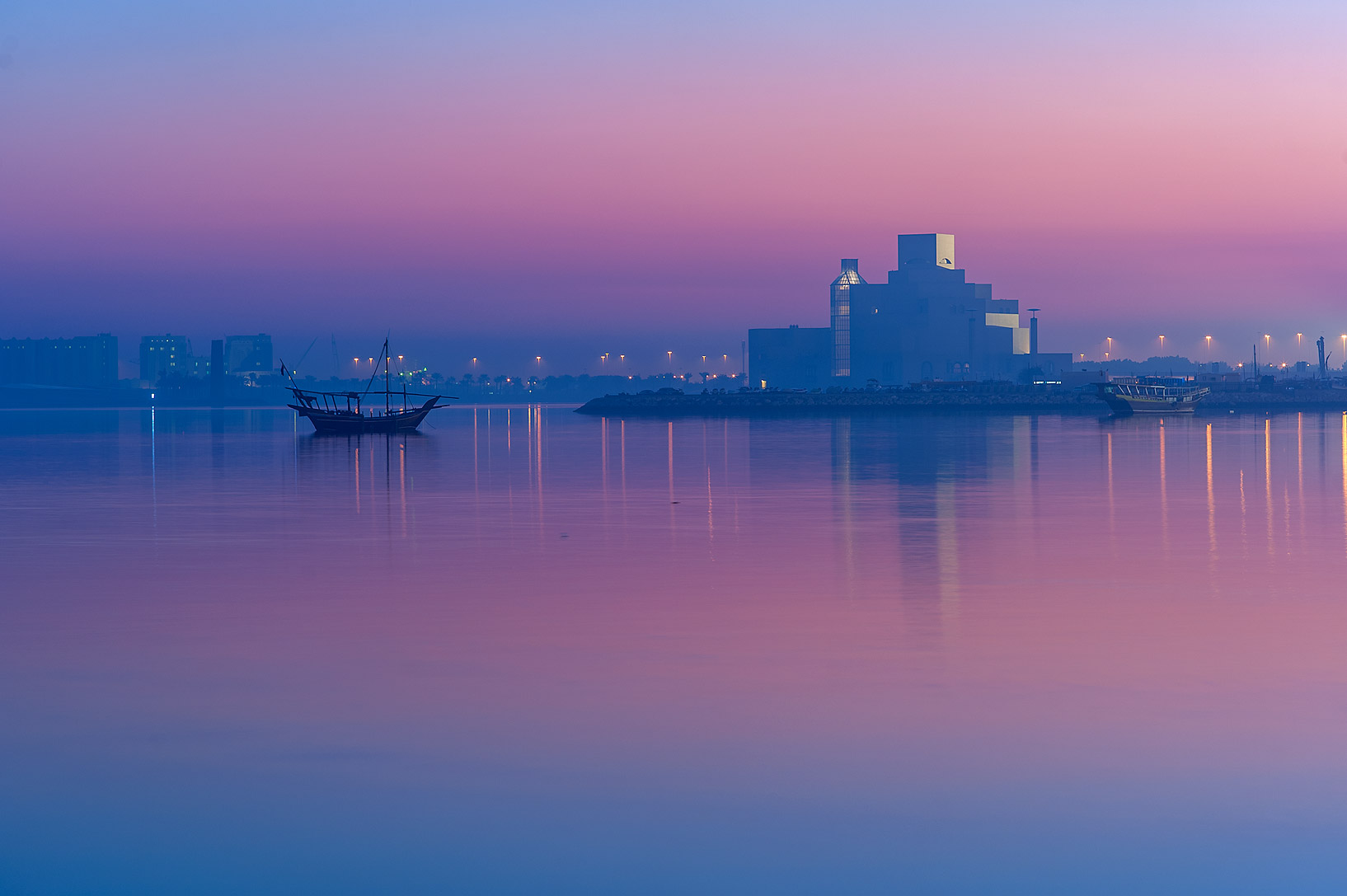
Museum of Islamic Art

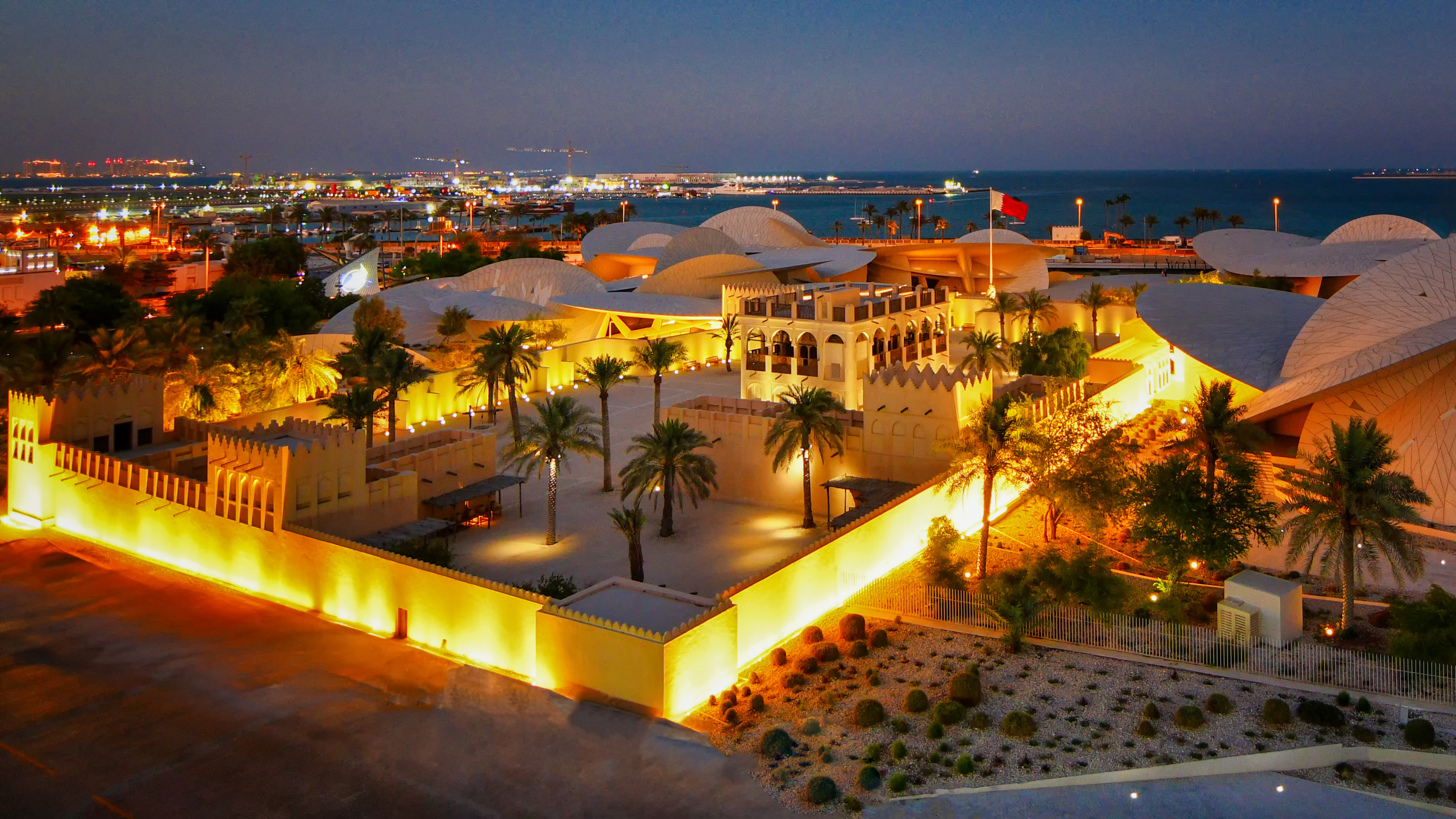
National Museum of Qatar

The Museum of Islamic Art, Doha, designed by Chinese-American architect I. M. Pei, opened on the Corniche in December 2008.

Pei, given free rein by Hamad, had rejected several proposed sites for the museum that sat directly on the Corniche. Instead, he stipulated that the museum sit upon its own man-made island 195 feet (59 m) from the Corniche to preserve its status as a stand-alone landmark. Adjacent to the park is the Museum of Islamic Art Park (MIA Park), occupying an area of 64 acres (0.26 km^{2}).

In April 2019, the National Museum of Qatar (NMOQ), designed by French architect Jean Nouvel, opened its doors to the public on the Corniche's southern extremity. Occupying an area of 1.5 million square feet, it was built in place of the previous museum, which was opened in 1975 in the abandoned Old Amiri Palace. The NMOQ is separated from the Corniche Promenade by an artificial lagoon, enhanced by fountain sculptures created by artist Jean-Michel Othoniel, inspired by Arabic calligraphy.

Ashghal (The Public Works Authority) launched the Doha Corniche Development Project in October 2017. The project included the creation of four open exhibition spaces featuring artwork that reflects Qatari heritage. Additionally, pedestrian and cycling infrastructure was improved by constructing tunnels to connect the downtown with the promenade and cycling paths on Corniche Street. The façades of buildings and public art installations were also renovated, and facilities were added to the Corniche's beaches. Basic infrastructure, such as road networks and sewage and drainage networks, was overhauled as part of the project.

== Monuments and art installations ==
Several monuments and art installations adorn the Corniche's promenade, some of which have been installed to commemorate certain events. One of the best-known examples of commemorative art is the Orry the Oryx Sculpture, a 30 feet (9.1 m) tall sculpture erected for the 2006 Asian Games. Retrofitted after the tournament ended, the sculpture depicts the tournament's Arabian oryx mascot. After years of deterioration due to exposure to the elements, the Public Works Authority restored the sculpture in 2018.

Previously, roundabouts along the Corniche, now replaced by traffic signals, often housed public art, predominantly sculptures, at their center. These sculptures often depicted heritage elements, such as Bedouin coffee pots and abstract patterns of Qatari fabrics, alongside symbols such as a globe monument representing Qatar's affiliation with the Gulf Cooperation Council.

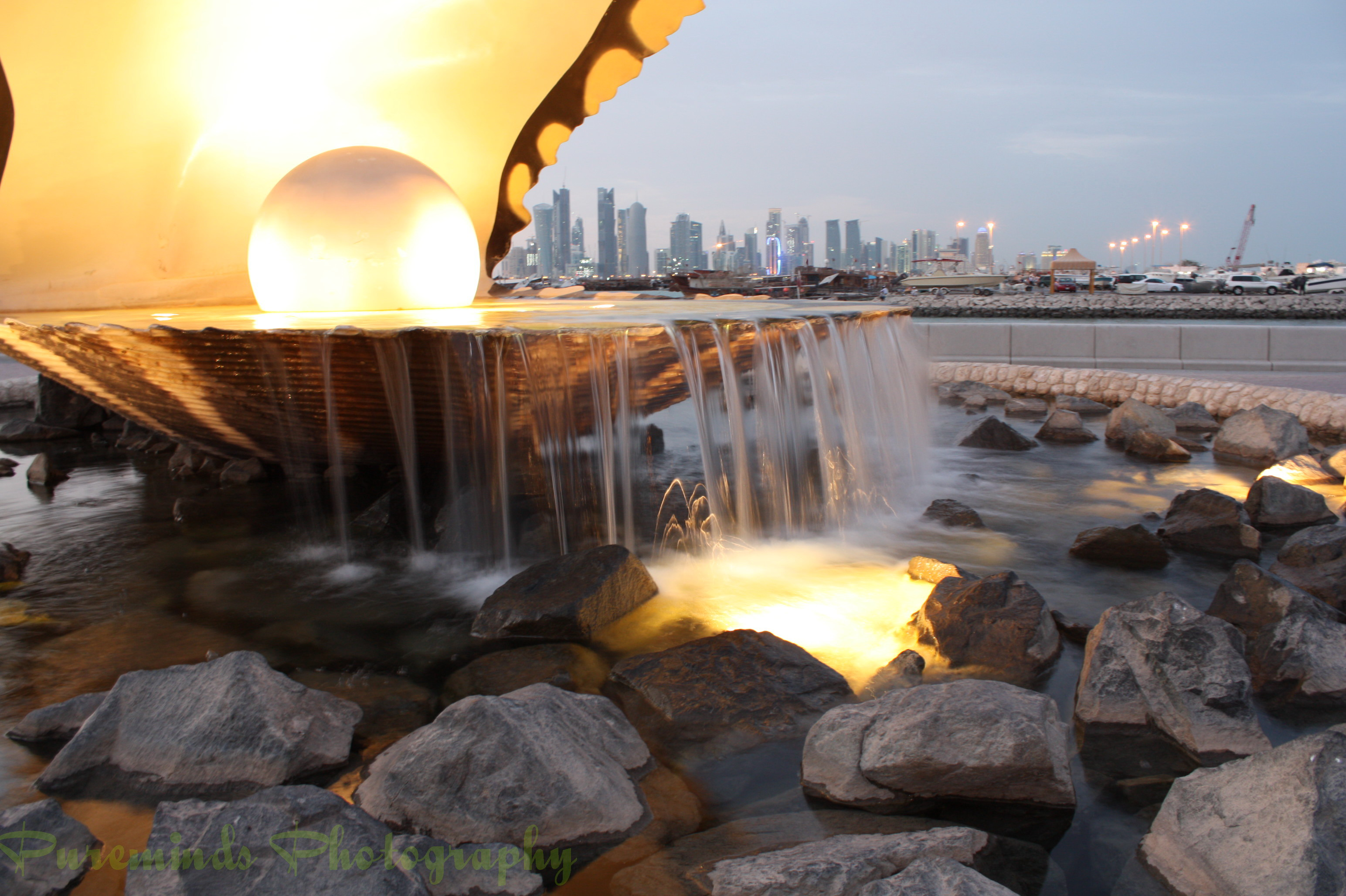
The Pearl Monument

The Pearl Monument, shaped like a shell enclosing a pearl to symbolize the local importance of pearl fishing, is located at the entrance of Doha Port and is a popular attraction on the Corniche.

The 80 feet (24 m) tall sculpture '7', designed by Richard Serra, was unveiled at the Museum of Islamic Art Park in 2011.

The Calligraphy Statue, inaugurated on the Corniche in 2013 for Qatar National Day, is inspired by a poem by Sheikh Jassim bin Mohammed Al Thani, the founder of the State of Qatar. Created by British artist Sabah Arbilli, the sculpture measures 7.5 metres (25 ft) high, including its base, and is crafted from stainless steel. The design features Arabic calligraphy to form the verse: "And amongst the sultans I stood out; as a lanneret floating over mountain peaks." This piece marks the first public sculpture to incorporate the poetry of Sheikh Jassim and represents Arbilli's first major public work.

In 2022, as part of the first phase of the Doha Corniche Development Project, several public art pieces were installed and exhibited on the Corniche in four designated spaces. One such work was The Dugong Sculpture, installed at the Corniche in October 2022. Created by American artist Jeff Koons, the sculpture, made of stainless steel, features a dugong, a marine mammal (also known as a "sea cow") riding on an ocean wave and surrounded by seagrass. The artwork measures 21 metres (69 ft) high and 31 metres (102 ft) wide and is displayed at Al Masrah Park near the Post Office.

== Events and festivals ==
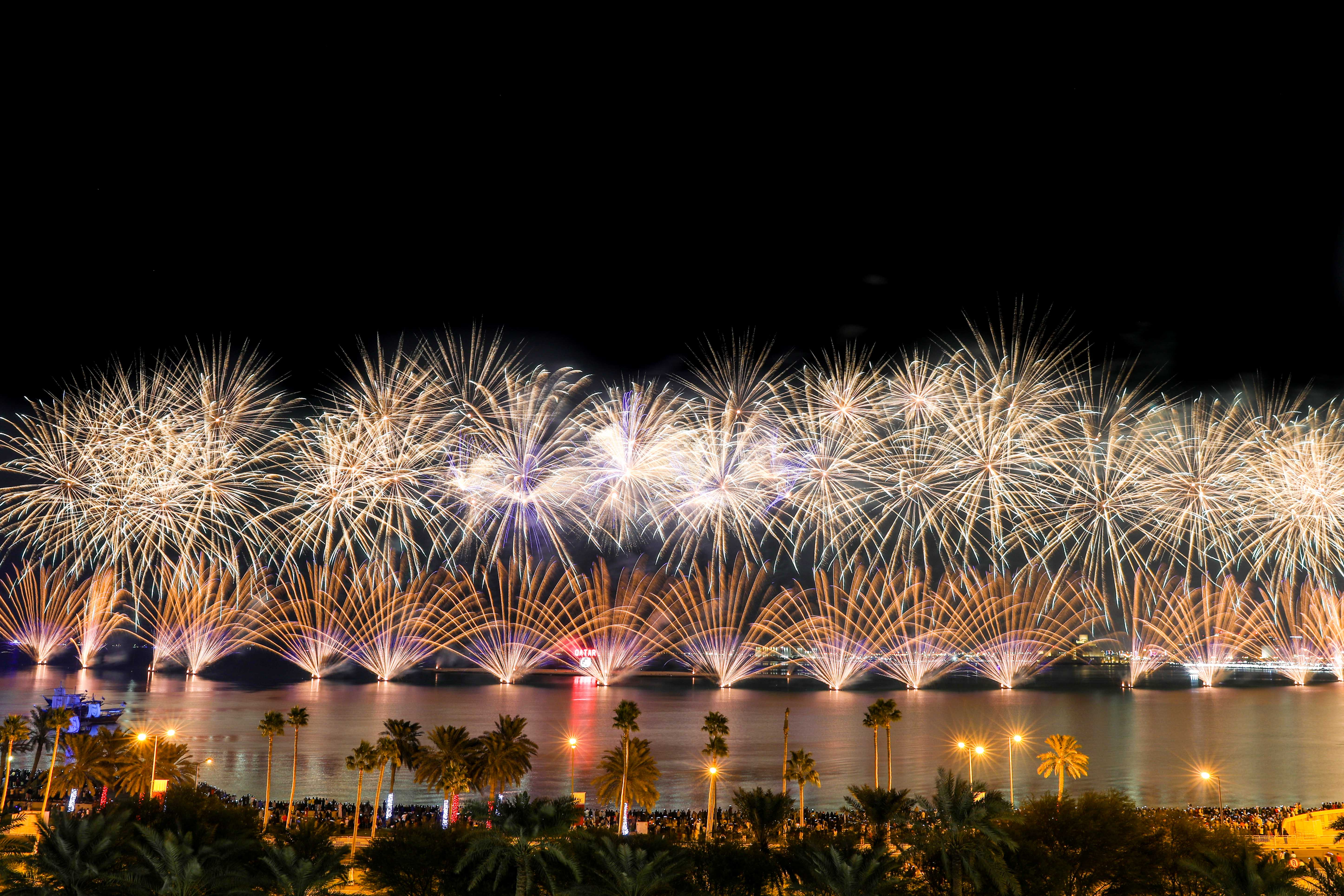
The fireworks show at the Corniche during the 2017 Qatar National Day

Several religious holidays are publicly celebrated at the Corniche. The inaugural Eid Al-Fitr Festival, organized by Qatar Tourism, was launched on 4 May 2022 and lasted for three days. Celebrations were held on the Corniche and featured performances from Qatari and Arab musicians. It is estimated that about 10,000 to 15,000 spectators attended the festivities each day.

Civic holidays such as the main parade of the annual Qatar National Day Parade take place on the Corniche. Visits from foreign diplomats also take place on the Corniche, with traffic being restricted during such events.

Celebrations of major sporting events such as the 2006 Asian Games often take place on the Corniche. The marathon, walking and cycling events of the 2006 Asian Games also took place here. During the 2022 FIFA World Cup hosted in Qatar, the Corniche was converted into a venue for live performances. To ensure pedestrian safety, vehicle access to the Corniche area was restricted. As part of the Doha Corniche Development Project, intended to prepare the city for the World Cup, the road system was upgraded, and the waterfront was fitted with 1,440 palm frond-shaped lighting poles. Furthermore, pedestrian underpasses and plazas were constructed and four spaces for open-air art exhibitions were designated.

Significant landscaping efforts were also undertaken for the World Cup, with over 137,000 square metres (1,470,000 sq ft) of new green areas being planted, including 940 trees and 920 palm trees. Three dhow boat docks were completed at Al Bidda Park, Al Dafna Park, and Sheraton Park. Dhow tours were offered to tourists from these docks. The Corniche also hosted numerous activities during the World Cup, including giant display screens for live match broadcasts, fan zones, musical festivals, cultural events, and international street fairs. Al Bidda Park was the site of the FIFA Fan Festival, featuring match broadcasts, performances, and cultural activities.

== Landscaping ==
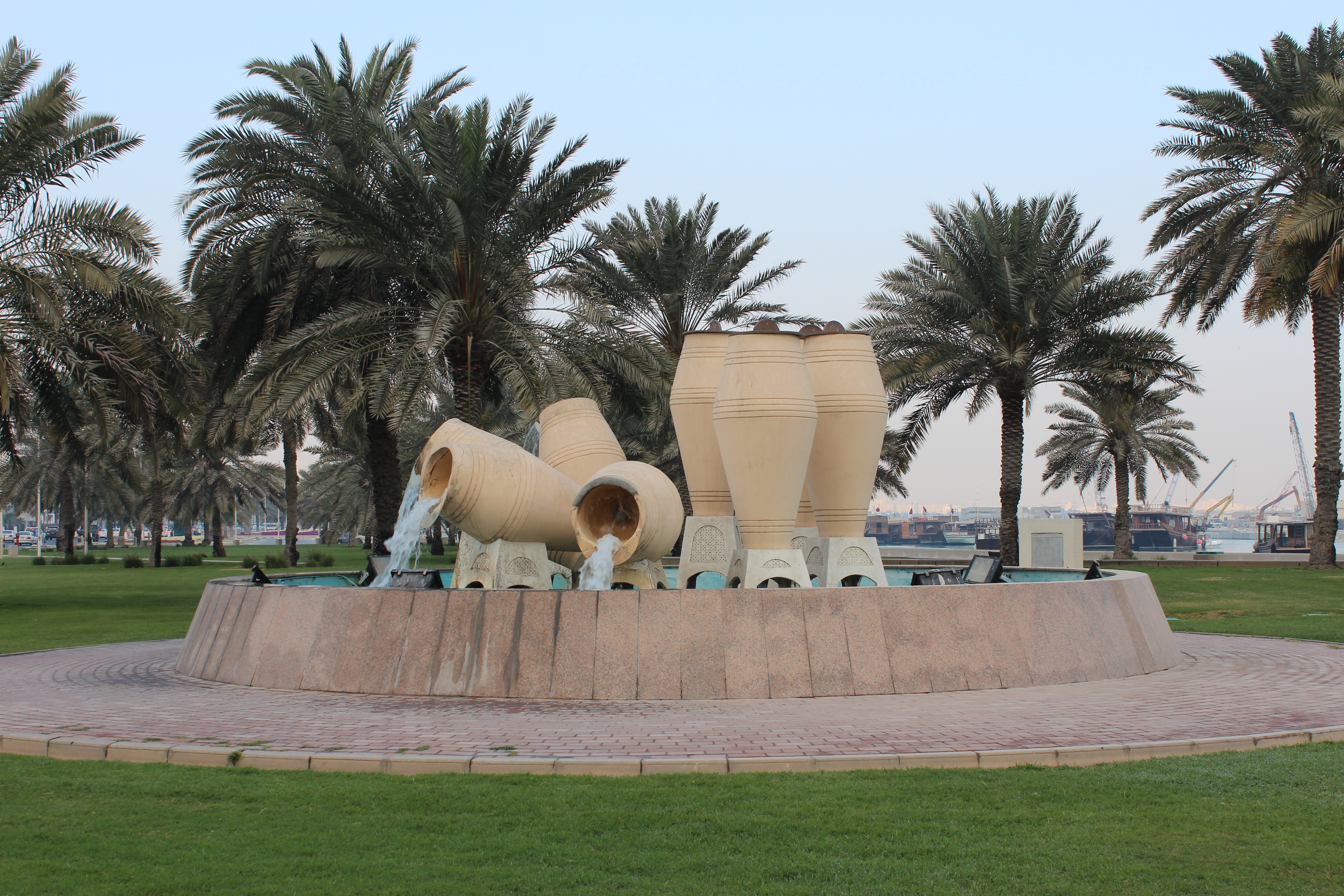
One of the Corniche's many fountains

The Corniche road features a six-lane avenue bordered by palm trees, flower beds, and sculptures that reflect Arab cultural motifs. Strategically placed trees, primarily date palms, provide shade to pedestrian pathways and seating areas, helping to mitigate the effects of direct sunlight. However, many areas of the promenade and parks are unprotected from the sun.

Fountains are incorporated into the landscape design to enhance the sense of tranquility in the public space. Soft landscaping elements, including grassy areas and flower beds, are very common at the Corniche. Irrigation systems in pedestrian-trafficked use fresh water, a choice driven by the need to maintain hygienic conditions for the children who utilize the lawn turf. However, recycled water from sewage effluent is used for vegetation surrounding roadway medians and roundabouts. Significant water loss occurs during the hot months due to evaporation. Desert shrubs and drought-resistant grasses are commonly planted to minimize water consumption and maintain greenery throughout the year.

== Recreation ==
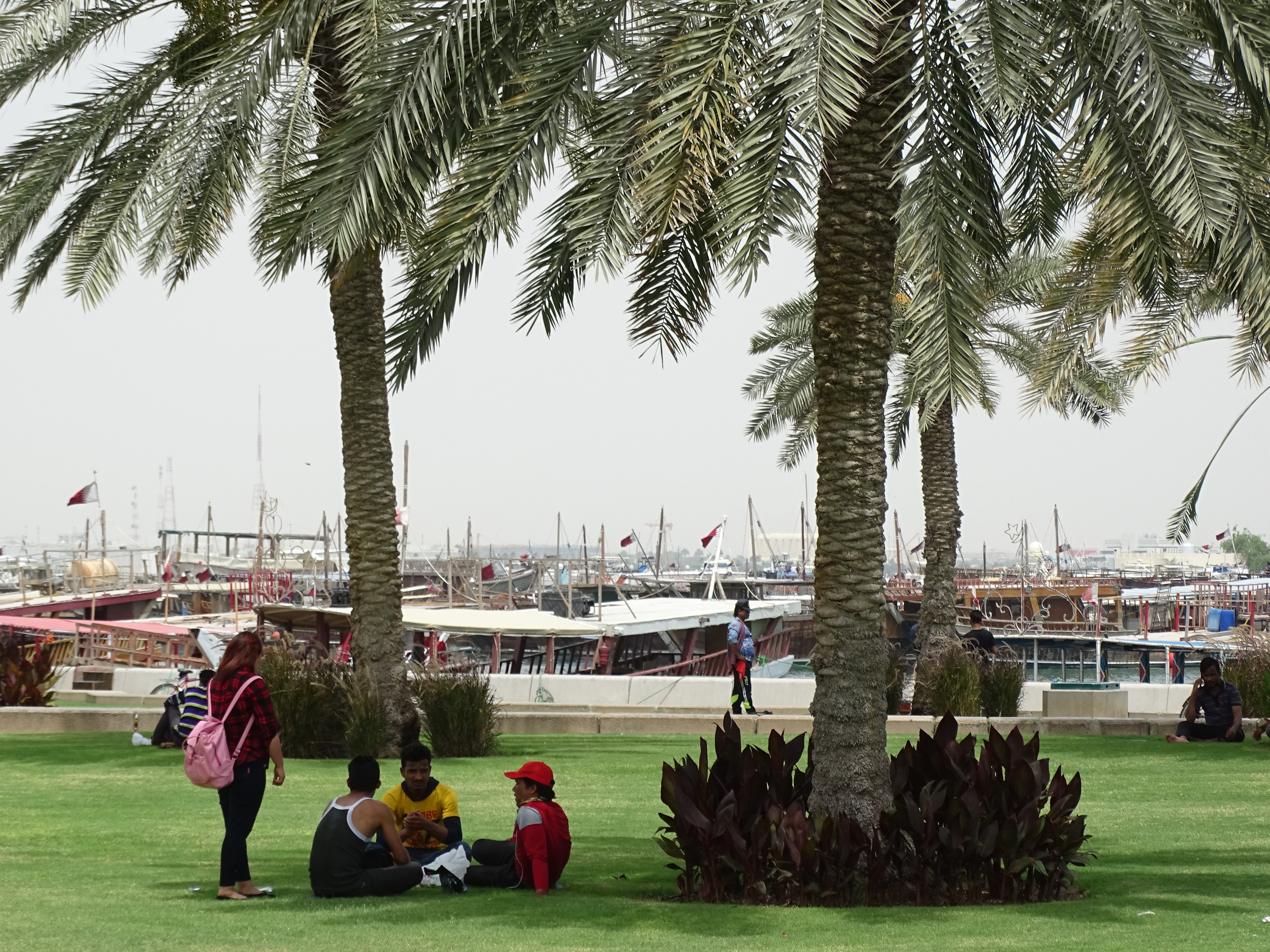
People socializing under the shade on the Corniche

The Corniche Promenade and Park serves as a central hub for recreation and social activities in Doha, drawing a diverse array of visitors throughout the day. In the early morning, expatriate joggers, and walkers and cyclists frequent the Corniche, taking advantage of the cooler temperatures and scenic views. At midday, construction workers from the nearby West Bay business district seek shade and a place to rest, while in the evenings and weekends, families gather to socialize and have picnics. The Corniche's open and accessible design makes it an inclusive space for all social classes. There are several parks on the Corniche, but as green spaces were not included as part of the Corniche's original master plan, they suffer from connectivity and accessibility issues.

=== Beaches ===
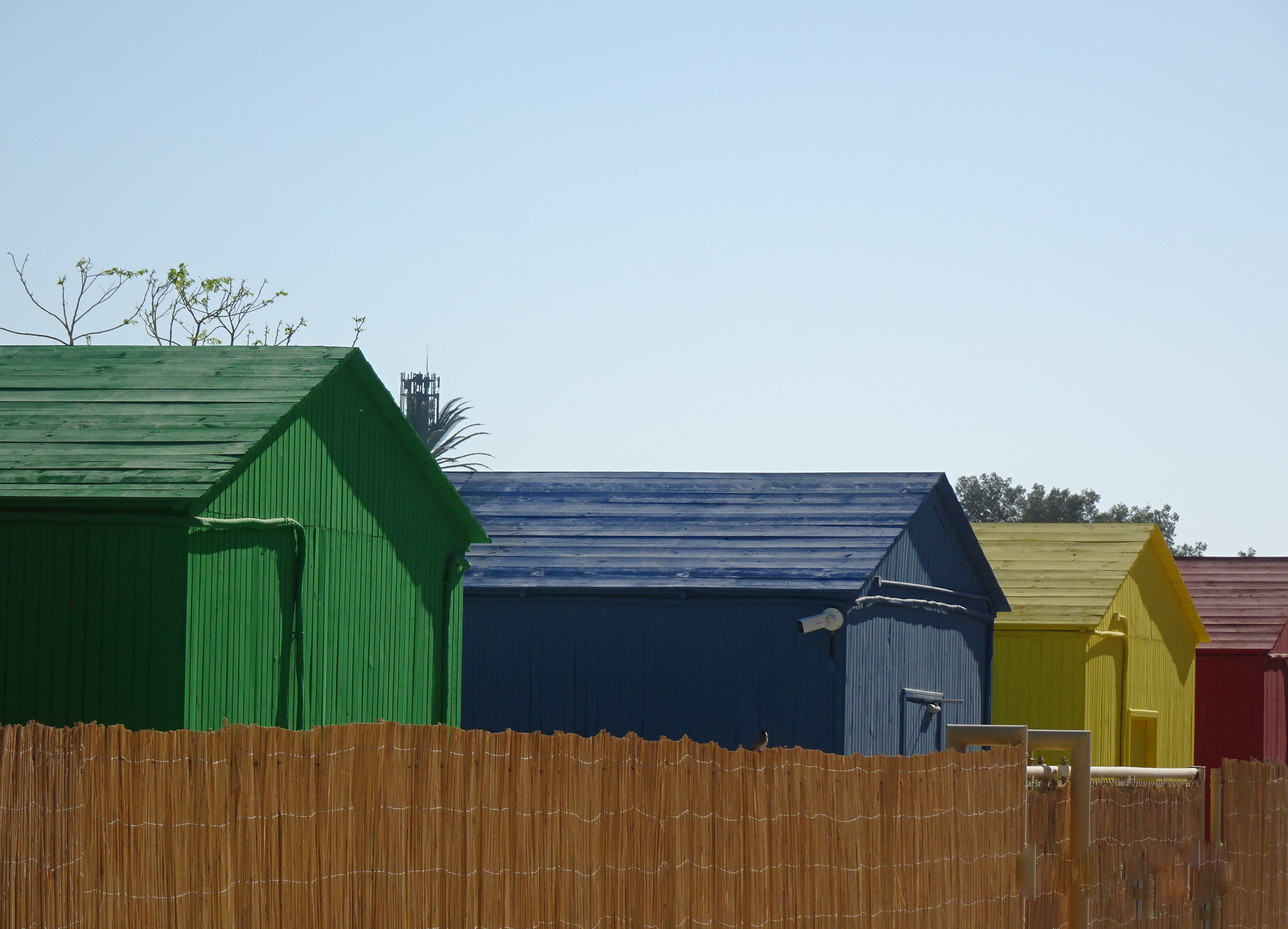
Colorful sheds at Doha Beach Sands Club

- Doha Beach Sands Club's primary feature is the waters of the Persian Gulf, which are suitable for swimming, snorkeling, and wading. There are beach football and volleyball courts, as well as tables for teqball. The beach club also includes self-service food outlets housed in colorful sheds.
- Ras Abu Aboud Beach is one of the Corniche's main attractions and underwent a development project launched by Ashghal in 2020 and completed in 2021. Spanning approximately 260,000 square metres (2,800,000 sq ft) and stretching 2.2 kilometres (1.4 mi), the project included a designated area for sports and a 2.6 kilometres (1.6 mi) pedestrian and cycling path.
- West Bay Beach is located in the central business area of West Bay. Key features include an outdoor cinema, volleyball court, food area with international cuisine, children's playground, and prayer rooms.

=== Parks ===
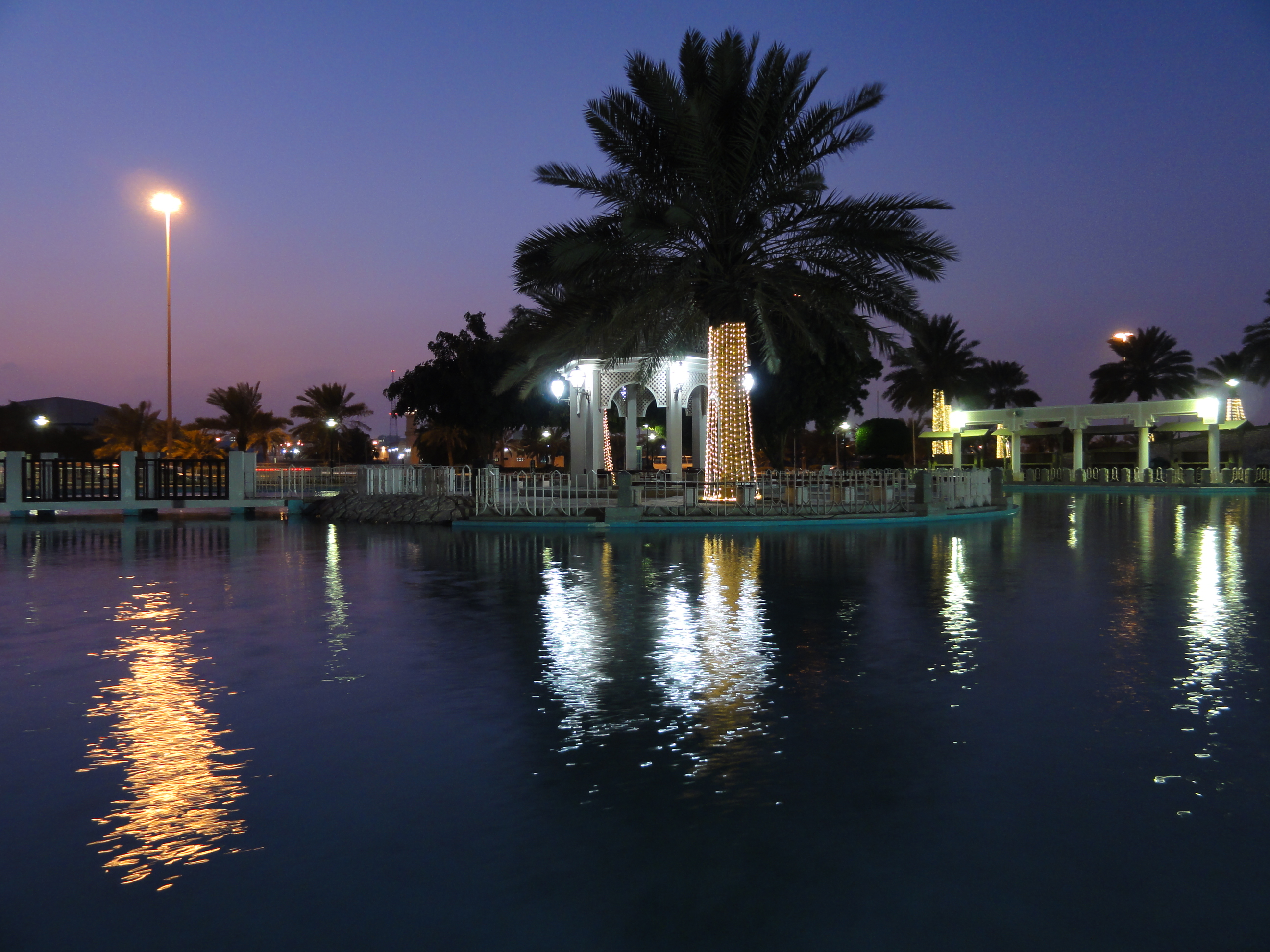
Al Bidda Park

- Al Bidda Park is one of the oldest and most visited parks in Doha, consisting of three sections overlooking the Corniche. The park spans 1,745,000 square metres (18,780,000 sq ft) and is divided into three zones: Rumeilah, Al Bidda, and Wadi Al Sail. It is one of the areas used for birdwatching. The park includes a children's playground, small shops, the Cultural Village, and a cultural heritage center.
- Al Dafna Park (also known as Sheraton Park), opened in 1990 near the Sheraton Hotel, spans an area of 93,297 square metres (1,004,240 sq ft) square meters.
- Al Masrah Park (also known as Umbrella Park) is borders Qatar Post to the north, Qatar National Theater to the south, Corniche Street to the east, and Majlis Al Taawon Street to the west. The park's name, "Al Masrah", was selected to honor its proximity to the Qatar National Theater. The park serves as a key connection point between the eastern side of Corniche Street and Council Street, facilitated by a tunnel and a metro station located at its center. Covering an area of 108,000 square metres (1,160,000 sq ft), Al Masrah Park features approximately 64,000 square metres (690,000 sq ft) of grass and hosts 850 trees comprising 16 different species.
- Museum of Islamic Art Park (MIA Park) is a park attached to the Museum of Islamic Art covering an area of nearly 70 acres (0.28 km^{2}). It was created through in 2008 land reclamation, resulting in a curved pier at its end. This pier is decorated with palm trees and includes a landscaped peninsula featuring grass-covered hills.

== Nearby landmarks ==
- Al Bidda Park
- Commercialbank Plaza
- Doha Port
- Doha Tower
- Dubai Towers Doha
- Q-Post
- National Museum of Qatar
- Qatar National Theatre
- Richard Serra's sculpture 7
