= Qatar National Theater =

Theater in Doha, Qatar

Coordinates: 25°10′54″N 51°23′08″E

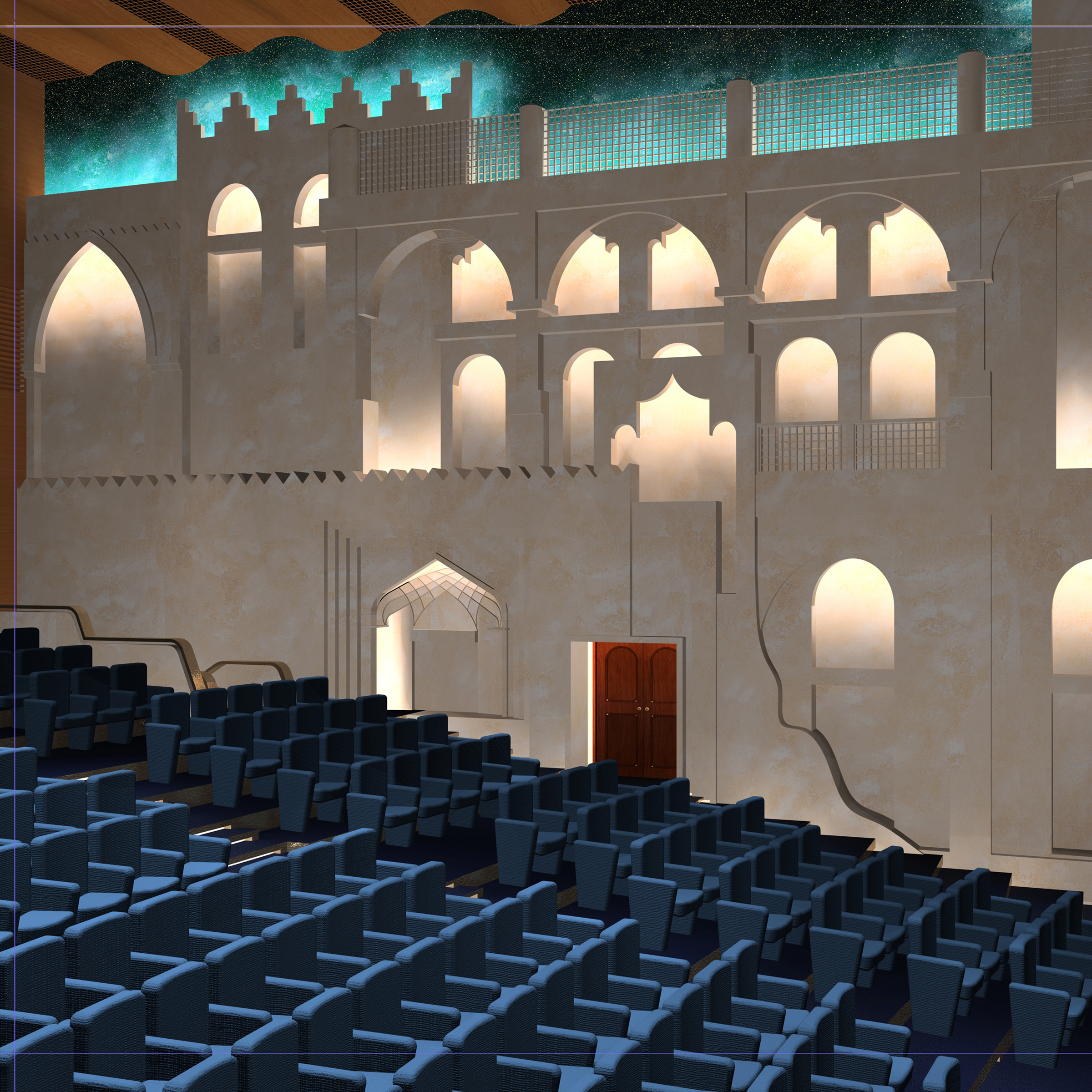
- Theater interior
- Interactive map of Qatar National Theater
- Address: Doha; Qatar
- Owner: Ministry of Culture, Arts and Heritage
- Capacity: 490
- Type: National

Construction
- Opened: 1982

Qatar National Theater is located on the Doha Corniche, near Al Bidda Park in Doha, Qatar. The 490-seat theatre opened in 1986 and hosts concerts and plays. In addition to hosting local troupes, it also hosts international and Arab theatrical troupes on occasion.

It is owned by the Ministry of Culture, Arts and Heritage. At its inception in 1982, it featured computerized lighting systems, translation facilities and an orchestra pit.

Since 2022, Qatar National Theater General Manager of Theater Affairs Center is Abdul Rahim Al-Siddiqi.

In 2023, performances on the stage at Qatar National Theater were suspended due to renovation work.

== Events hosted ==
The theatre hosted the 2013 edition of the Arab Theatre Festival after Qatar won the hosting rights for the first time in the event's history.

In 2015, Qatar Tourism Authority organized the Eid Al Adha Festival, as part of which The Wrestler, an Arabic play with actors Nasser Mohammad and Najwa Al Kubeisi was staged at the Qatar National Theater.

In 2022 The “Rock on Top of Another Rock” sculpture created by Peter Fischli and David Weiss was placed on display at the Qatar National Theater, as part of the Qatar Museums public art programme.

== Plays hosted ==
In December 2005, the Doha Players used the Qatar National Theaters stage to run their production of Cinderella.

The Doha Players production of Chitty Chitty Bang Bang opened in May 2016 at the Qatar National Theater.

In July 2017, the Qatar National Theater had two showings daily of the production Ali Baba & the 40 Thieves.

In 2020, the Center for Theater Affairs held the acting and directing workshops closing ceremony at the Qatar National Theater. The workshop was held in preparation for the Universities Theater Festival held on 20 March 2020.

== See also ==
- Theatre in Qatar
