= Zone 80, Qatar =

Zone 80
- Zone
- Interactive map of Zone 80
- Coordinates: 25.386020°N 51.222506°E
- Country: Qatar
- Municipality: Al-Shahaniya
- Blocks: 118

Area
  - Total: 287.1 km^{2} (110.8 sq mi)

Population (2015)
  - Total: 138,509
  - Density: 482.4/km^{2} (1,250/sq mi)
- Time zone: UTC+03 (Arabia Standard Time)
- ISO 3166 code: QA-SH

Zone 80 is a zone in the municipality of Al-Shahaniya in the state of Qatar. The main district recorded in the 2015 population census was Al-Shahaniya City, the municipal seat.

Other districts which fall within its administrative boundaries are Al Khurayb, Al Samriya, Lehsiniya, and Umm Leghab.

== Demographics ==
As of the 2010 census, the zone comprised 3,440 housing units and 1,430 establishments. There were 35,393 people living in the zone, of which 81% were male and 19% were female. Out of the 35,393 inhabitants, 86% were 20 years of age or older and 14% were under the age of 20.

Employed persons made up 82% of the total population. Females accounted for 10% of the working population, while males accounted for 90% of the working population.

Year	Population
1986	4,654
1997	6,852
2004	8,380
2010	35,393
2015	138,509

== Land use ==
The Ministry of Municipality and Environment (MME) breaks down land use in the zone as follows.

Area (km^{2})	Developed land (km^{2})	Undeveloped land (km^{2})	Residential (km^{2})	Commercial/ Industrial (km^{2})	Education/ Health (km^{2})	Farming/ Green areas (km^{2})	Other uses (km^{2})
287.11	101.54	185.57	1.93	0.10	0.18	44.38	54.85
