= Al-Shahaniya (city) =

Al-Shahaniya City مدينة الشحانية
- City
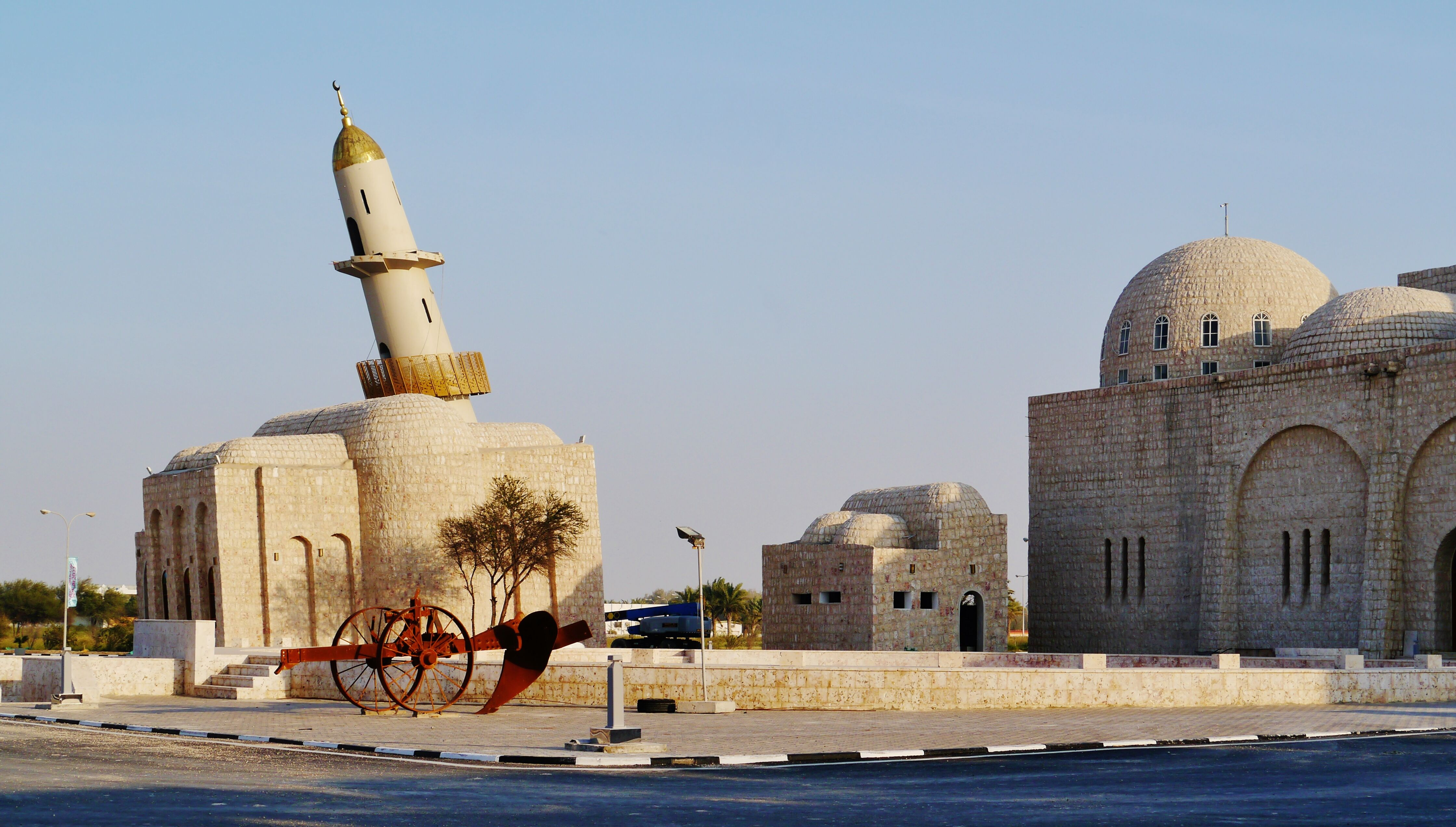
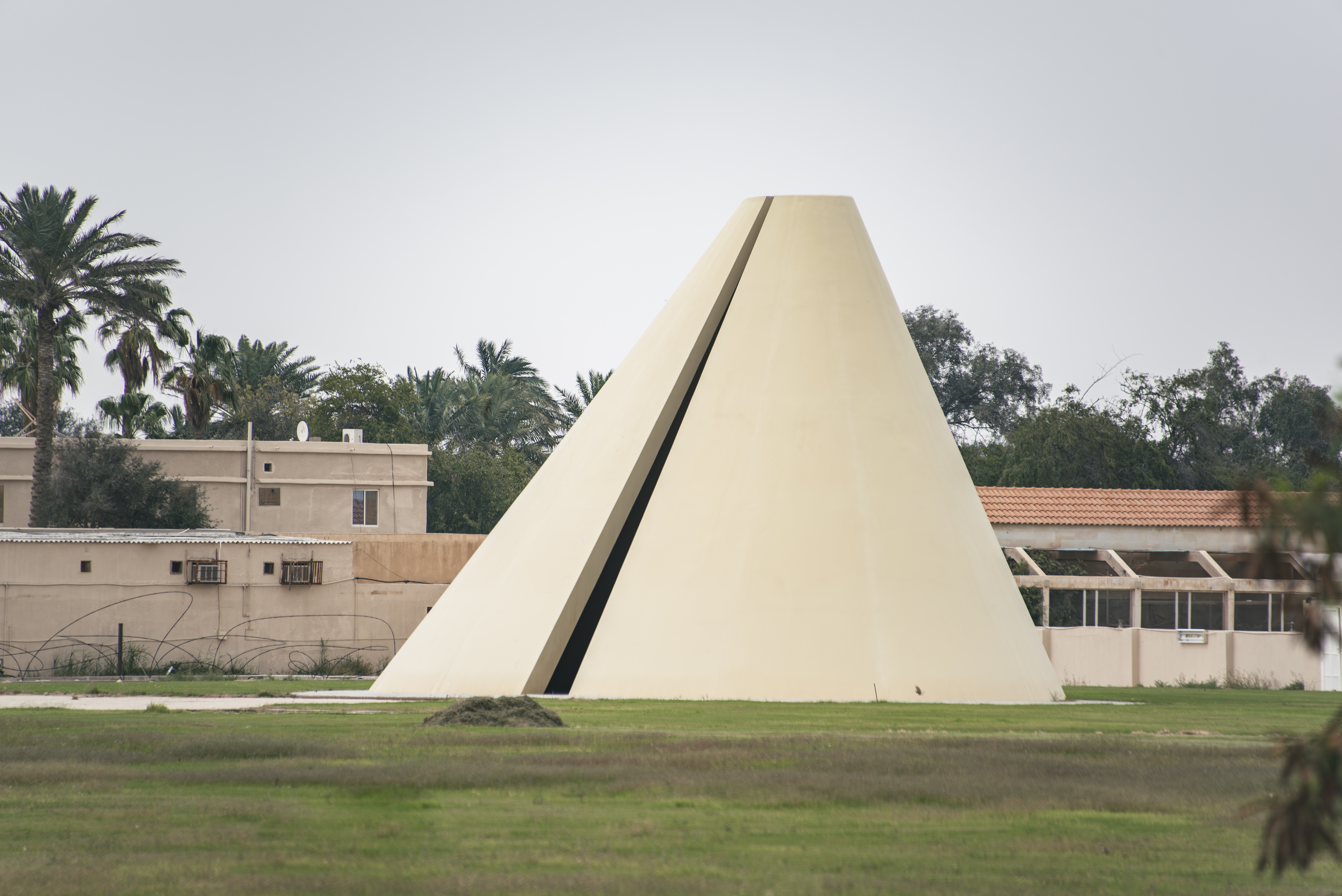
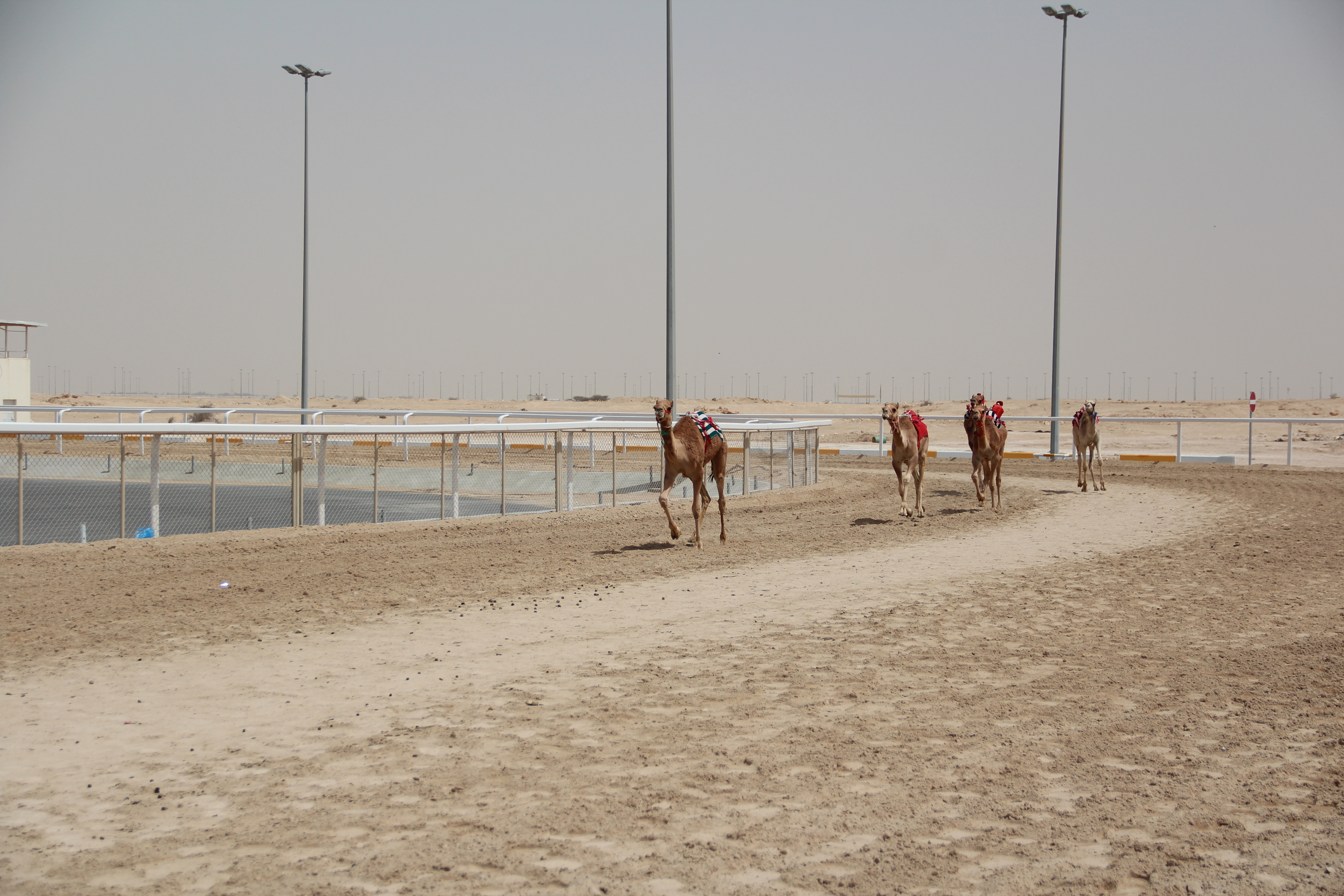
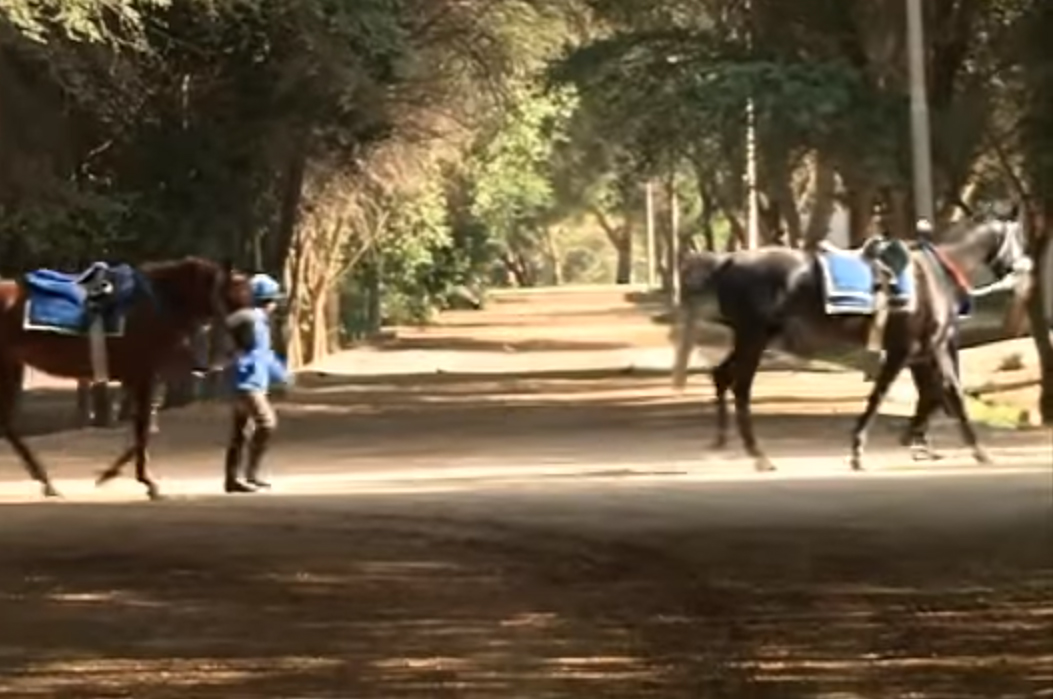
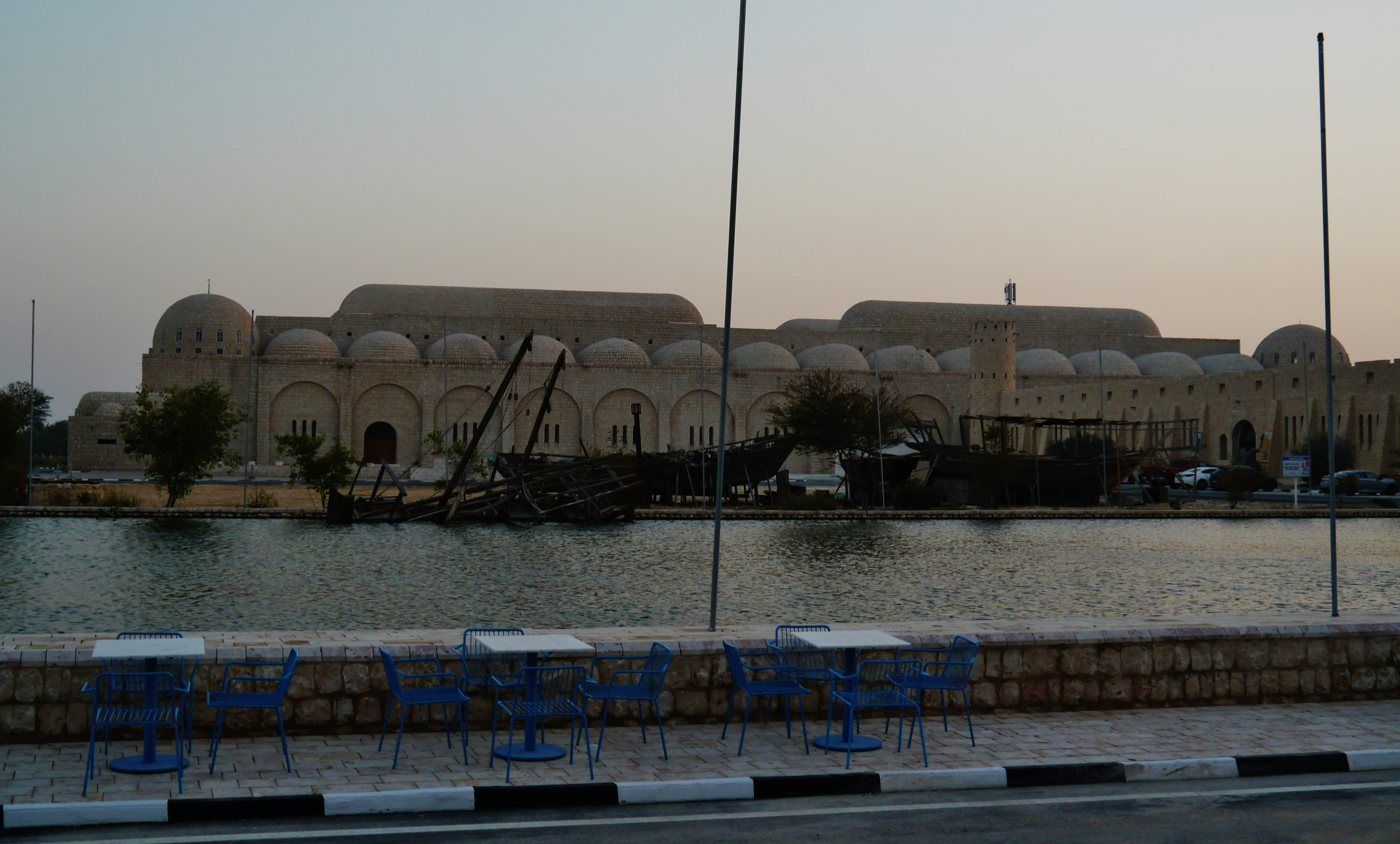
- View of the Leaning Mosque and Sheikh Faisal Bin Qassim Al Thani Museum A private mosque designed by Philip Johnson Al Shahaniya Camel Racetrack Al Shahaniya Stud Farm Exterior of Sheikh Faisal Bin Qassim Al Thani Museum

- Location within Qatar
- Coordinates: 25°22′20″N 51°12′17″E
- Country: Qatar
- Municipality: Al-Shahaniya
- Zone: Zone 80
- District no.: 451

Area
  - Total: 39 km^{2} (15 sq mi)

Al-Shahaniya City (Arabic: مدينة الشحانية, romanized: Madīnat ash-Shīḥānīyah) is a city in Qatar, located in the similarly named municipality of Al-Shahaniya. It is approximately 30 kilometres (19 mi) from the capital Doha, serving as the rough midpoint between Doha and the industrial city of Dukhan.

Qatar's most notable camel racetrack, Al-Shahaniya Camel Racetrack, is located in the city. Another notable attraction is Sheikh Faisal bin Qassim Al Thani Museum, which is just outside city limits and also hosts an oryx reserve.

== Etymology ==
Al-Shahaniya derives its name from a plant known locally as sheeh, which was valued for its anti-inflammatory effects. It is also spelled Al-Sheehaniya. The plant's Latin name is Artemisia inculta; it is an aromatic perennial that frequently grows in the Middle East and North Africa region but which is scarce in Qatar due to its unsuitable soils.

== History ==
=== 20th century ===
In J.G. Lorimer's Gazetteer of the Persian Gulf, Al-Shahaniya is described as a 'Bedouin camping ground' with a 35-feet deep masonry well yielding good water in 1908.

As part of an initiative by the Qatari government to provide free housing to its citizens, 86 houses had been built in the town by 1976.

In 1983–84, Al-Shahaniya was included as part of a major project by the Ministry of Public Works valued at QAR 535 million to develop sewage infrastructure in major settlements outside of Doha. In July 1985, the government announced it had begun a campaign to distribute fresh water to rural villages in Qatar suffering from water shortages. As part of this campaign, QAR 21,000 was allocated towards water distribution in Al-Shahaniya.

=== 21st century ===
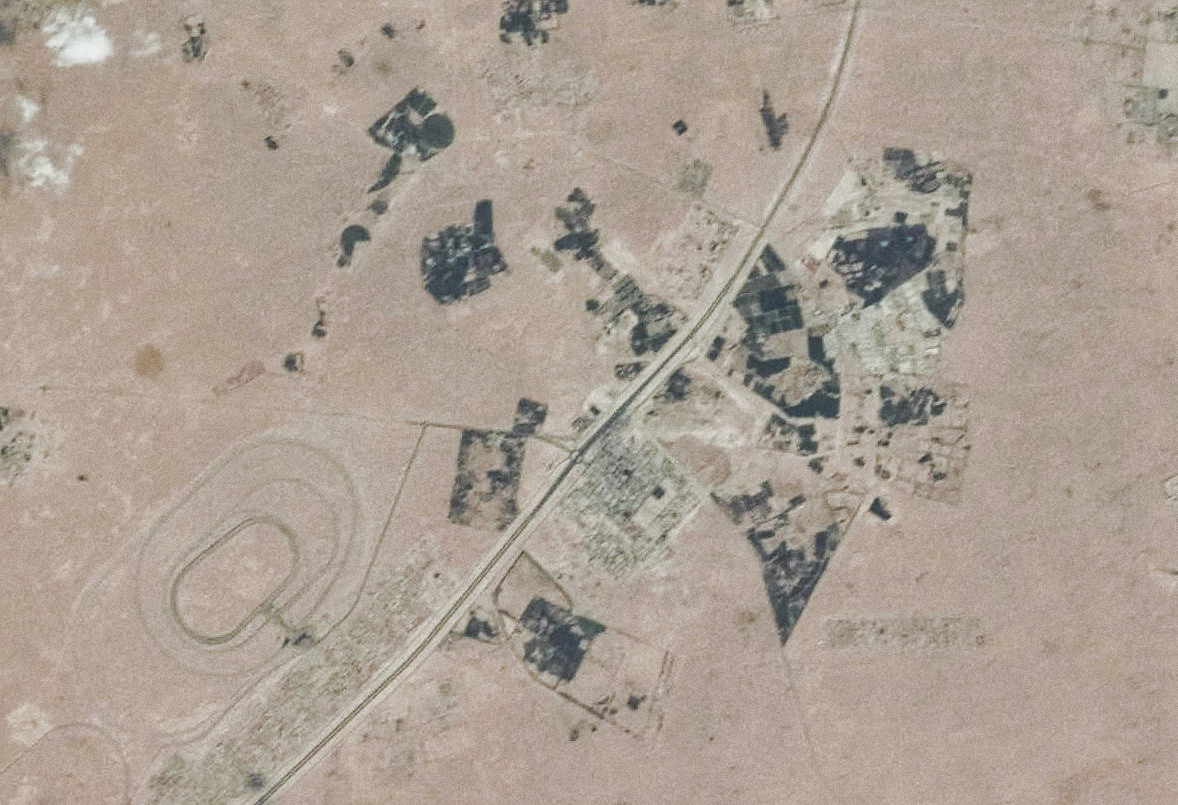
Satellite imagery of Al-Shahaniya City in 2010. The camel racectrack can be seen in the bottom left.

In 2008, the city was described as severely lacking in essential services. Only 40% of Al-Shahaniya and its surrounding areas had access to drinking water, with the remaining residents paying exorbitant prices to transport drinking water in water tanks. Furthermore, only 60% of the region had functioning sewage systems. As for the city itself, its main streets lacked any sort of lighting and were pothole-ridden mainly due heavy truck traffic. All roads within city boundaries, including the highways, had been constructed between 2003 and 2004 by Al Rayyan Municipality and had not been renovated since. There was no health center, though one was scheduled to open that year after many postponements. A lack of family venues and sports fields were also noted. At the time, none of the city's streets were named or numbered, causing significant difficulties for residents receiving mail delivery and emergency services. This was despite the Committee for Naming and Numbering Houses and Streets holding meetings on the issue since 2004.

Al-Shahaniya became the third city in Qatar after Madinat ash Shamal and Al Wakrah to join the UNESCO Global Network of Learning Cities in September 2020. It was recognized by UNESCO for its "plant a tree" initiative, in which the Ministry of Municipality and Environment (MME) oversaw the planting of 2,000 sidr trees along roads in Al-Shahaniya Municipality. Furthermore, it was also recognized for its solar energy project in Al Kharsaah and its preservation of native species such as the Arabian oryx at reserves such as Al Wabra Wildlife Preservation and the Al Dossari Zoo & Game Reserve.

== Geography ==
Al Shahaniya is situated in central Qatar. Nearby areas of interest include the village of Lehsiniya and the Al Dehailiyat Army Camp to the east, the village of Umm Leghab to the north-east and the village of Al Khurayb to the north. It is approximately 47 kilometres (29 mi) from Dukhan, 40 kilometres (25 mi) from Zekreet, 30 kilometres (19 mi) from Doha and 17 kilometres (11 mi) from Al Nasraniya.

The city forms part of the central zone of the central belt region. As part of this section, the area varies in elevation, the northern section containing more hills while gradually flattening out towards Al Shahaniya. To the west of the Al Utouriya-Al-Shahaniya Road, there is a notable change in the landscape, opening up into a wide, spacious plain.

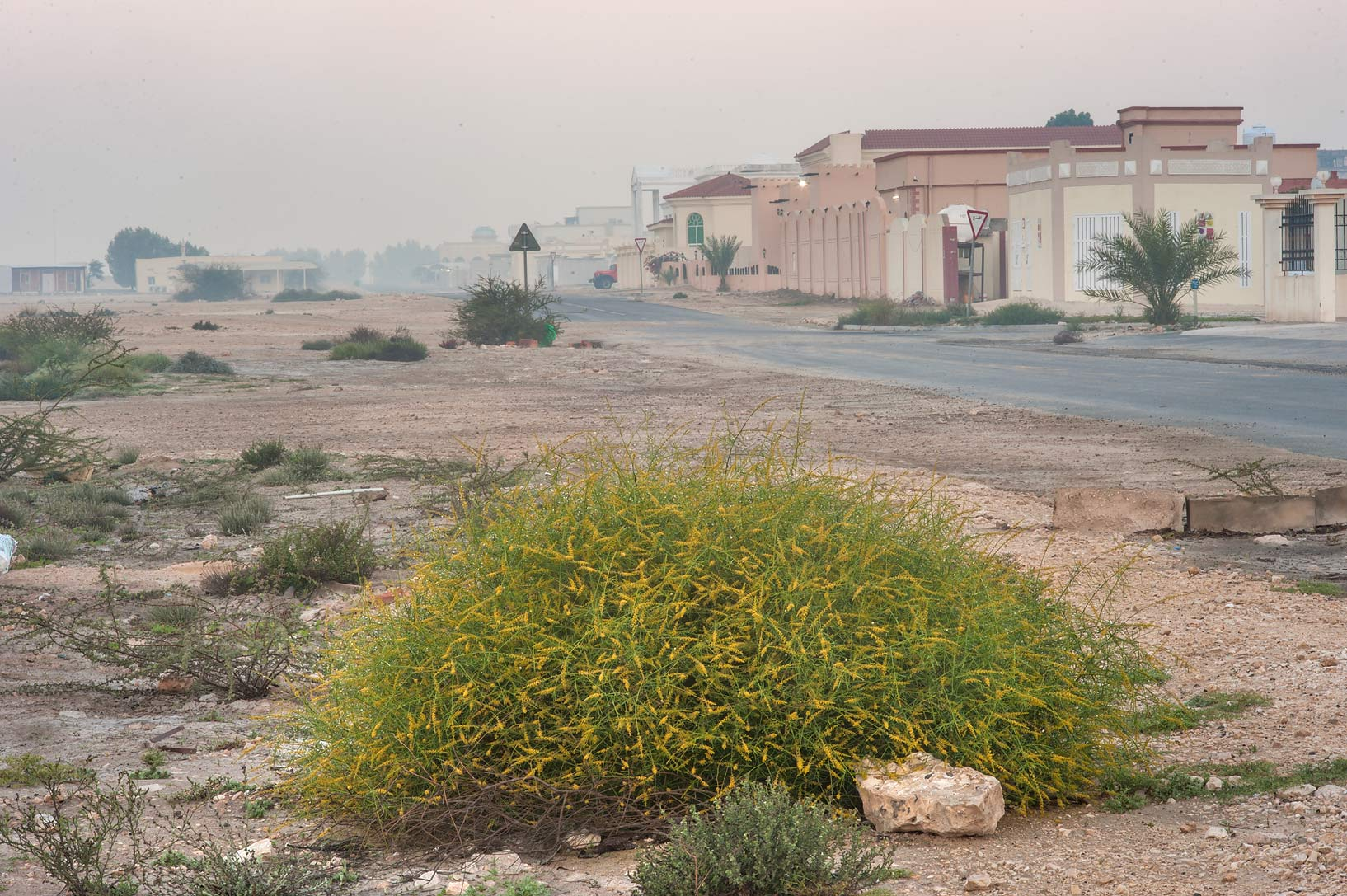
Roadside vegetation including shrub of Ochradenus baccatus

Common vegetation found in Al Shahaniya include fern-leaf peony (Fagonia tenuifolia) in sandy depressions, eyelash plant (Blepharis ciliaris), salam trees (Vachellia flava) in sandy depressions, rimth (Haloxylon salicornicum), sheeh (Artemisia inculta), Picris babylonica, Pulicaria sicula, Alhagi graecorum, and, on rare occasions, wild chamomile (Matricaria chamomilla).

The following areas are considered to be localities or extensions of Al-Shahaniya city:

- Al Samriya (25.355424°N 51.267881°E), a village that hosts the Sheikh Faisal Bin Qassim Al Thani Museum.
- Lebsayyer (25.396514°N 51.201332°E), also spelled Al Busayyir, a residential area south of the camel track.
- Al Fara (25.358681°N 51.221893°E), a farming area named after the rawda (depression) it is situated in.
- Al Braithat (25.347115°N 51.260215°E), a farming area named for its friable soil.
- Mazraat Al-Shahaniya (25.383282°N 51.230360°E), a farming area.
- Rawdat Al-Shahaniya (25.384285°N 51.225733°E), a rest-house located in a rawda.
- Wadi Baheesh (25.375209°N 51.205121°E), a farming area situated in a wadi (dry river valley).

== Infrastructure ==
=== Visitor attractions ===
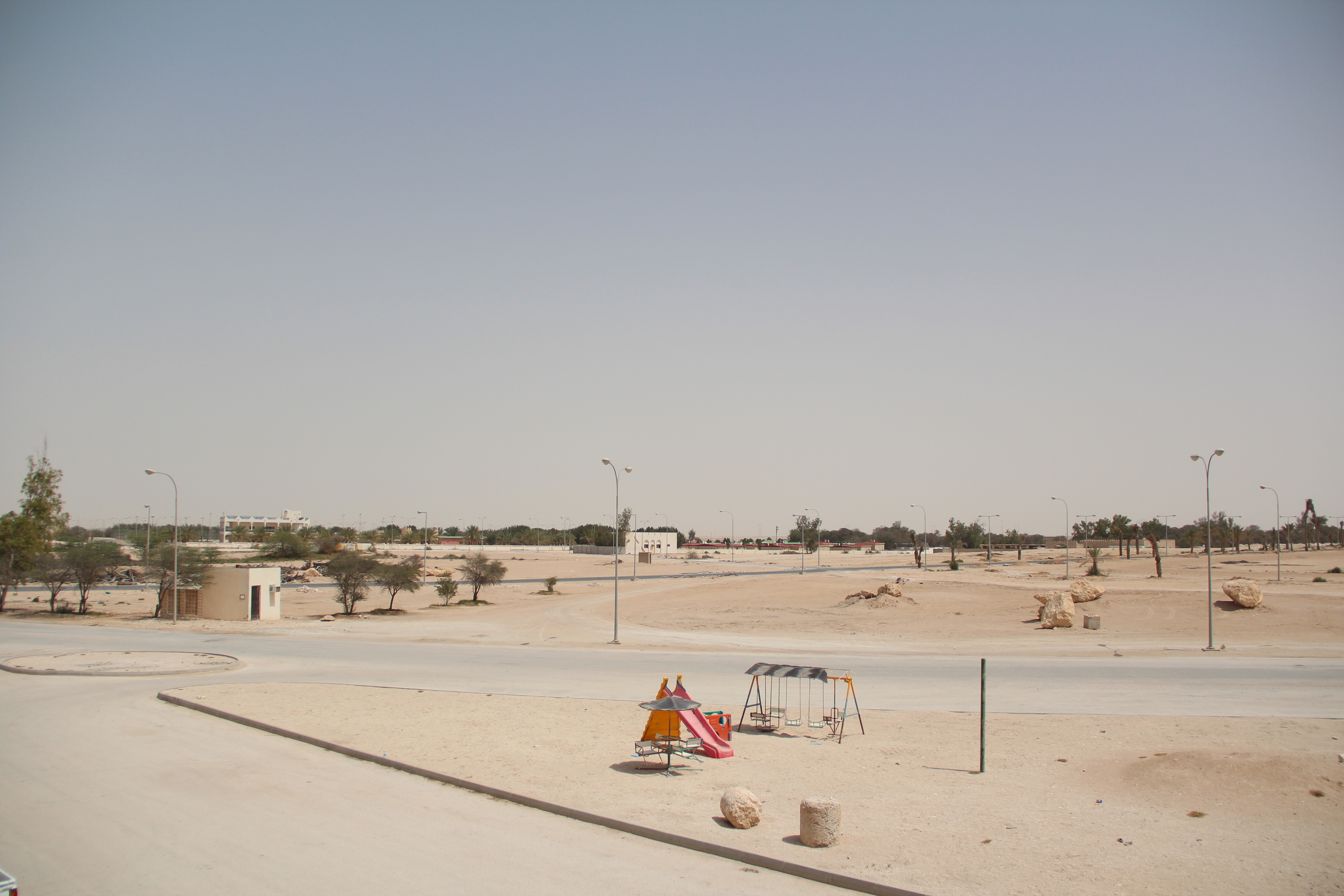
Rocky desert of Al Samriya near the Sheikh Faisal Bin Qassim Al Thani Museum

In 1979 Qatar's government portioned off a 12 km^{2} (4.6 sq mi) area of Al-Shahaniya as a sanctuary for Arabian oryxes, making it among the first protected environmental areas in the country. Oryxes for the reserve were transported from Muaither Farm by sheikh Abdulrahman bin Saud Al Thani. There were around 100 animals in the reserve in 1988. Aside from oryxes, there is an area of the reserve where red-necked ostriches are housed.

Sheikh Faisal Bin Qassim Al Thani Museum is a massive 530,000 m^{2} (5,7 million sq ft), 3-building museum established in Al-Shahaniya in 1998. It is located in Al Samriya, a locality of the city and is accessible through Dukhan Road. Adjoined to the museum is the Sheikh Faisal bin Qassim Al Thani Mosque, which is notable for its architecture, as it is leaning at a four degree angle, a similar angle to the Leaning Tower of Pisa.

Al-Shahaniya Park opened in 2014 over an area of around 26,000 m^{2} (280,000 sq ft). Facilities include a mosque, a football field, a volleyball court and a basketball court.

=== Government services ===
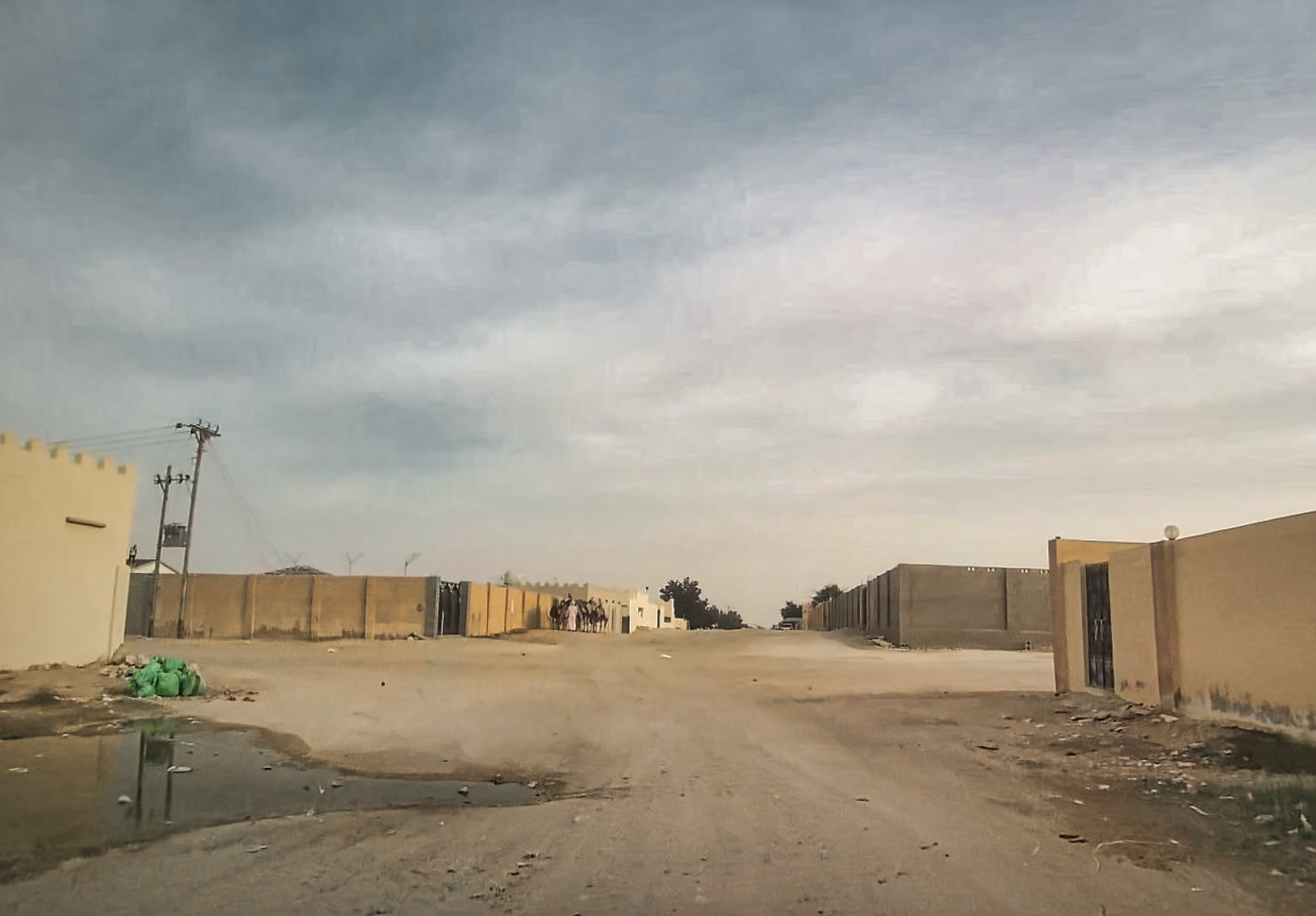
104 Street in the Lebsayyer area of Al Shahaniya

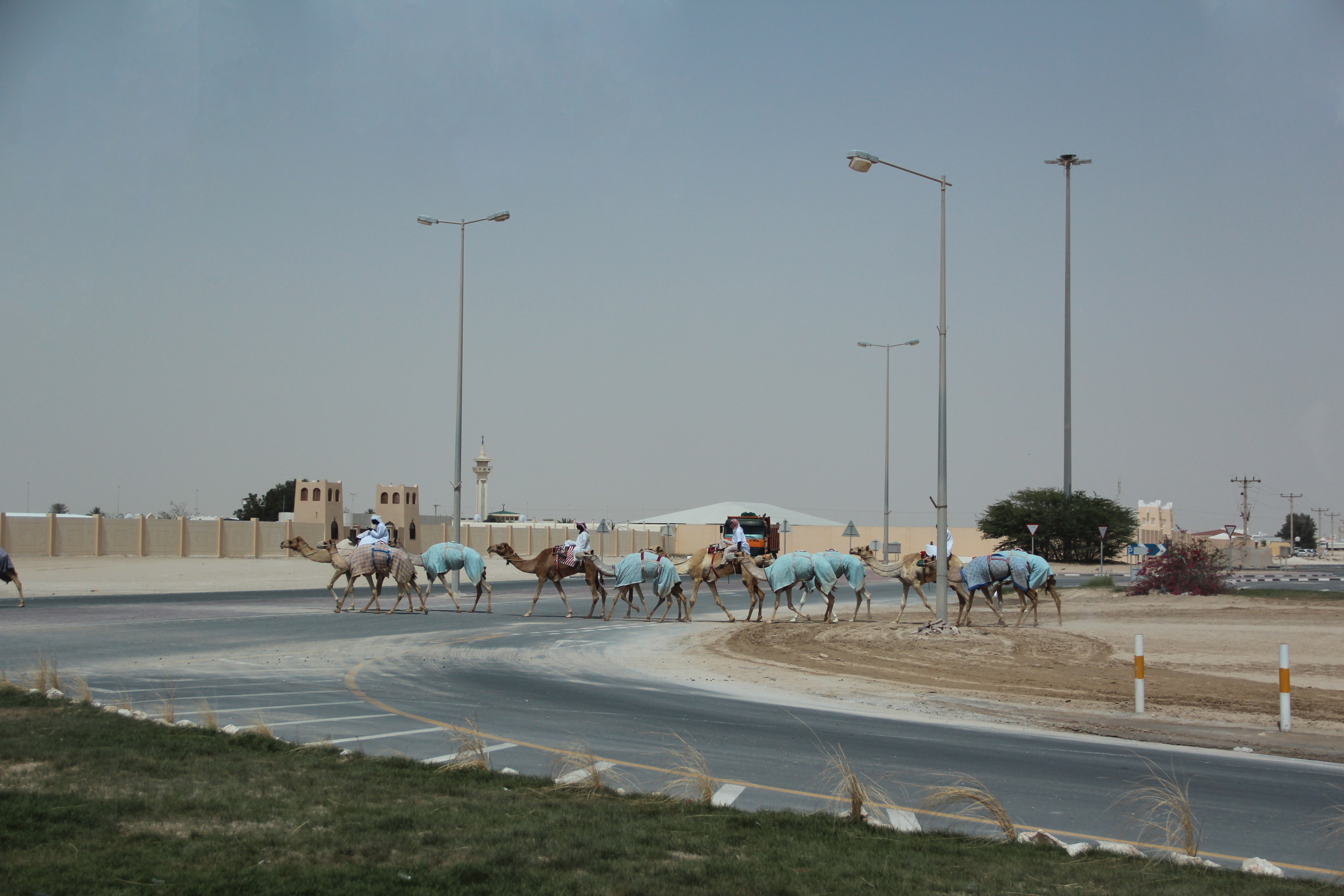
Camels crossing the road in Al-Shahaniya near the camel racetrack in the Lebsayyer locality

A wide-scale public defense complex was inaugurated in 2010. Branches of various security organizations are hosted in the complex, such as the Dukhan Security Department. Two notable buildings in the complex are the Shahaniya Services Centre, which manages passports and travel documents and the Shahaniya Civil Defense Centre.

North of the public services complex, off Al Utouriya Road, is the municipal headquarters. Qatar's Ministry of Agriculture has set up an Agricultural Services Center in the city.

In April 2018, the Animal Production Research Station was established in the city by the Ministry of Municipality and Environment. Spanning roughly 78,000 square meters and constructed at a cost of QR 30 million, its facilities include a research station, animal sheds and a veterinary clinic.

=== Healthcare ===
Healthcare in the city is served by Al-Shahaniya Health Center. Among its facilities are a dental clinic, a radiology clinic, a women's clinic and a general clinic.

== Economy ==
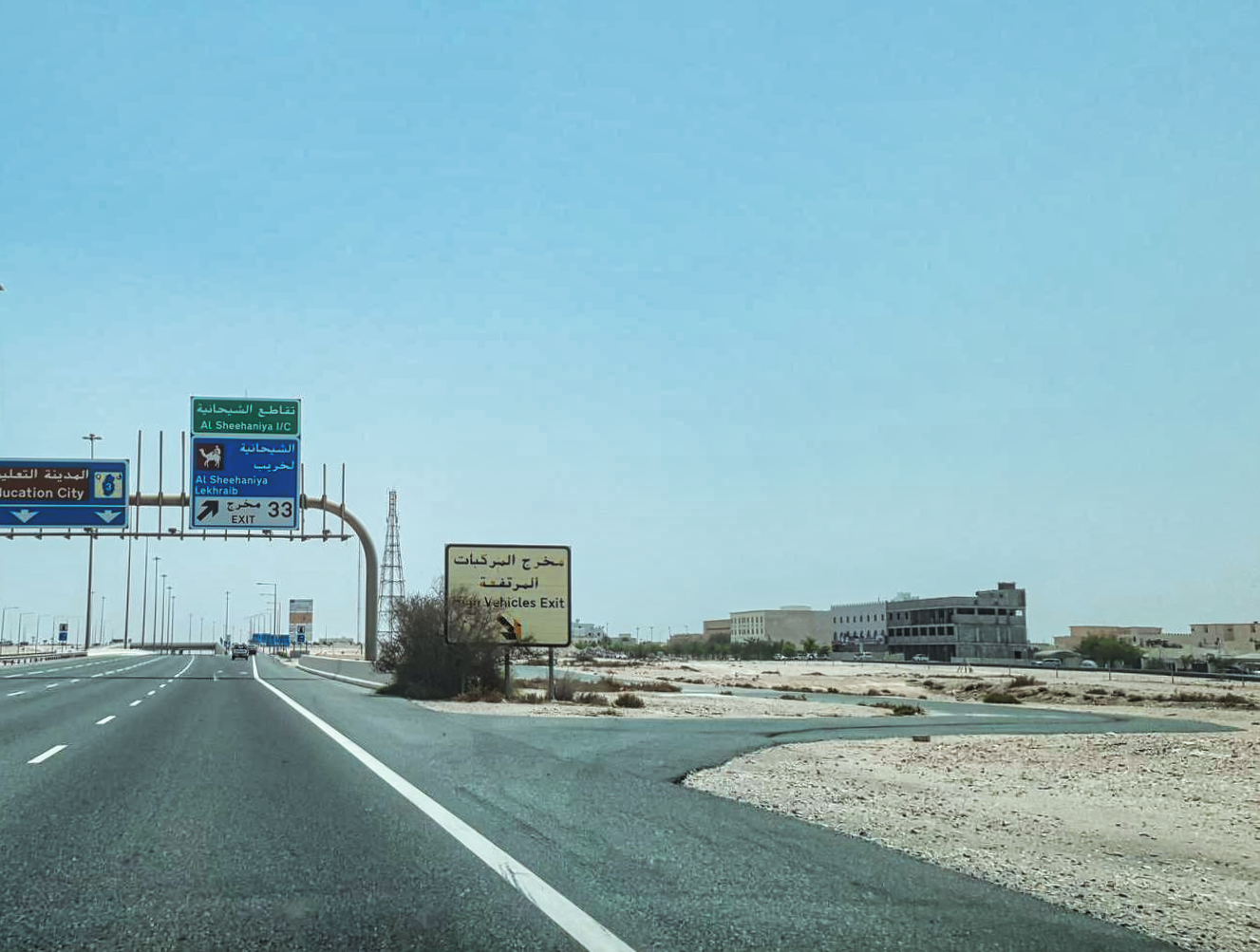
View of Al-Shahaniya from Dukhan Highway

=== Oil and gas ===
Natural gas and oil distribution pipelines and pumping stations are located in Al-Shahaniya City and several of its suburbs. There are several labor camps in Al Shahaniya.

=== Agriculture ===
The Arab Qatari Agricultural Production Company was founded in 1989 in the city.

Roza Hassad opened Qatar's first large-scale flower-growing facility in Al-Shahaniya City in 2012. Flowers are grown hydroponically, and seventeen different species were planned to be grown at the time of its opening. Production in its 5,500 m^{2} (59,200 sq ft) greenhouse is mainly oriented towards roses. The company has established shops in Doha where it sells its locally produced flowers.

== Sports ==
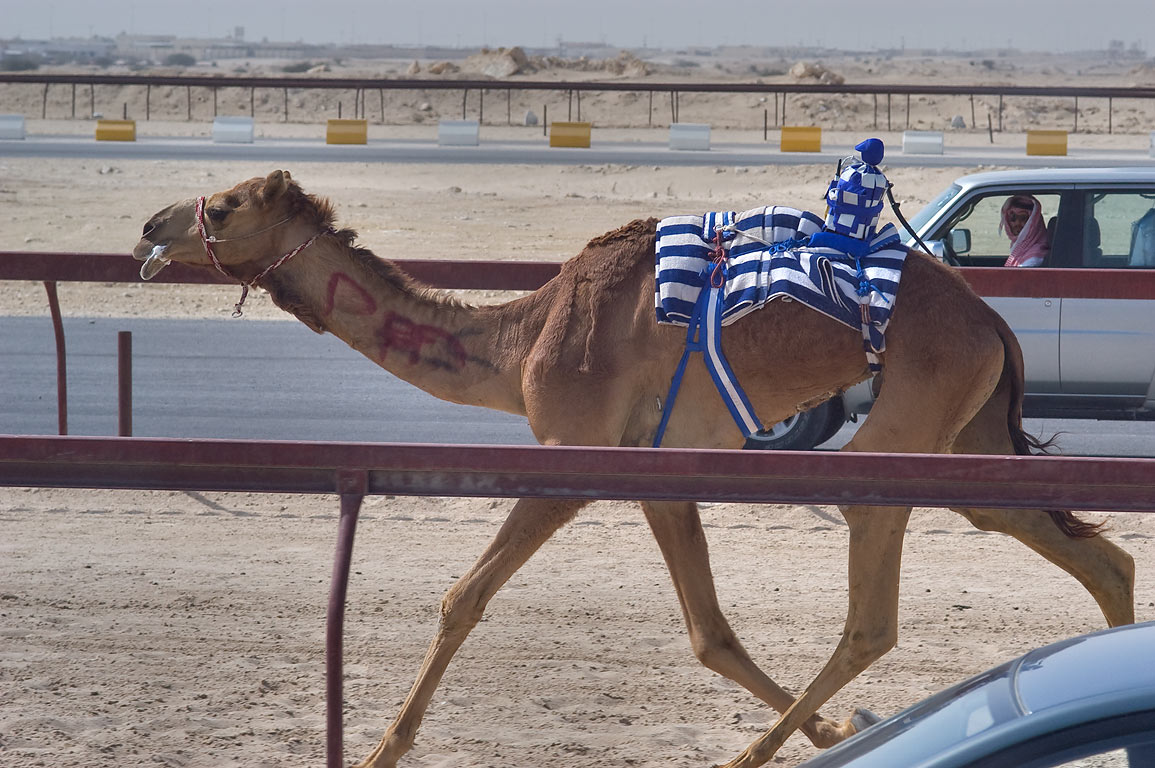
Robotic camel jockey at Al-Shahaniya Camel Racetrack

Qatar's main camel racetrack and camel training facilities are also located in Al-Shahaniya city. Robots are used to jockey the camels. One prominent competition that takes place on the track is the annual Founder Sheikh Jassim bin Mohammed bin Thani's Camel Festival.

Al Samariyah Equestrian Centre is located near the Sheikh Faisal Bin Qassim Al Thani Museum.

== Central Municipal Council ==
When free elections of the Central Municipal Council first took place in Qatar during 1999, Al-Shahaniya was designated the seat of constituency no. 24. It would remain the headquarters of constituency no. 24 for the next three consecutive elections until the fifth municipal elections in 2015, when it was made the headquarters of constituency no. 23. Also included in its constituency is Al Khurayb, Al Nasraniya, Umm Leghab, and Lehsiniya. In the inaugural municipal elections in 1999, Faleh Fahad Al-Hajri won the elections, receiving 54.2%, or 149 votes. Runner-up that year was Ali Mohammed Al Dossari, receiving 45.8%, or 126, of the votes. Voter turnout was 86.8%. Shaher Saud Al Shammari was elected in the 2002 elections. He retained his seat successfully in the next elections in 2007. In the 2011 elections, Mohamed Zafer Al-Hajri was elected as the constituent's representative. Al-Hajri retained his seat in the 2015 elections.
