= Al-Shahaniya =

Municipality in Qatar

Al Shahaniya الشحانية (Arabic)
- Municipality
- Map of Qatar with Al-Shahaniya highlighted
- Coordinates (Al-Shahaniya City): 25°22′20″N 51°12′17″E
- Country: Qatar
- Capital: Al-Shahaniya City
- Zones: 7

Government
  - Director: Mohammed Saif Al Hajri

Area
  - Total: 3,309 km^{2} (1,278 sq mi)

Population (2015)
  - Total: 187,571
  - Density: 56.69/km^{2} (146.8/sq mi)

Al Shahaniya (Arabic: الشحانية, romanized: Ash Shīḩānīyah) is a municipality (3299 km^{2}) in Qatar, with its municipal seat being a city of the same name (39 km^{2}). Formerly in the municipality of Al Rayyan, but now an independent municipality, the municipal seat was delimited in 1988 by Law No. 22. In 2014, the cabinet ratified a draft amending provisions to the 1988 law that formalized Al Shahaniya as Qatar's eighth municipality.

== Etymology ==
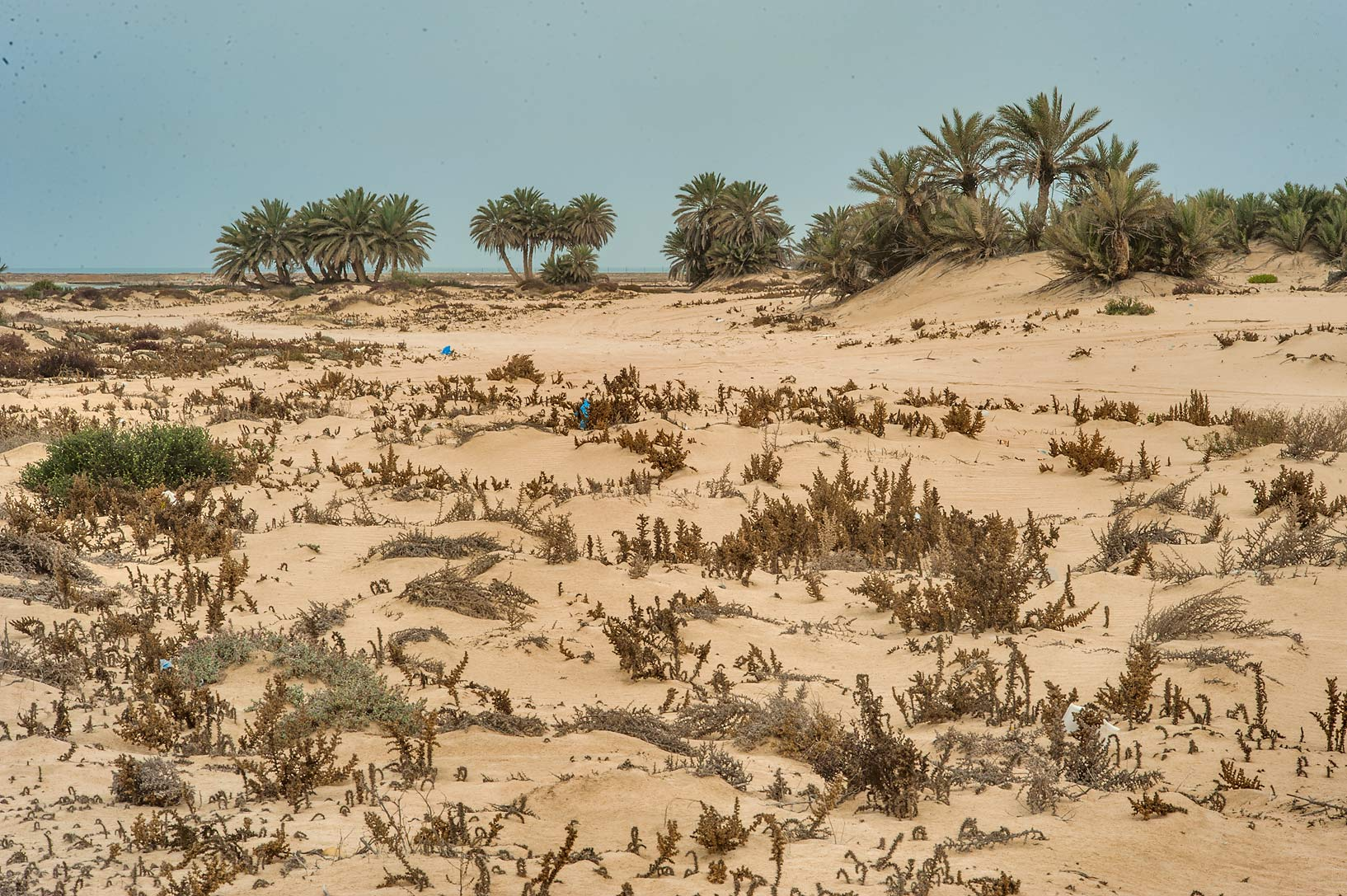
Beach sands in the vicinity of Al Hamlah Water Well near Umm Bab

Al-Shahaniya derives its name from a plant known locally as sheeh, which was valued for its anti-inflammatory properties. A variation of this name is Al-Sheehaniya. The plant's Latin name is Artemisia inculta; it is an aromatic perennial that frequently grows in the Middle East and North Africa region but which is scarce in Qatar due to its unsuitable soils.

== History ==
In January 2014, Al-Shahaniya split off from Al Rayyan Municipality to form its own municipality. Integrating approximately 35% of Al Rayyan's area into the new municipality, some of Al Rayyan's western localities such as Al Gharbiam, Al Utouriya, Al Jemailiya, Umm Bab, Rawdat Rashed, Al Nasraniya, Dukhan and Al Khurayb were also included in the new municipality. In May 2015, the geographical boundaries of Al-Shahaniya were further delineated. On 9 September 2015, the Ministry of Municipality and Environment (MME) appointed Rashid Al Nuaimi, who was also director of Al Rayyan Municipality, as the interim director of the municipality. He was replaced as director by Mohammed Saif Al-Hajri in July 2016.

== Geography ==
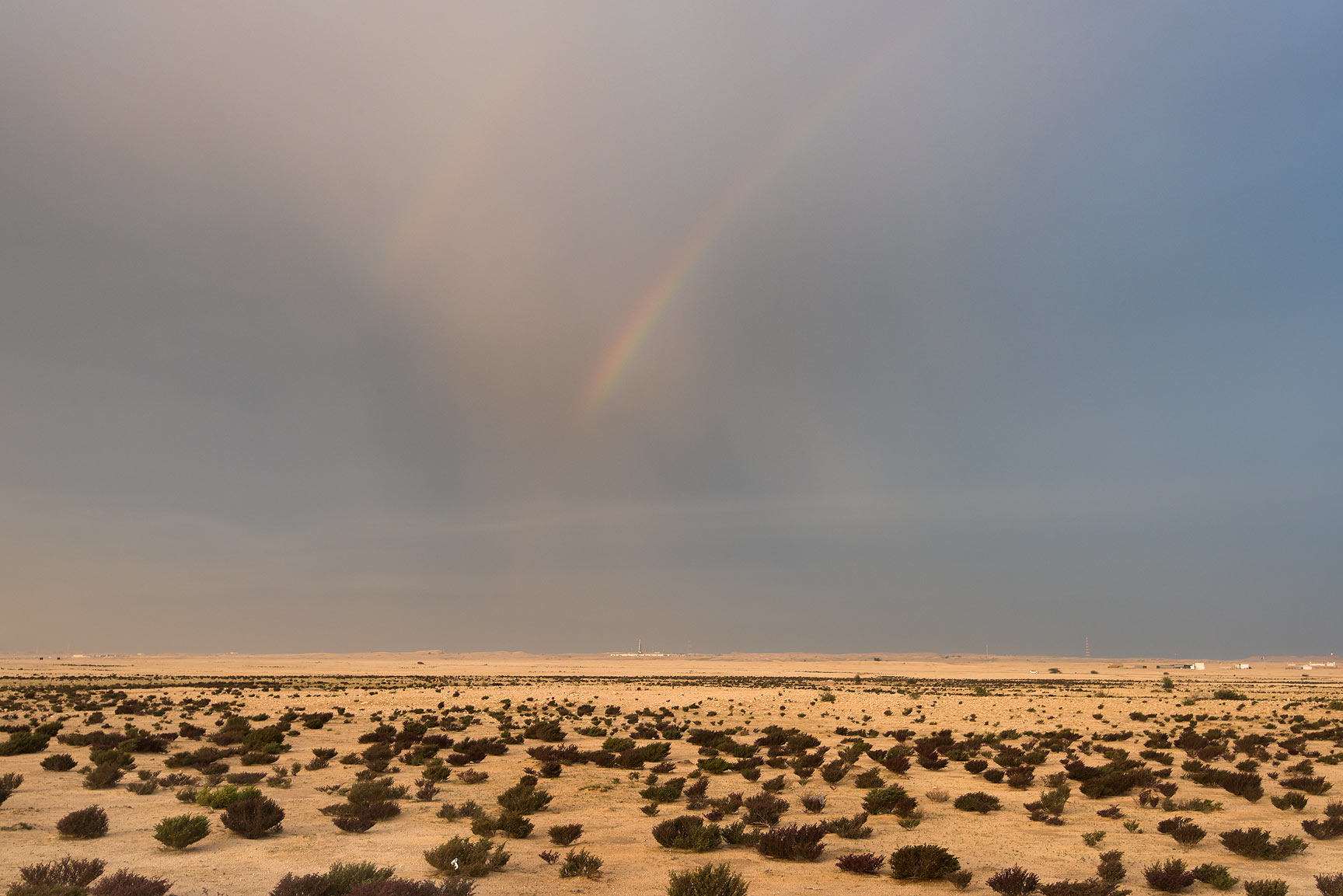
Rainbow over Rawdat Jarrah, a depression north of Dukhan.

The municipality is well known for its sunken land-surfaces and vast plains. As such, there are upwards of 40 plains and 487 rawdas (depressions), the most important being Rawdat Rashed. Other geographic features listed by the Ministry of Municipality and Environment include 169 jeris (places where water flows), 71 hills, seven highlands, 13 sabkhas, and 15 capes. Rocky hills and limestone cliffs are found abundantly around the general area of Dukhan. Only one island is found off its shores; that being Janan Island.

Much of the municipality is occupied by Al Reem Biosphere Reserve, and there are numerous small villages dotted along the reserve's main highway. These villages typically have less than a 100 inhabitants and were built over the few existing water sources in the region, as is often reflected in their names.

Al-Shahaniya City is the largest settlement in the municipality as well as in central Qatar. It is located halfway between Dukhan and the capital Doha, and is situated just off Dukhan Highway. As an urban center, it serves as a central location for surrounding rural settlements, such as Rawdat Rashed and Al Khurayb. The majority of activity associated with camel racing and oryx breeding in Qatar take place within the municipality.

To the west of Al-Shahaniya is Dukhan, which constitutes the most important western Qatari city. It is an industrial city and was constructed for oil extraction purposes. QatarEnergy is chiefly responsible for the city's development and administration. Portions of Dukhan have expanded outside of the concession boundaries; these sections are controlled by the Ministry of Municipality and Environment.

== Administrative divisions ==
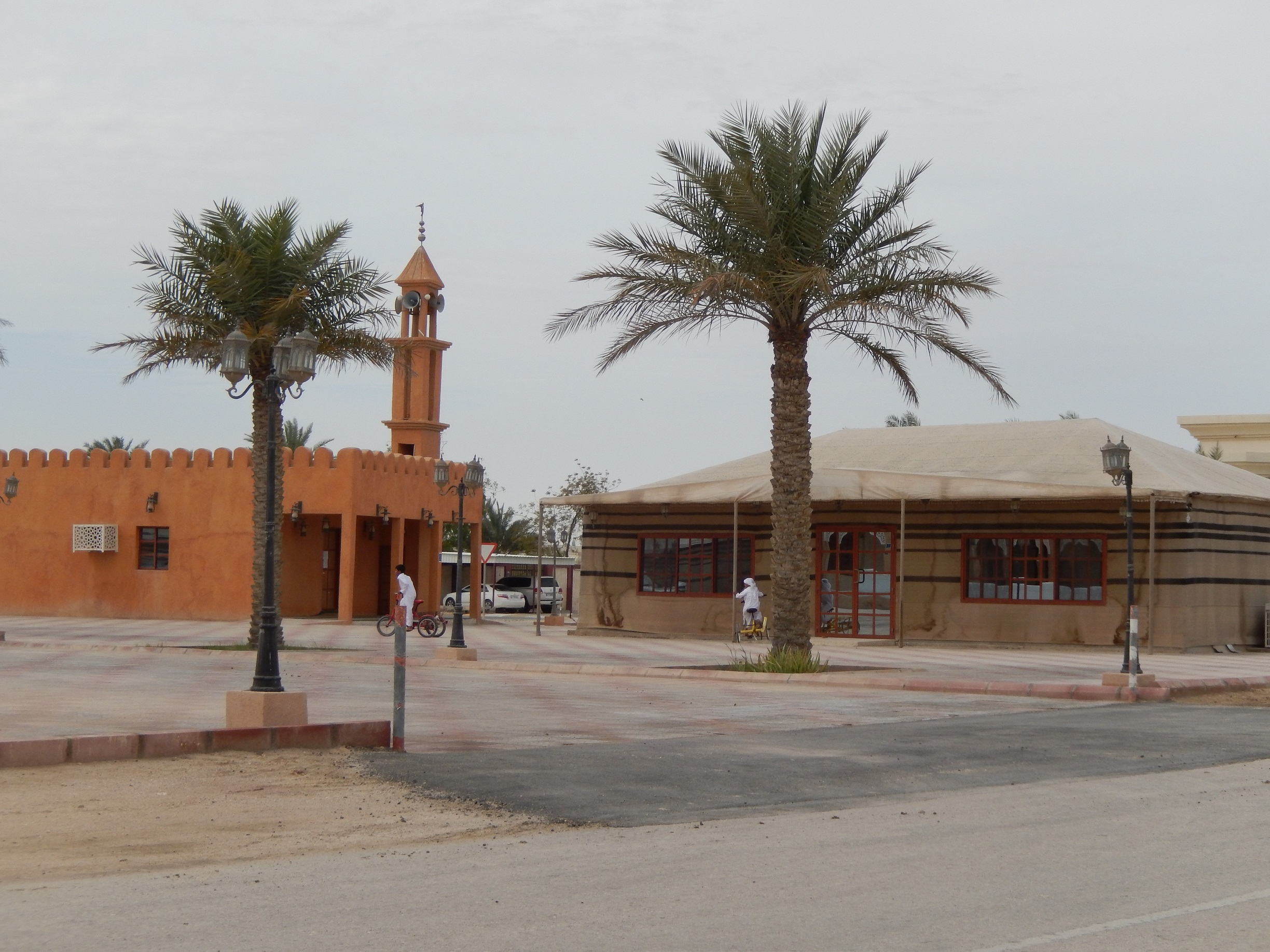
Village of Al Khurayb

The municipality is divided into 7 zones which are then divided into 467 blocks.

=== Administrative zones ===
The following zones were recorded in the 2015 population census:

Zone no.	Census districts	Area (km²)	Population (2015)
72	Al Utouriya	662.2	1,232
73	Al Jemailiya	623.3	1,685
80	Al-Shahaniya City	287.1	138,509
82	Rawdat Rashed	454.1	26,258
84	Umm Bab	494.1	5,305
85	Al Nasraniya	423.2	1,308
86	Dukhan	365	13,274
Municipality		3309	187,571

=== Districts ===
Other settlements in Al Shahaniya include:

- Abu Nakhla (Arabic: أبو نخلة)
- Abu Sidrah (Arabic: أَبُو سِدْرَة)
- Afjan (Arabic: عفجان)
- Al Hamla (Arabic: الهملة)
- Al Kharsaah (Arabic: الخرسعة)
- Al Khattiya (Arabic: الخطية)
- Al Khurayb (Arabic: الخريب)
- Al Qa'iya (Arabic: القاعيه)
- Al Ruwais West (Arabic: الرويس الغربية)
- Al Sahla Al Shamaliya (Arabic: السهلة الشمالية)
- Al Samriya (Arabic: السمرية)
- Al Shabhana (Arabic: الشبهانة)
- Al Salamiya (Arabic: السلمية)
- Al Suwaihliya (Arabic: السويحليه)
- Al Zeghain (Arabic: الزغين)
- Al Owaina (Arabic: لعوينة)
- Jelaiha (Arabic: جليحة)
- Lehsain (Arabic: لحصين)
- Lehsiniya (Arabic: لحسنية)
- Madinat Al Mawater (Arabic: مدينة المواتر)
- Qaryat Al Refaiq (Arabic: قرية الرفيق)
- Qaryat Al Muhanna (Arabic: قرية المهنا)
- Ras Abrouq (Arabic: راس بروق)
- Umm Al Daah Khawzan (Arabic: ام الداه خوزان)
- Umm Al Maqarin (Arabic: ام المقارين)
- Umm Al Qahab Al Jadeeda (Arabic: ام لقهاب الجديدة)
- Umm Al Qahab Al Qadeema (Arabic: ام لقهاب القديمة)
- Umm Al Zubar Al Qibliya (Arabic: أم الزبار القبلية)
- Umm Al Zubar East (Arabic: ام الزبار الشرقية)
- Umm Ghuwailina (Arabic: أم غويلينة)
- Umm Lebrak (Arabic: ام لبراك)
- Umm Leghab (Arabic: ام لقهاب)
- Umm Leghab West (Arabic: ام لقهاب الغربية)
- Umm Taqa (Arabic: ام طاقة)
- Umm Wishah (Arabic: ام وشاح)
- Wadi Laswaq (Arabic: وادي لسواق)
- Wadi Lejmal Al Shamali (Arabic: وادي لجمال الشمالي)
- Zekreet (Arabic: زكريت)

== Economy ==
=== Oil and natural gas ===
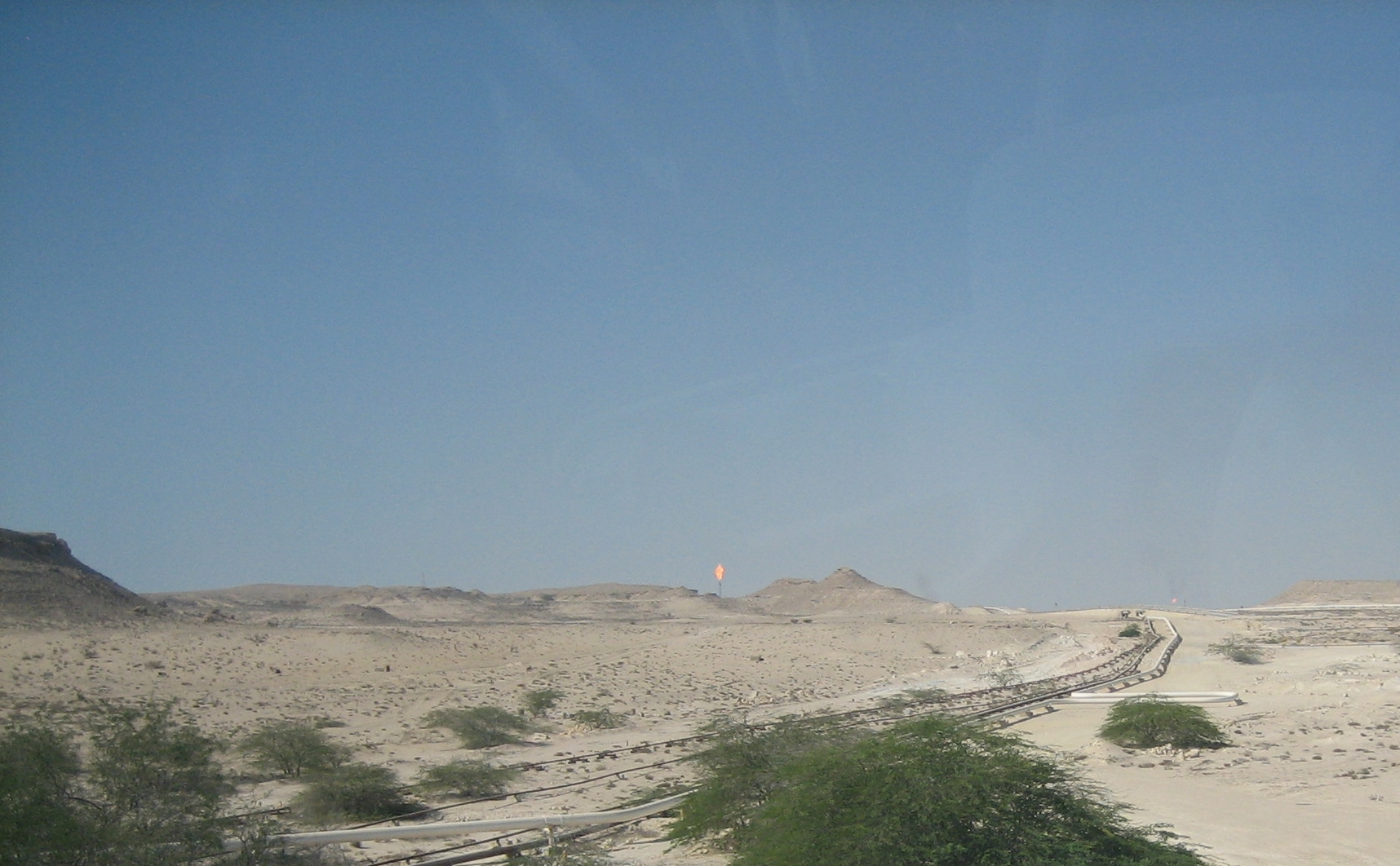
Pipeline system for Dukhan's oil wells

In the early days of oil and natural gas exploration, Dukhan was Qatar's most important industrial city. Oil exploration first took place in 1935; this was proceeded by Dukhan's first oil well drilling in 1940. Presently, Dukhan represents one of the four historic industrial centers of Qatar. In addition to its oil and natural gas processing facilities, Dukhan also hosts a desalination plant and a sewage treatment plant.

Natural gas and oil distribution pipelines and pumping stations are located in Al-Shahaniya City, Al Khurayb, and Mazrouah.

=== Manufacturing ===
South of Dukhan is the industrial city of Umm Bab. Aside from accommodating Qatar's first major non-oil related industry in the form of a cement processing facility which began operation in 1969, there also exists minor oil and gas separation facilities within the city.

A substantial government wellfield in Rawdat Rashed was historically used as a water source for Umm Bab's cement industry. Currently, Rawdat Rashed is one of the three major landfill sites in Qatar, being used mainly for construction and demolition waste.

=== Agriculture ===
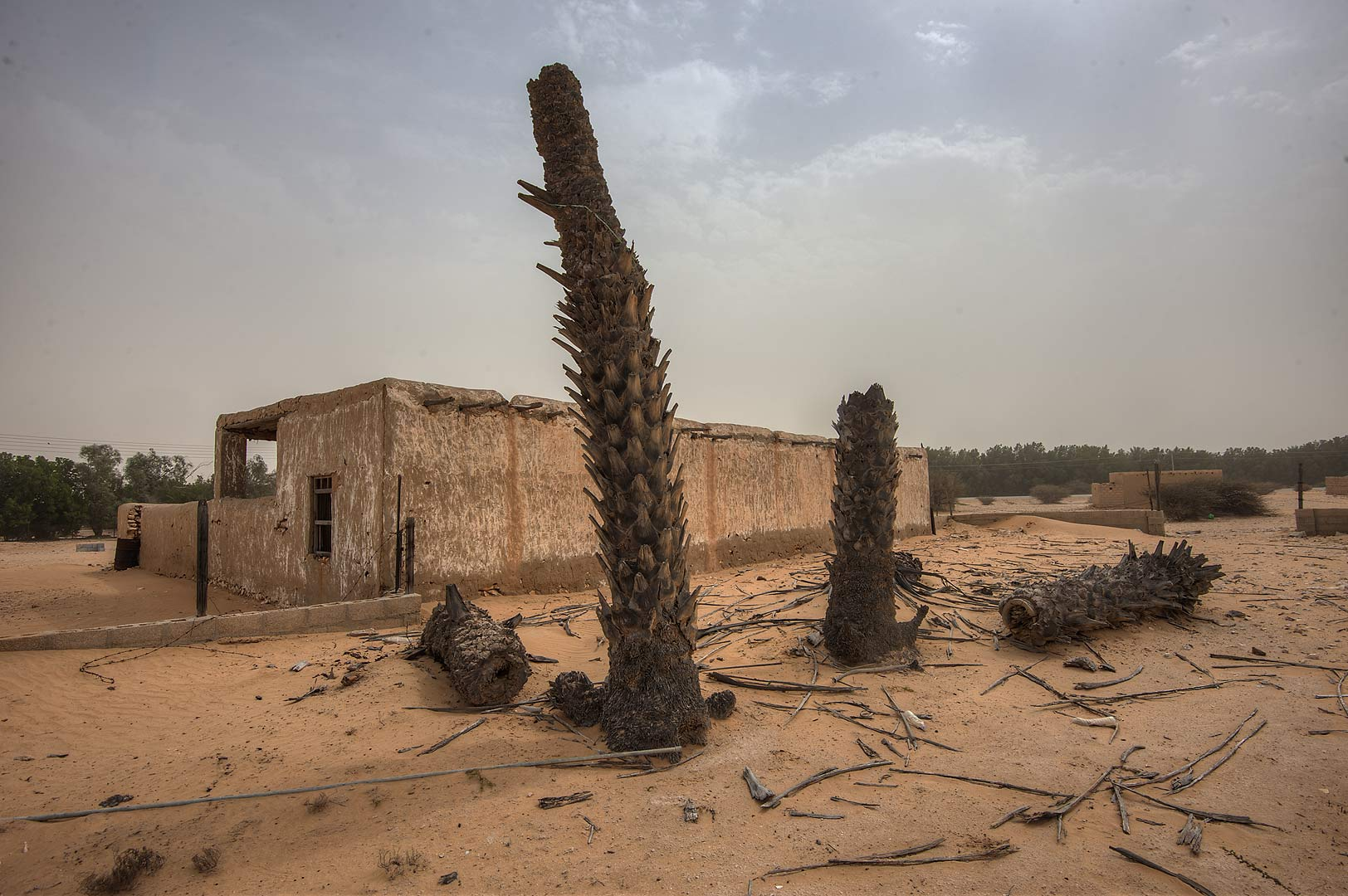
Palm trees on the outskirts of Khalil bin Mubarak bin Atiq Al Mansouri Farm in Al Jemailiya

Agriculture is scarce in Al Shahaniya's southern sector because of its lack of groundwater and unsuitable soils. Several farms are located near the aquifer system of Rawdat Rashed. There are also small clusters of farms near Al Jemailiya and Al Utouriya.

In April 2018, the Animal Production Research Station was established in Al-Shahaniya City by the Ministry of Municipality and Environment. Spanning roughly 78,000 square meters and constructed at a cost of QR 30 million, its facilities include a research station, animal sheds and a veterinary clinic.

There is a major government-owned plant nursery which spans over 2,500 sq meters in the village of Al Utouriya. Plants grown in this nursery are used for research and also distributed to government ministries.

In a bid to improve the country's food self-sufficiency, Al Faisal Holding announced in 2017 that it would be constructing a poultry farm in Al Shahaniya with a production capacity of 3.5 million chickens annually and 80,000 eggs per day.

== Education ==
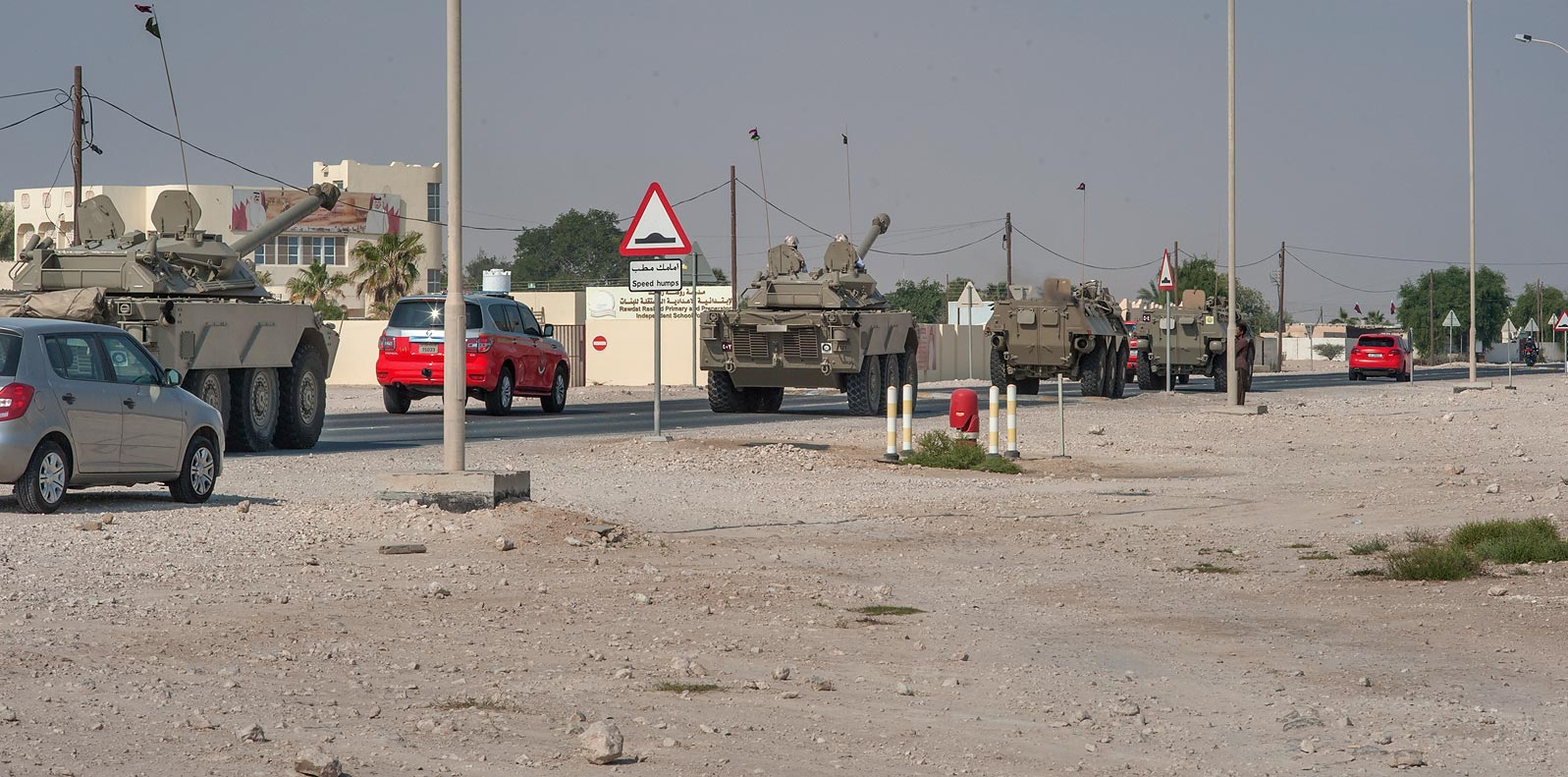
Military convoy near Rawdat Rashed Primary & Preparatory Independent School for Boys

As per the 2016 education census, thirty-one public schools operate within Al Shahaniya's boundaries. Of these schools, seventeen are exclusively for girls and the remaining fourteen are reserved for boys. Female students were numbered at 2,090, narrowly outnumbering the 2,036 male students.

Al-Shahaniya joined the UNESCO Global Network of Learning Cities in 2020.

== Healthcare ==
According to the 2015 government census, 8 healthcare centers operate in the municipality. In January 2012, Qatari officials, in tandem with the Cuban government, unveiled The Cuban Hospital in Dukhan. The hospital is located in the portion of Dukhan under municipal jurisdiction and serves the entire western region.

== Transportation ==
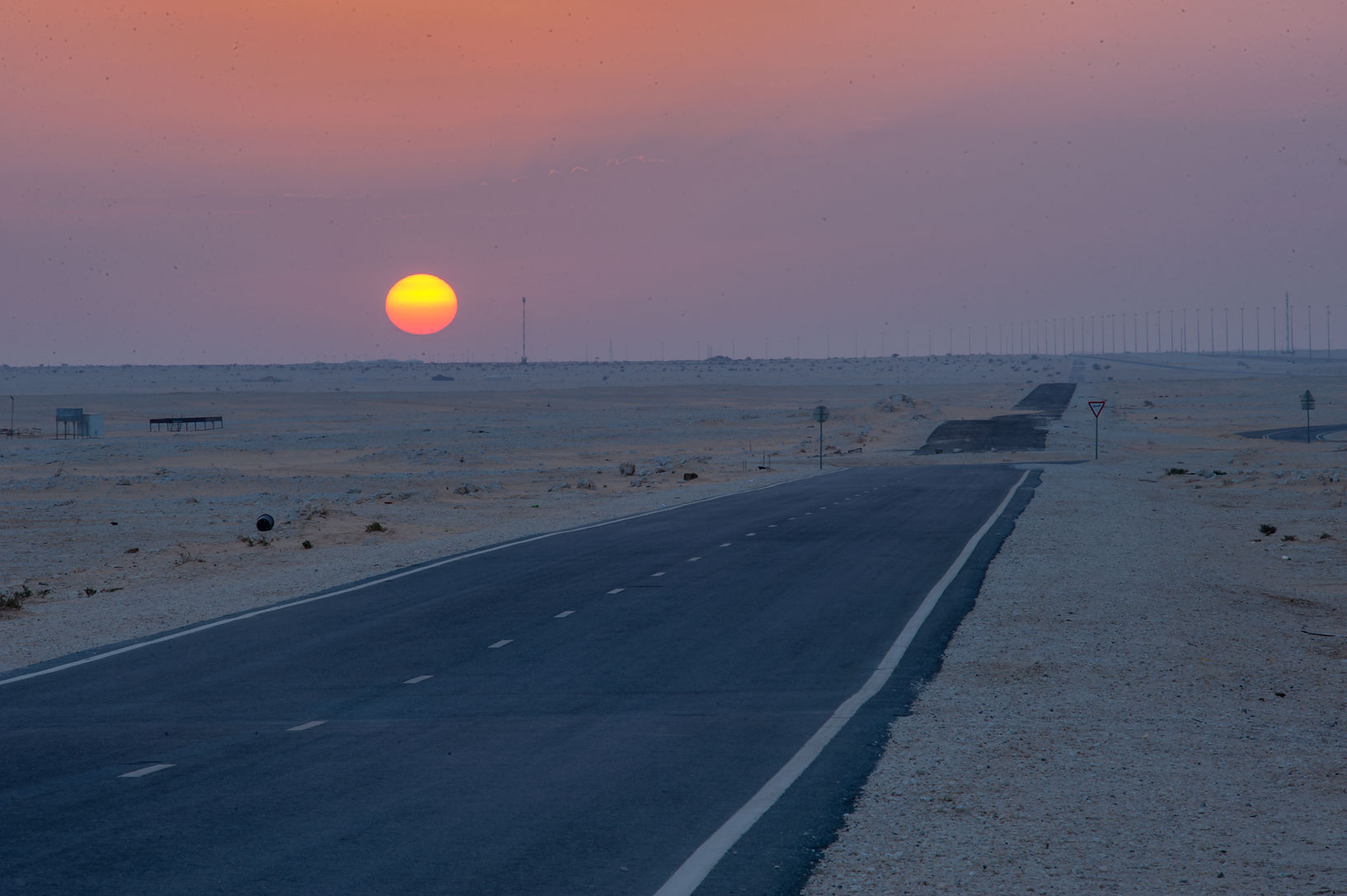
Service road near Dukhan Highway, between Dukhan and Al-Shahaniya City

Dukhan Road is the main road in the municipality, extending all the way from the capital Doha to Dukhan. Ashghal (the Public Works Authority) started a refurbishment project on the road in 2011. Works on the second phase were done in 2014, with new additions including two camel underpasses and a bicycle lane.

== Infrastructure ==
In Al-Shahaniya City, a wide-scale public defense complex was inaugurated in 2010. Branches of various security organizations are hosted in the complex, such as the Dukhan Security Department. Two notable buildings in the complex are the Shahaniya Services Centre, which manages passports and travel documents and the Shahaniya Civil Defense Centre. North of the public services complex, off Al Utouriya Road, is the municipal headquarters.

A military base known as Al Dehailiyat Army Camp is located in Al Dehailiyat, an area near Al Shahaniya City.

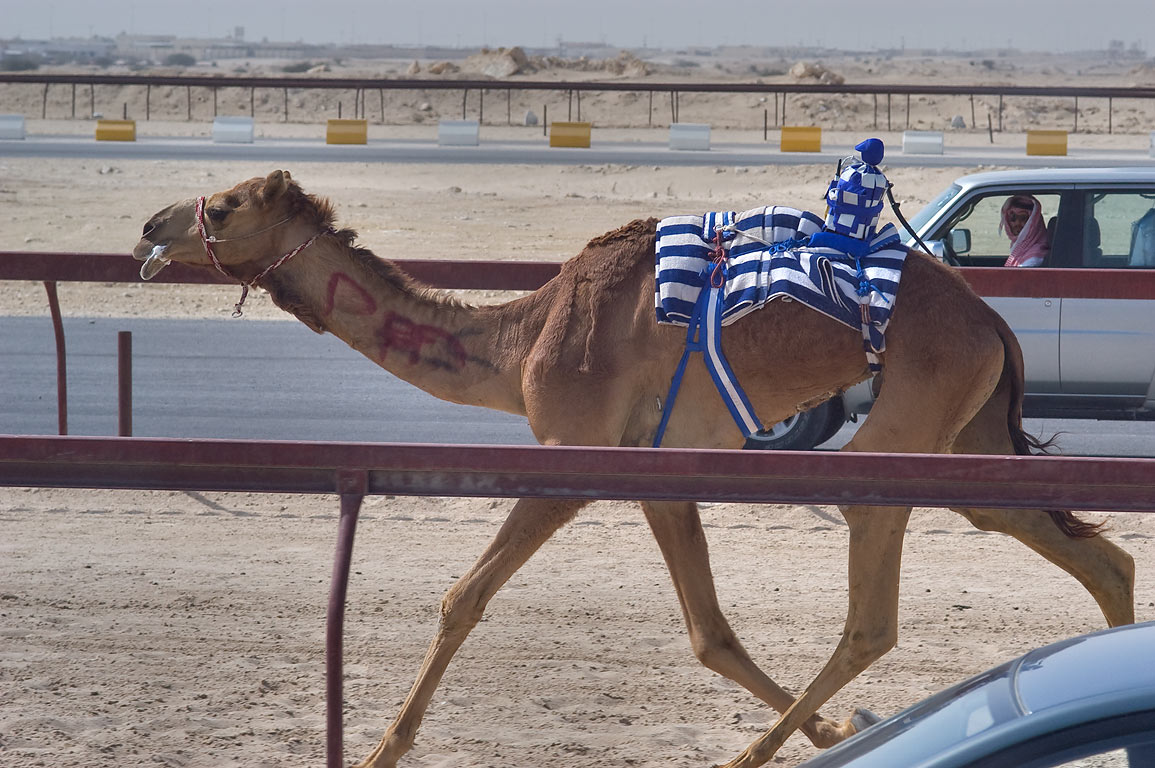
Robotic camel jockey at Al-Shahaniya Camel Racetrack

== Sports ==
Al-Shahania Sports Club is centered in the municipality. Formed in 1998, the club was originally based in Al Jemailiya, but shifted its headquarters to Al-Shahaniya City in 2001. It is most notable for its football team which at one point participated in Qatar's premier football league, the Qatar Stars League.

Qatar's main camel racetrack and camel training facilities are also located in the seat of the municipality. Robots are used to jockey the camels. One prominent competition that takes place on the track is the annual Founder Sheikh Jassim bin Mohammed bin Thani's Camel Festival.

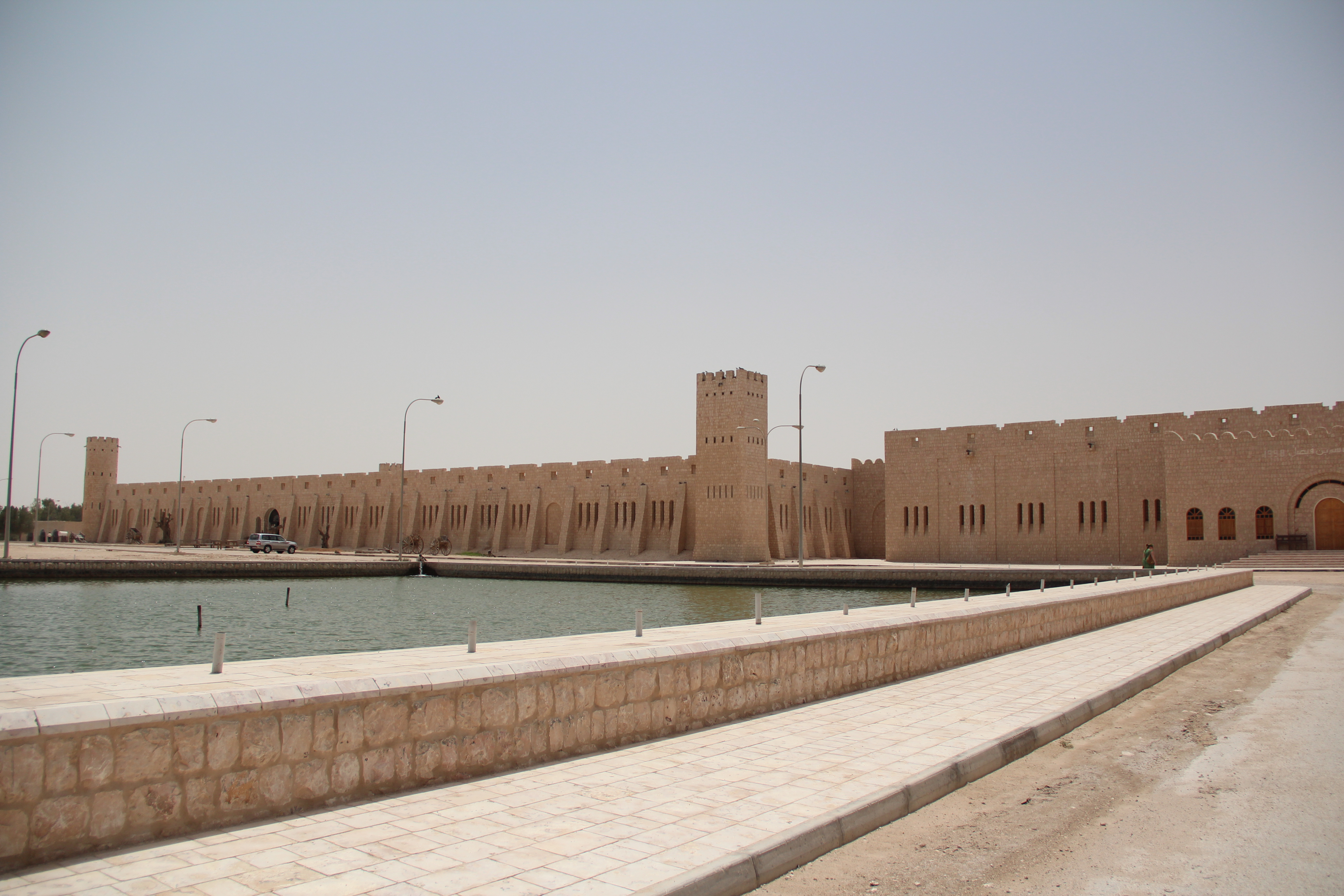
Entrance to the Sheikh Faisal Bin Qassim Al Thani Museum

== Visitor attractions ==
In 1979 Qatar's government portioned off a 12 square km area of Al-Shahaniya as a sanctuary for Arabian oryxes, making it among the first protected environmental areas in the country. Oryxes for the reserve were transported from Muaither Farm by sheikh Abdulrahman bin Saud Al Thani. There were around 100 animals in the reserve in 1988. Aside from oryxes, there is an area of the reserve where red-necked ostriches are housed.

Sheikh Faisal Bin Qassim Al Thani Museum is a massive 530,000 square meter, 3-building museum established in 1998 in the municipality. It is located in Al Samriya, a locality of Al-Shahaniya City and is accessible through Dukhan Road.
