= Al Shabhana =

Al Shabhana الشبهانة
- Village
- Location in Qatar
- Coordinates: 25.213459°N 50.938727°E
- Country: Qatar
- Municipality: Al-Shahaniya
- Zone: Zone 84
- District no.: 555

Area
  - Total: 7.6 sq mi (19.6 km^{2})

Al Shabhana (Arabic: الشبهانة) is a village in western Qatar located in the municipality of Al-Shahaniya.

It is located about 12 kilometres (7.5 mi) east of Umm Bab and about 7 kilometres (4.3 mi) southwest of Al Kharsaah. The city of Dukhan is approximately 28 kilometres (17 mi) northwest of Al Shabhana.

== Etymology ==
A plant known locally as shabhan, found in abundance in a nearby rawda (depression), gave the village its name.

== Sport ==
In the 2013 Qatar International Rally, Al Shabhana was included as a stage for the first time, and runs for 21.81 kilometres (13.55 mi).
