= Umm Ghuwailina (Al-Shahaniya) =

Umm Ghuwailina أم غويلينة
- Village
- Location in Qatar
- Coordinates: 25.148372°N 51.208958°E
- Country: Qatar
- Municipality: Al-Shahaniya
- Zone: Zone 82
- District no.: 489

Area
  - Total: 8.3 sq mi (21.5 km^{2})
- Elevation: 157 ft (48 m)

Umm Ghuwailina (Arabic: أم غويلينة) is a village in Qatar located in the municipality of Al-Shahaniya.

== Etymology ==
In Arabic, umm is translated to "mother", and is a common prefix that is attached to a name in order to signify a geographical feature. The second constituent is derived from ghulan, the Arabic name for a local plant. Ghulan is part of the Hammada genus of plants and is commonly used as fodder for camels.

== Agriculture ==
The Umm Ghuwailina Green Fodder Project was launched in April 2018. The project, located on an area of 191 hectares, is estimated to produce 2,700 to 3,000 tonnes of clover per year for use as fodder. Al-Baida Group developed and is overseeing the project with the assistance of government authorities. It is part of the many government-supported initiatives to increase Qatar's food self-sufficiency.
