= Zone 84, Qatar =

Zone 84
- Zone
- Interactive map of Zone 84
- Coordinates: 25.173102°N 50.898613°E
- Country: Qatar
- Municipality: Al-Shahaniya
- Blocks: 27

Area
  - Total: 494.1 km^{2} (190.8 sq mi)

Population (2015)
  - Total: 5,305
  - Density: 10.74/km^{2} (27.81/sq mi)
- Time zone: UTC+03 (Arabia Standard Time)
- ISO 3166 code: QA-SH

Zone 84 is a zone in the municipality of Al-Shahaniya in the state of Qatar. The main district recorded in the 2015 population census was Umm Bab.

Other districts which fall within its administrative boundaries are Al Hamla, Al Shabhana, Jelaiha, and Qaryat Al Muhanna.

== Demographics ==
As of the 2010 census, the zone comprised 220 housing units and 55 establishments. There were 6,194 people living in the zone, of which 97% were male and 3% were female. Out of the 6,194 inhabitants, 97% were 20 years of age or older and 3% were under the age of 20. The literacy rate was 96.4%.

Employed persons made up 96% of the total population. Females accounted for 1% of the working population, while males accounted for 99% of the working population.

Year	Population
1986	1,036
1997	1,829
2004	1,287
2010	6,194
2015	5,305

== Land use ==
The Ministry of Municipality and Environment (MME) breaks down land use in the zone as follows.

Area (km^{2})	Developed land (km^{2})	Undeveloped land (km^{2})	Residential (km^{2})	Commercial/ Industrial (km^{2})	Education/ Health (km^{2})	Farming/ Green areas (km^{2})	Other uses (km^{2})
494.05	19.56	474.39	0.15	12.39	0.00	0.20	6.82
