= Al Utouriya =

Al Utouriya العطورية
- Village
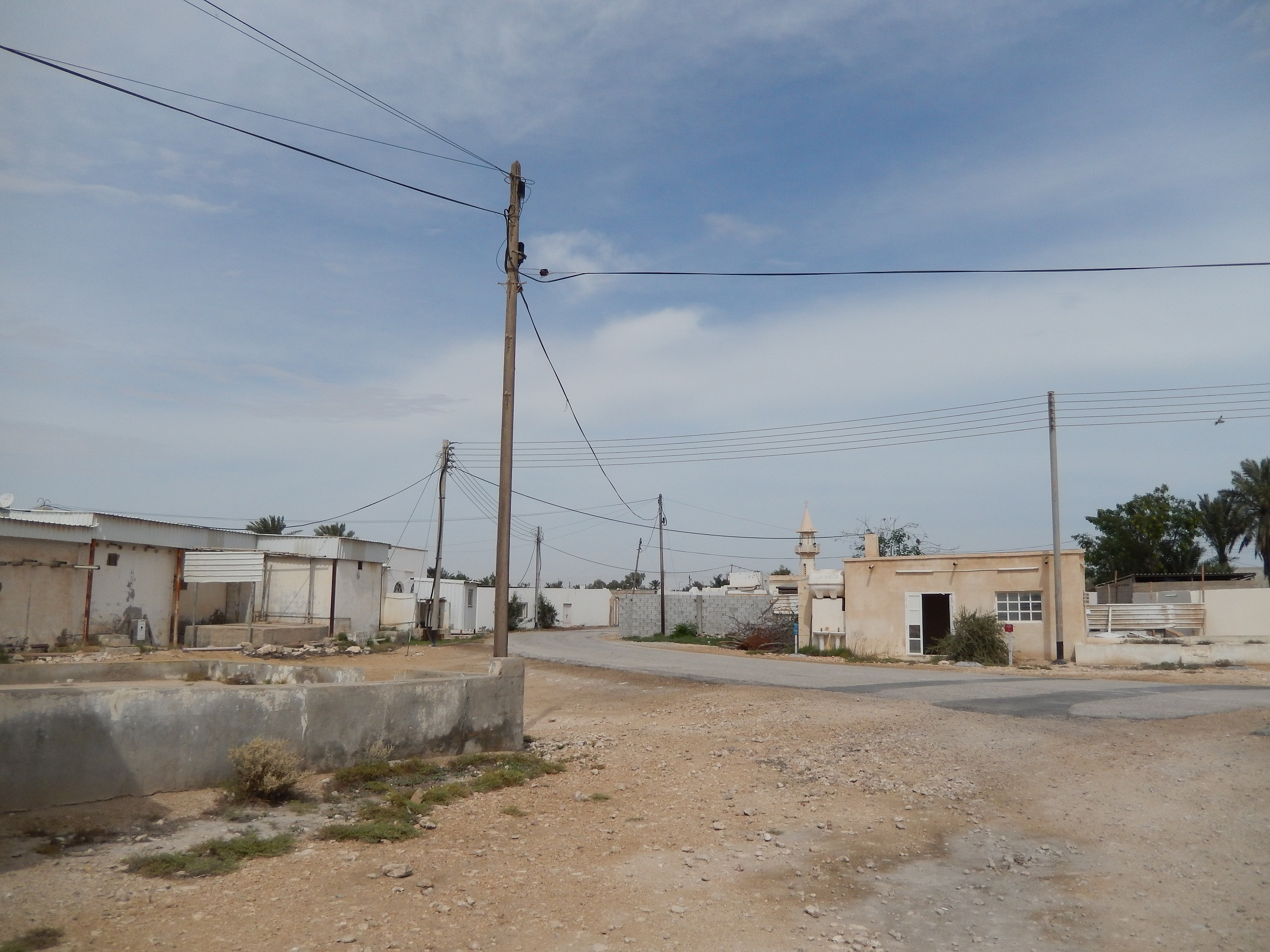
- Village scene in 2015

- Location within Qatar
- Coordinates: 25°30′54″N 51°12′11″E
- Country: Qatar
- Municipality: Al-Shahaniya
- Zone: Zone 72
- District no.: 158

Area
  - Total: 25.7 km^{2} (9.9 sq mi)

Population
  - Estimate (2016): 500

Al Utouriya (Arabic: العطورية, romanized: Al Athārīyah) is a village in Qatar, located in the municipality of Al-Shahaniya. The village lies about 20 kilometres (12 mi) north of Al-Shahaniya City and the same distance south of Al Jemailiya; it is connected to both by road.

It used to be part of the Al Jemailiya municipality before the municipality was incorporated into Al Rayyan. In 2014, the village was incorporated into the newly created Al-Shahaniya Municipality.

== Etymology ==
Al Utouriya's name is derived from the Arabic word ʿaṭar, which translates to "perfume" or "aroma". It was given this name due to the scent emanating from a nearby rawda (depression), which hosts a number of aromatic herbs.

Various alternative transliterations of the name exist, such as Al `Aţūrīyah, Al Atoriya, Al Athārīyah, Latariyah, and Leatooriya.

== History ==
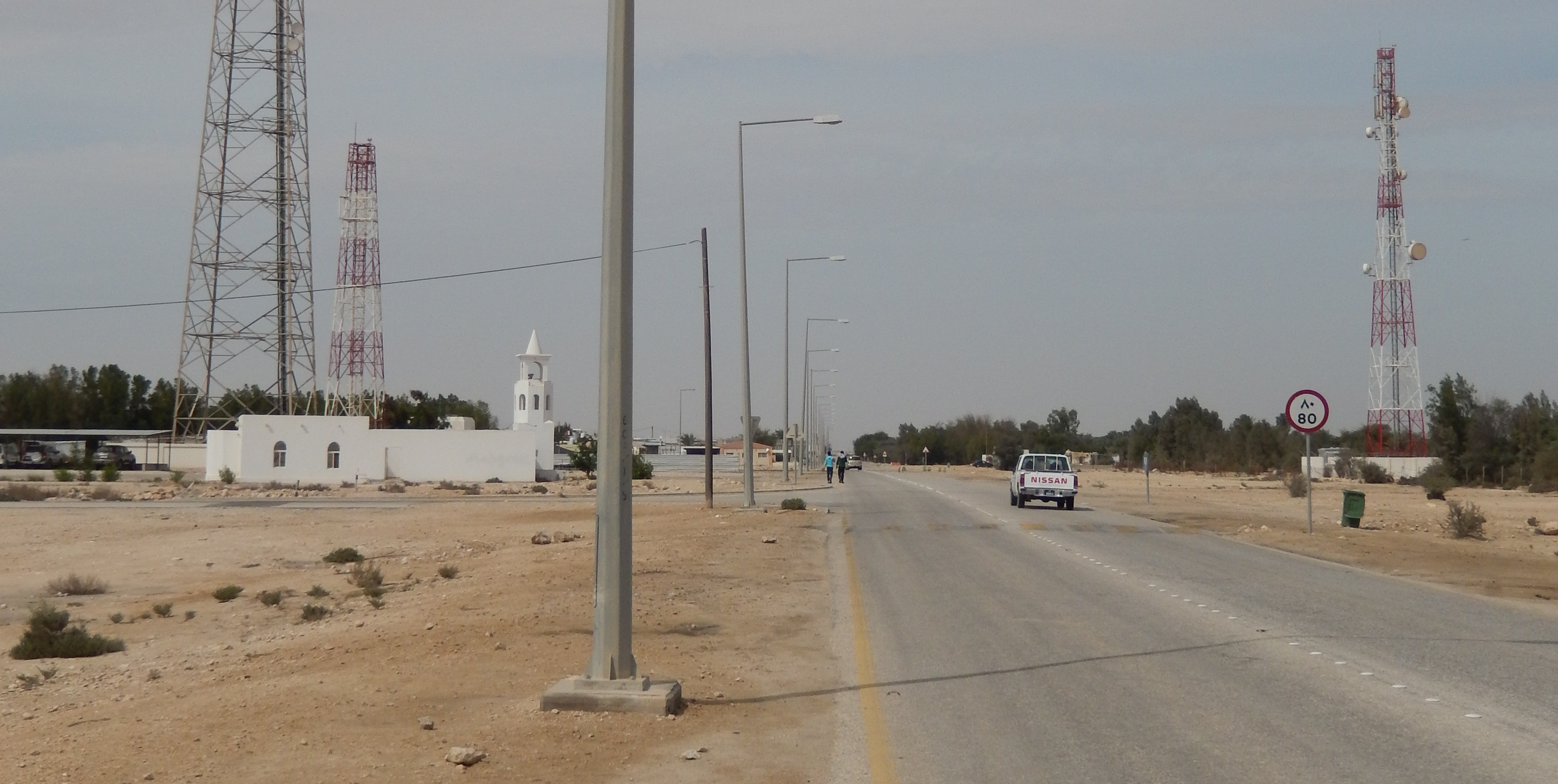
Main road to Al Utouriya

Settlers first came to the region in the 1960s, despite being cut off from many essential services. Many of these initial arrivals were members of the Al Murrah tribe, who were increasingly transitioning from nomadic pastoralism to fixed settlement. In the 1980s, the village was connected to Qatar's power grid system. Mixed-use farms comprise the livelihood of some residents, while others commute to the capital Doha and elsewhere for work. As a result of poor living conditions, many of the original residents have migrated to Doha. In 2016, it was estimated that around 500 inhabitants occupied the village, with an overall 47 homes being recorded, all of which are resided in by more than one family.

== Geography ==
Al Utouriya is in north-central Qatar. It forms part of the northern zone of the central belt region. As part of this section, the area has varied topography, including hills, plateaus, and rawdas (depressions), which distinguishes it from the flatter areas to the north and east. To the west of the Al Utouriya-Al-Shahaniya Road, there is a notable change in the landscape, opening up into a wide, spacious plain with distinct features.

== Infrastructure ==
The village is a rural community primarily centered on agriculture. No health care or educational facilities were recorded in the 2010 census. The village also lacks parks, schools, supermarkets and gas stations. For public services and food items, most residents travel to Al Jemailiya.

== Agriculture ==
An experimental farm was established here by the government in the early 1980s in an initiative to boost food self-sufficiency. The farm's greenhouses successfully extended the growing season of cucumbers, resulting in a yield of 140 kg in 1982, and a pursuance to build similar greenhouses elsewhere in the country. There is a large government-owned plant nursery in the village which covers 2,500 sq meters. Plants from the nursery are used in research and also distributed to government ministries. It was established in 2003. Numerous privately owned farms have also been established in the area, most of which are mixed-use and grow fodder crops in addition to raising livestock.
