= FBQ =

FBQ or fBq can refer to:

- Sheikh Faisal Bin Qassim Al Thani Museum, a privately owned museum in Al-Samriya, Qatar
- Bagworm moth, a family of moths, by Catalogue of Life identifier
- FBQ, a squadron within the No. 3 Flying Training School RAF in the United Kingdom; see List of RAF squadron codes
- Femtobecquerel, a unit of radiation equivalent to one quintillionth the amount of radioactive material needed for one nuclear decay per second
