= Al Samriya =

Al Samriya السمرية
- Village
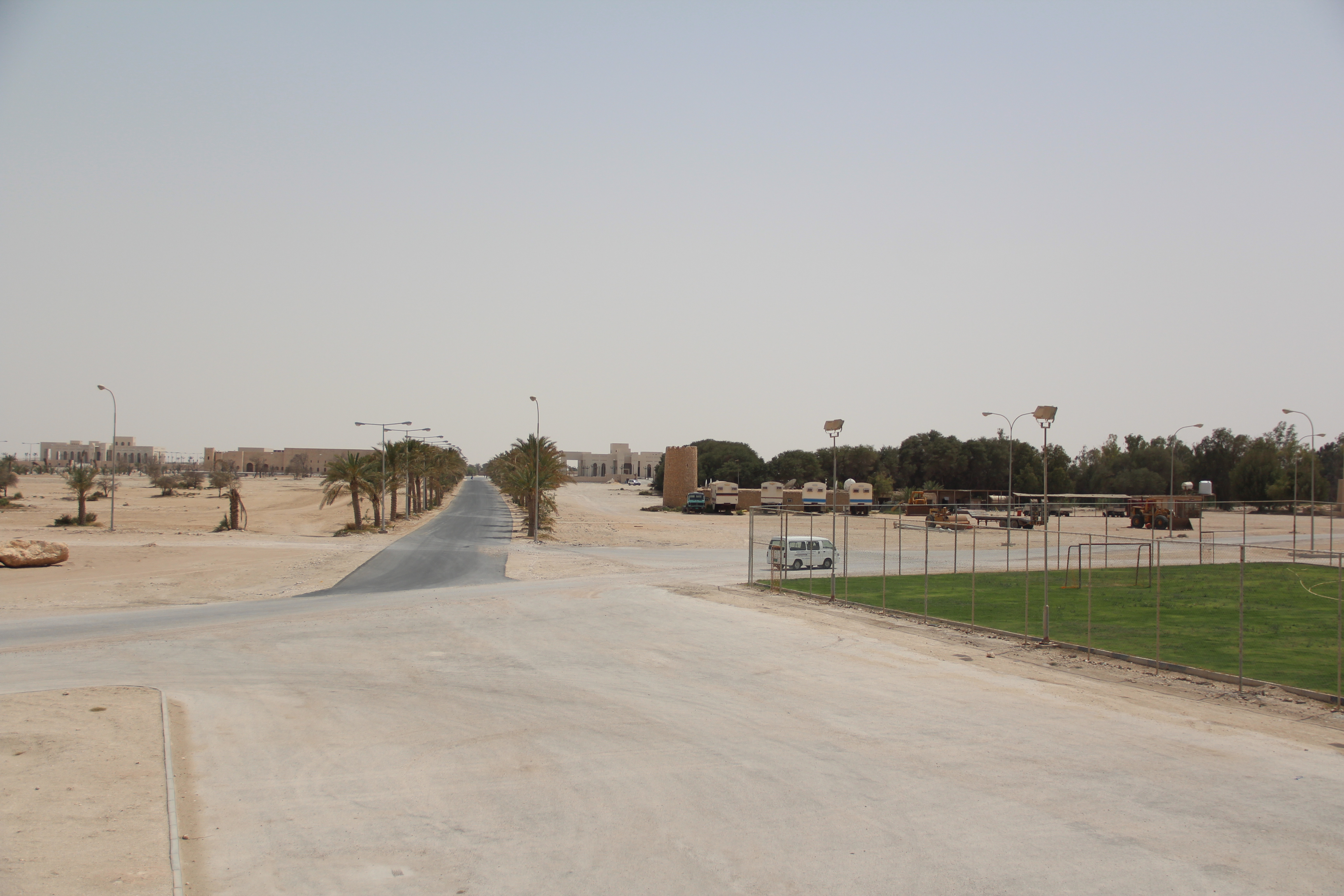
- View of the village in 2012

- Location in Qatar
- Coordinates: 25°21′53″N 51°16′51″E
- Country: Qatar
- Municipality: Al-Shahaniya
- Zone: Zone 80
- District no.: 215

Area
  - Total: 19.3 sq mi (50.1 km^{2})

Al Samriya (Arabic: السمرية, romanized: As Samrīyah) is a village in Qatar located in the municipality of Al-Shahaniya. It is considered to be a locality of the nearby city of Al-Shahaniya, which is the municipal seat. The Sheikh Faisal Bin Qassim Al Thani Museum is a notable attraction in the village. West of the village is the Al-Shahaniya Camel Racetrack.

== Etymology ==
Al Samriya derives its name from the Samr tree (Latin name Acacia tortilis), which commonly grows in rawdas (depressions) throughout central Qatar.

== Al Samriya Farm ==
A commercial 85-hectare farm is found here. In 1998, 20 hectares were used to grow crops such as cucumber, green beans and sweet peppers in eight greenhouses.
