= Al Khurayb =

Al Khurayb الخريب
- Village
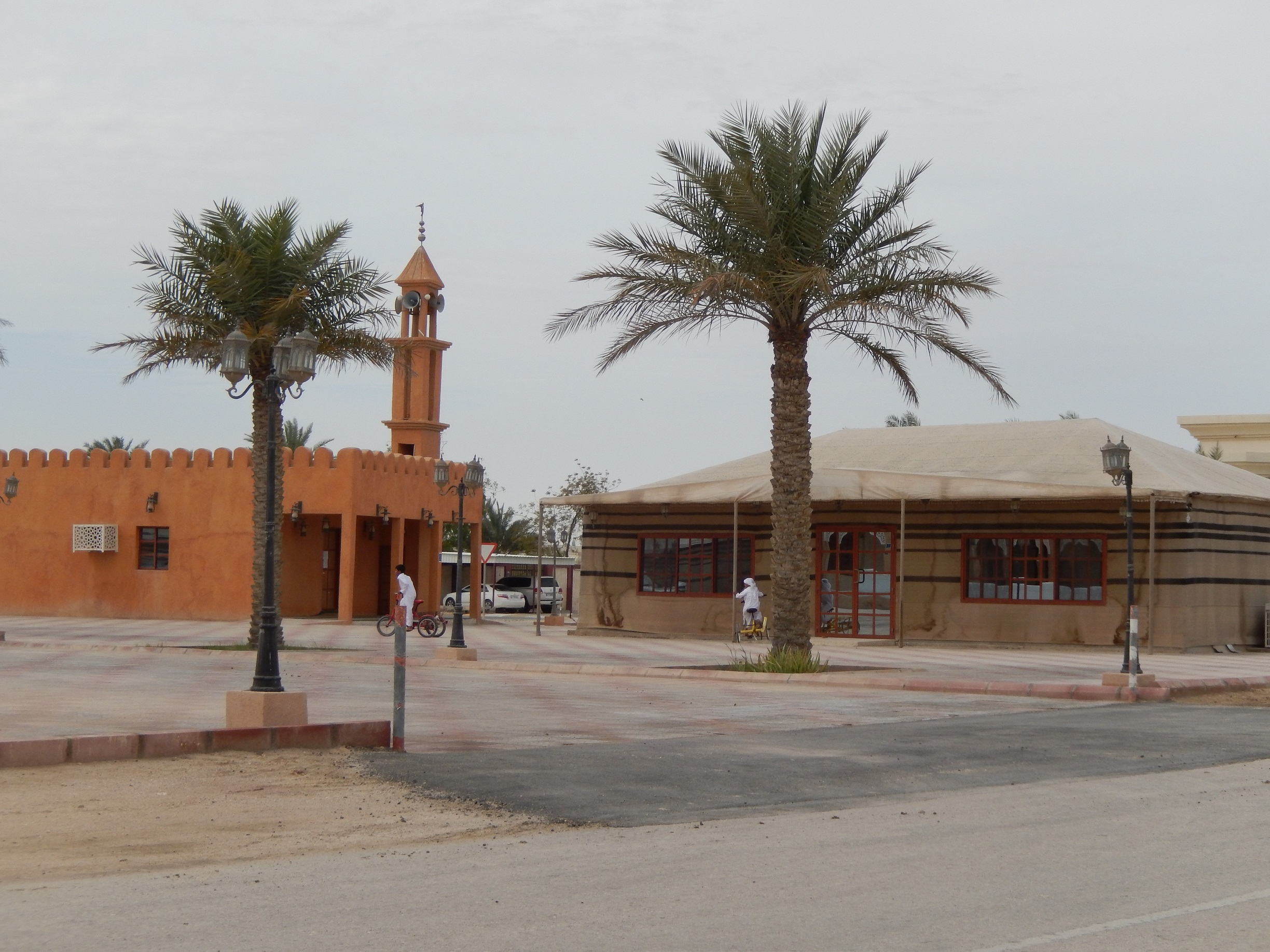
- Al Khurayb village center

- Location in Qatar
- Coordinates: 25°26′0″N 51°13′12″E
- Country: Qatar
- Municipality: Al-Shahaniya
- Zone: Zone 80
- District no.: 449

Area
  - Total: 4.5 sq mi (12 km^{2})
- Elevation: 128 ft (39 m)

Al Khurayb (Arabic: الخريب; also spelled Lekhraib and Al Khuraib) is a village in Qatar located in the municipality of Al-Shahaniya. The closest major city is the municipal seat, Al-Shahaniya City. Historically, the village has been inhabited primarily by members of the Dawasir tribe.

== Etymology ==
According to the Ministry of Municipality and Environment, Khurayb is derived from the Arabic word kharab, which translates to "damage". The name was given to the area because, during the wet season, fast-flowing water would engulf the region, causing harm to the local vegetation.

== History ==
J.G. Lorimer makes mention of Al Khurayb in his 1908 handbook, the Gazetteer of the Persian Gulf. He listed its location as 19 miles south-west of Khor Shaqiq and 16 miles east from the east coast. Remarking on the nature of the settlement, he describes at as a Bedouin camping ground where good water is obtainable at 15 fathoms from a masonry well.

In the mid-1980s, the first commercially distributed water brand in Qatar, Doha Water, was bottled in Al Khurayb.

== Geography ==
Al Khurayb is close to the municipal seat of Al-Shahaniya City, 7 km to the south. It is situated 40 km away from the capital Doha.

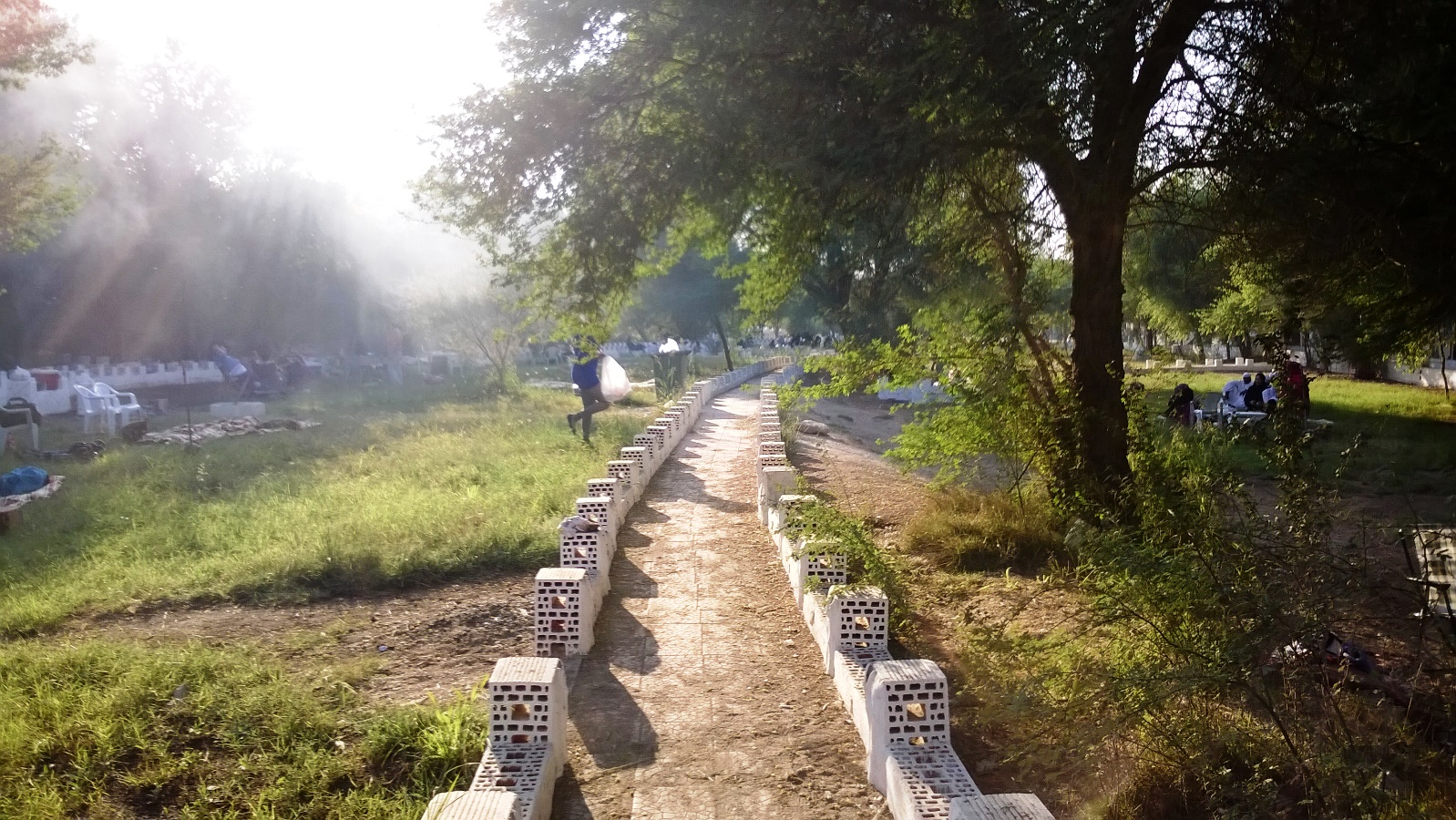
Al Dossari Zoo & Game Reserve

After oil was first struck on the western Dukhan anticline in 1939, two deep wells were bored close to Al Khurayb in 1953, so as to examine the oil-producing capability at the peak of the Qatar anticline, which Al Khurayb and the majority of Qatar lies on. The outcomes were less than desirable, prompting prospectors to continue their investigations further north.

The Al Dossari Zoo & Game Reserve, a private park founded in 1980, is based in Al Khurayb. More than 300 animals can be found in the park which spans at least 100,000 square meters. It is a popular destination for families. Facilities include residential buildings and a heritage center. The Qatar Tourism Authority has been active in developing the site as a tourist destination.

== Infrastructure ==
Basic utilities such as water and electricity are sub-par. Waste removal is also a problem in the village, as debris often obstructs its streets. Few shops are located nearby.

The village hosts the largest sheep complex in Qatar, and in recent years the government established a feed storage warehouse. There is not yet a veterinary clinic in the complex.
