= Lehsiniya =

Lehsiniya لحصين
- Village
- Location in Qatar
- Coordinates: 25.33984°N 51.29582°E
- Country: Qatar
- Municipality: Al-Shahaniya
- District no.: 453

Area
  - Total: 1.9 sq mi (5.0 km^{2})

Lehsiniya (Arabic: لحصين; also spelled Al Hassaniya) is a village in Qatar located in the municipality of Al-Shahaniya. It lies close to the eastern border with Al Rayyan Municipality.

== Etymology ==
The name Lehsiniya originates from the Arabic word hassan, which translates to "beautiful". It earned this name because of the abundant vegetation found in the area.

== Geography ==
Lehsiniya is located in central Qatar. It forms the northernmost boundary of the southern sector of the central belt region. To the south and west of this area, there is a notable change in the landscape, gradually increasing in elevation.

== Infrastructure ==
To the south of the village is a shooting range for the Qatar Amiri Guard. A large farm is also maintained in the area.
