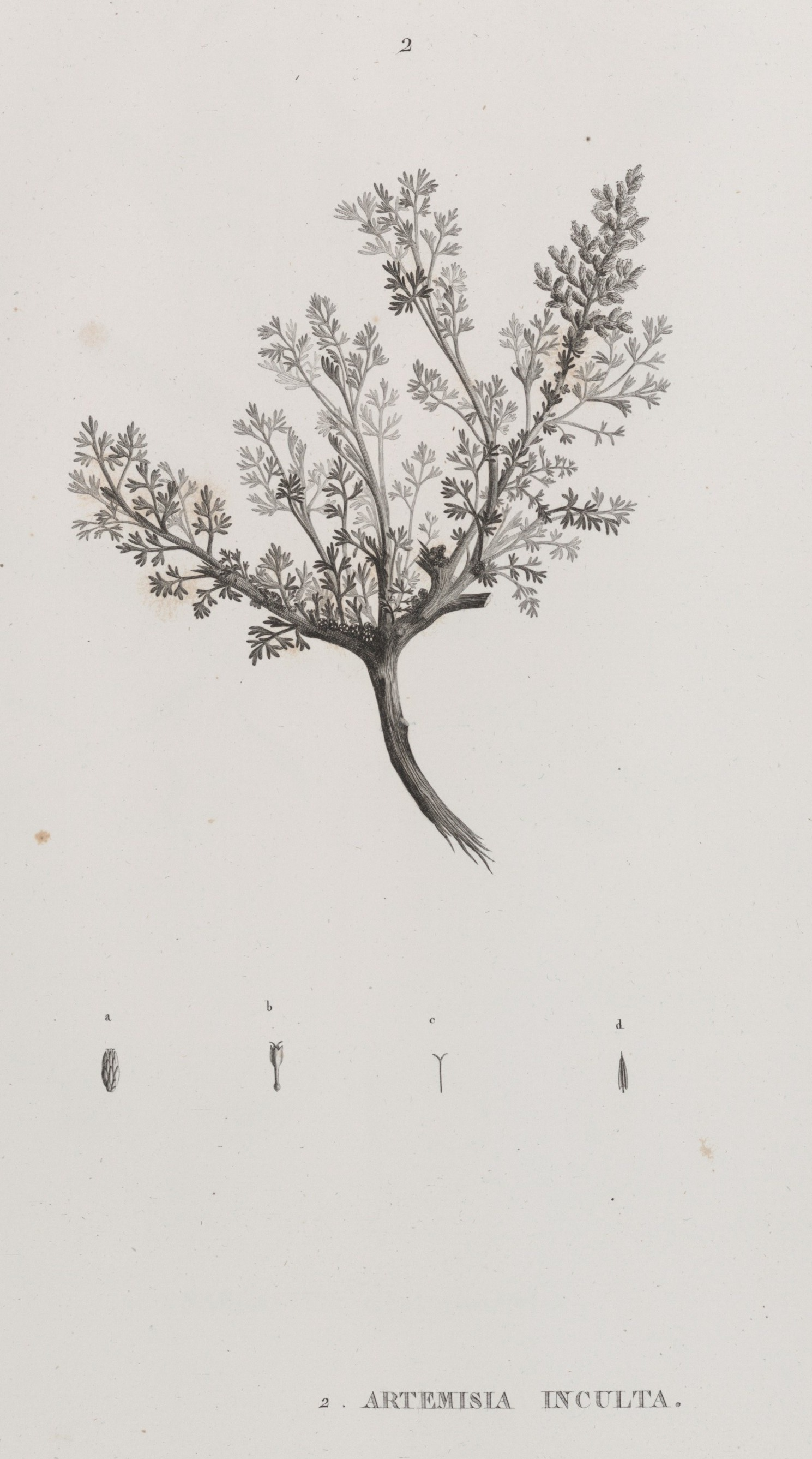
- Botanical illustration of Artemisia inculta

Scientific classification
- Kingdom: Plantae
- Clade: Embryophytes
- Clade: Tracheophytes
- Clade: Angiosperms
- Clade: Eudicots
- Clade: Asterids
- Order: Asterales
- Family: Asteraceae
- Genus: Artemisia
- Species: A. inculta

Binomial name
- Artemisia inculta Delile

= Artemisia inculta =

Species of plant

Artemisia inculta is a rare perennial species of aromatic undershrub in the family Asteraceae, native to North Africa and select regions of the Middle East.

== Description ==
Artemisia inculta is a suffrutescent perennial herb distinguished by its woody lower stems and finely divided, pinnatisect foliage. It reaches heights of approximately 60 cm. The inflorescences consist of small, tightly clustered capitula, typically forming at terminal or upper axillary positions.

== Habitat ==
In Qatar, Artemisia inculta favors marginal environments, especially roadside habitats. Its presence is rare and often restricted to areas with shallow soil depressions where some moisture and protection from disturbance may persist.

== Distribution ==
Originally described by Delile in 1814 after being found in Egypt, the species is primarily known in North Africa and the Middle East, with limited confirmed observations in the Arab states of the Persian Gulf. It has also been reported on the Greek island of Crete.

== Local use and significance ==
Artemisia inculta, known in parts of the Middle East as sheeh, holds medicinal significance across the Middle East. Traditionally, its leaves have been employed as antiseptics and insect repellents, and the plant is valued for its purported antimicrobial properties. Ethnobotanical accounts list uses ranging from treatments for gastrointestinal ailments to remedies for bronchial conditions and neurological complaints.
