= Sheikh Faisal Bin Qassim Al Thani Museum =

Museum located in Qatar

Coordinates: 25.349204°N 51.259114°E

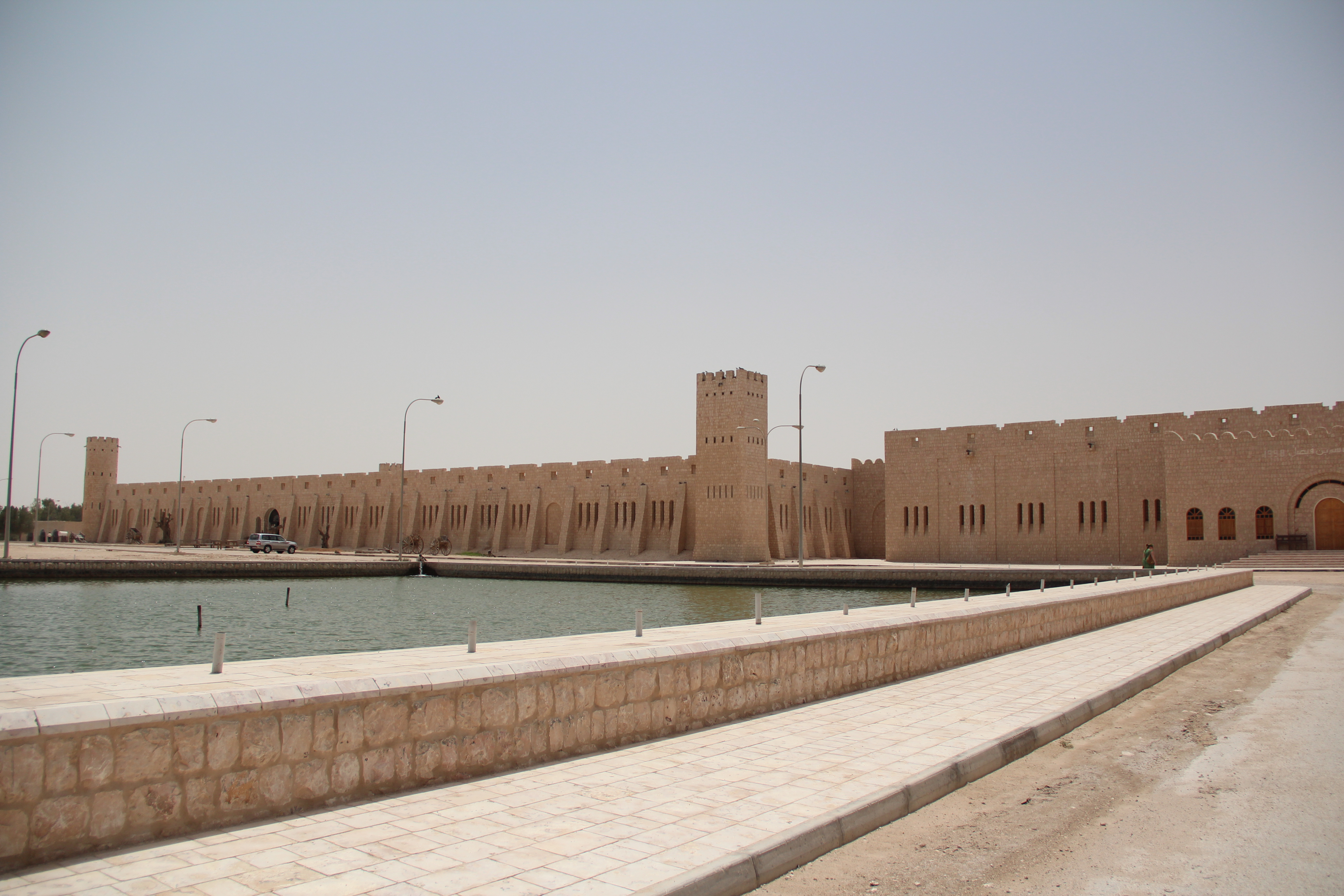
Entrance to the museum.

Sheikh Faisal Bin Qassim Al Thani Museum is a privately owned museum located in the municipality of Al-Shahaniya in Qatar. Encompassing an area of 530,000 m^{2}, the three-building museum was opened in 1998 by Sheikh Faisal bin Qassim Al Thani.

== Location ==
The museum is located in Al Samriya, a locality of Al-Shahaniya that is approximately 20 km westward of the capital Doha. It is accessible through Dukhan Road.

== History ==
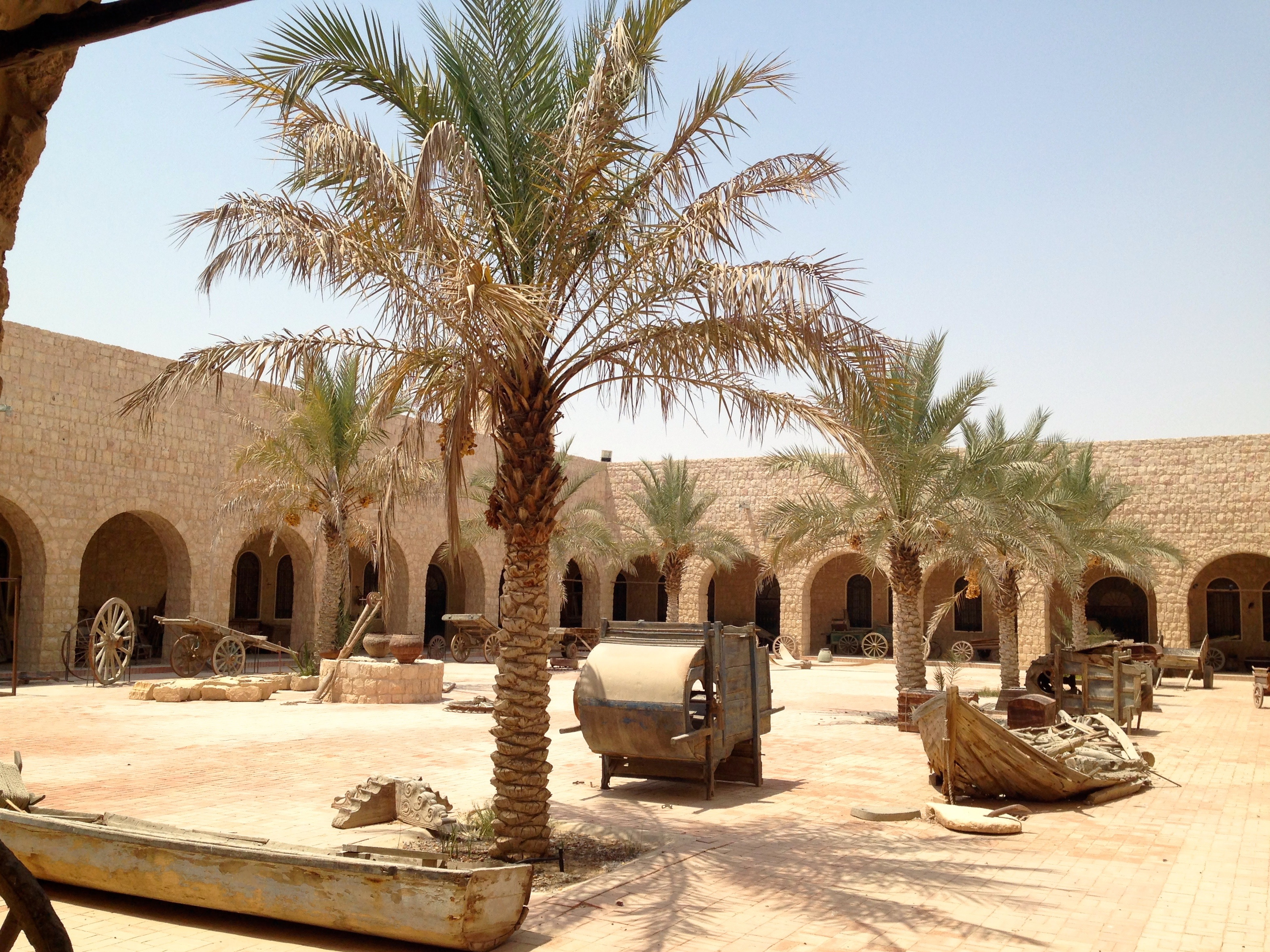
Museum courtyard.

In 1998, Sheikh Faisal bin Qassim Al Thani opened the museum to the public. The museum, consisting of three buildings, was built over a historic fort in Al Samriya. Sheikh Faisal has stated that his intent was to preserve and promote the cultural heritage of Qatar by housing traditional artifacts and artworks within the museum.

From 2017 to 2021, Kees Wieringa was the director of the museum, before being followed by Claudio Cravero.

== Collections ==
There are 15 halls in the museum which accommodate a total of over 30,000 artifacts. All of the artifacts in the museum were collected by Sheikh Faisal over a span of 50 years and includes pieces from the Jurassic period, as well as items from the 2022 World Cup in Qatar. The artifacts are grouped into four main categories: Islamic art, vehicles, coins and currency, and traditional Qatari artifacts. Objects of each category are housed in separate rooms with distinct themes. Among the museum's permanent displays is a traditional Syrian house from Damascus reconstructed inside the museum.

=== Islamic art ===
There are eight designated halls displaying Islamic artworks. Included in this category is a hall for Islamic textiles, a hall for Islamic manuscripts, a hall for Islamic paintings and a hall showcasing verses of the Qur'an.

=== Vehicles ===
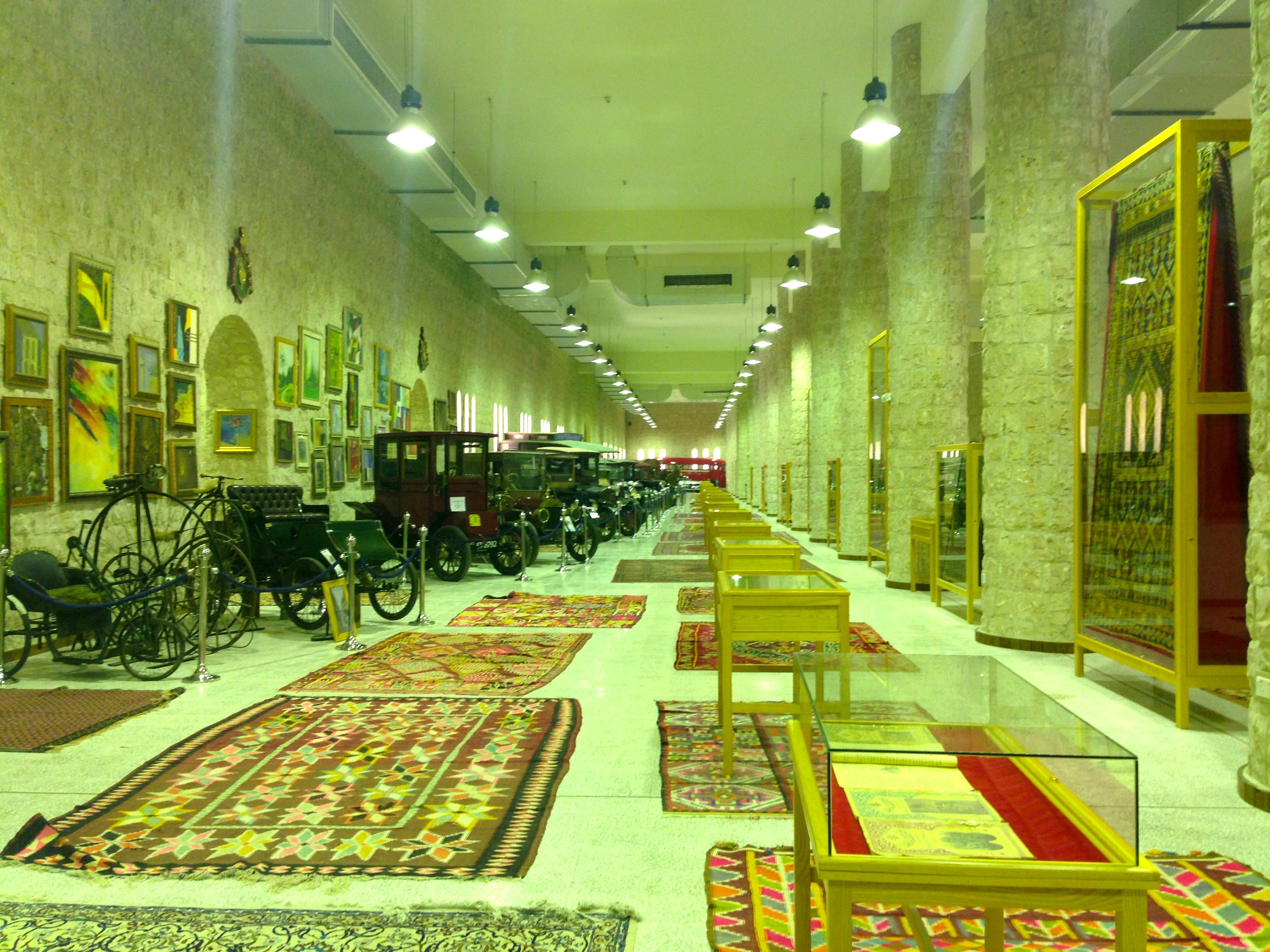
A collection of automobiles and artifacts in the museum.

Several types of vehicles from varying periods are displayed in a number of halls. Automobiles dating from 1885 onward are displayed, as well as former automobiles used by government officials. Furthermore, a number of different motorcycles and bicycles are showcased.

==== Car museum ====
An additional car museum was opened in 2022 containing 300 classic, sport, and vintage vehicles ranging from the early 1900s to the modern times, displaying the evolution of cars over their 120 years of history.

==== Vintage Sports Car exhibition ====
In 2023 the museum collaborated with the City Center Doha Mall and showcased 11 cars from the collection.

=== Coins and currency ===
The coins and currency halls put on display ancient currencies, silver and gold coins used during and before the emergence of Islam in the Middle East, and contemporary currencies of many countries. As of 2022, the collection was made up of about 4,000 items.

=== Qatari heritage ===
Traditional Qatari artifacts in the museum vary widely in theme, ranging from pearling equipment, dhows, and Bedouin handicraft.

=== Azerbaijani exhibition ===
The "Azerbaijan: Crafting a Cultural Network along the Silk Road" exhibition consists of a display of items representing Azerbaijan's local heritage, including traditional carpets, dresses, musical instruments, bowls and Arab mashrabiya, hoping to give visitors a chance to learn more about Azerbaijan's history.

=== Georgian exhibition ===
Made to show of the history of Georgia, the exhibition displays various rugs, coins and artifacts, as well as the Mandili, a traditional headscarf. Georgian cotton and silk textile inspired stained glass paintings reflecting the 18th, 19th and 20th century are also available for visitors to see alongside a specially for the exhibit made replica of the King's Clothes.

=== The Majlis - Cultures in Dialogue ===
This touring exhibit, which was part of a larger project, was intended to connect people, beliefs and cultures through the availability of dialogues that are respectful yet incisive and included approximately 50 objects. It began its 2-year European tour in September 2018 with its first stop in Valletta, Malta. The exhibit then moved to the Unesco Headquarters in Paris from November until December. Then it went on to the Institut du Monde Arabe also in Paris and to the Weltmuseum in Austria. In January 2021, the exhibit opened at its fifth location, the National Archaeological Museum in Madrid, followed by the sixth and final stop at the Palace of Charles V in Granada, Spain.

=== Leaning mosque and minaret ===
The Minaret and Mosque are leaning to the right and are made out of locally sourced stones. They took two years to complete and were designed by Sheikh Faisal bin Qassim Al Thani. Being opened to the public in spring of 2023, both the minaret and mosque are meant to reflect the importance to preserve Qatar's heritage. Ensuring the safety of the structures are 30 sensors monitoring the buildings to discover potential safety concerns in advance.

== Events and temporary exhibitions ==
=== The ‘Collectibles’ exhibition ===
The exhibition was a cooperation between the FBQ museum, the Arab Postage Stamps Museum and the Qatar National Library (QNL). The QNL hosted the exhibition in its Heritage Collection area, and is made up of various books and tools pertaining to horses and equestrians as well as historical documents from the first pedigree horse of highest degree ever registered in Qatar.

=== QatarIndia Cultural Exhibition ===
As part of the Qatar India 2019 Year of Culture, the QatarIndia Cultural Exhibition was opened to display the history between the two countries and their similarities, as well as the diverse Indian culture by focusing on trade, arts, incense, foods and the Indian community. The exhibition opened in April 2019 and remained opened until July that year.

=== 'Artists in Qatar' exhibition ===
In 2020 the FBQ Museum hosted the fifth BigBMeetUp, a Qatari outreach initiative founded in 2018, in the white Majilis. The event consisted of a panel discussion held by the artist Othman Kunji and a six-week long exhibition with artworks by Qatari artists.

=== 'Artists in the time of COVID-19' exhibitions ===
In September 2020, the first of three 'Artists in the time of COVID-19' exhibition was opened after the FBQ Museum reached out to local artists to create and submit artworks. The exhibition was made up of sixty varying artworks from more than 30 Qatar-based artists displaying how they coped during the pandemic. The second exhibition was opened in October and the third in November.

=== Qatari Businesswomen Association celebration ===
On the occasion of Qatar's National Day 2021, the Qatari Businesswomen Association (QBWA) held a celebration under the name of 'The Ancestors' Land...is a Trust' at the FBQ Museum. The event featured a speech by the vice president of the QBWA, a tour of the museum as well as discussions between the participants.

=== World Cup 2022 ===
In preparation for the World Cup, the museum added an additional children's museum, various activities, halls and a theatre that held 500 people for events and lectures.

== See also ==
- Collecting practices of the Al-Thani Family
- List of museums in Qatar

== Bibliography ==
- Mohammed Hassan Al-Kuwari; Maryam Khulaifi; Jamila Abdulla Ahmed; Sawsan Al-Haddad (2013). دليـل المؤسسات الثقافية في قطر [Directory of Cultural Institutions in Qatar] (PDF). Ministry of Culture, Arts and Heritage (in Arabic). Archived from the original (PDF) on 2015-12-22.
