= Municipalities of Qatar =

Municipalities of Qatar بلديات قطر (Arabic)
- Category: Unitary state
- Location: Qatar
- Number: 8
- Populations: 8,794 (Al Shamal) – 956,457 (Doha)
- Areas: 203 km^{2} (78.3 sq mi) (Doha) – 3,309 km^{2} (1,277.6 sq mi) (Al-Shahaniya)
- Government: Municipal government, National government
- Subdivisions: Zones

Since 2015, Qatar has been divided into eight municipalities. In 2004, a new municipality, Al Daayen, was created under Resolution No. 13, formed from parts of Umm Salal and Al Khawr; at the same time, Al Ghuwariyah was merged with Al Khawr; Al Jumaliyah was merged with Ar Rayyan; Jarayan al Batnah was split between Al Rayyan and Al Wakrah; and Mesaieed was merged with Al Wakrah. In 2014, the western city of Al-Shahaniya split off from Al Rayyan Municipality to form its own municipality.

For statistical purposes, the municipalities are further subdivided into 98 zones (as of 2015), which are in turn subdivided into districts and blocks, the latter being the lowest subdivision.

== History ==
According to Ministry of Municipality and Urban Planning, in 1963, the first municipality was the Municipality of Qatar, created under Law No. 11. Later in the same year, its name was changed to Municipality of Doha by Law No. 15. Then, on 17 July 1972, Ar Rayyan, Al Wakrah, Al Khawr and Dhekra, Ash Shamal, and Umm Salal municipalities created under Resolution No.11. In 1997, Umm Sa'id municipality formed from parts of Al Wakrah (former HASC code QA.WA, FIPS code QA05) and Jariyan al Batnah (QA.JB, QA07).

In 2004, Al Daayen municipality created under Resolution No. 13. Judging from maps of the municipalities before and after this change, Al Daayen was formed from parts of Umm Salal and Al Khawr; at the same time, Al Ghuwariyah merged with Al Khawr; Al Jumaliyah merged with Ar Rayyan; and Jarayan al Batnah was split between Ar Rayyan and Al Wakrah.

In 2014, the western city of Al-Shahaniya was dissociated from Al Rayyan Municipality to form its own municipality. Integrating approximately 35% of Al Rayyan's area into the new municipality, some of Al Rayyan's western localities such as Al Gharbiam, Al Utouriya, Al Jemailiya, Umm Bab, Rawdat Rashed, Al Nasraniya, Dukhan and Al Khurayb were also included in the new municipality.

== Municipalities ==
Key	Map	Municipality (Baladiyah)	Capital	بلدية	Population (2015)	Area (km^{2})	Area (mi^{2})
1		Al Shamal	Madinat ash Shamal	الشمال	8,794	859.8	331.9
2		Al Khor	Al Khor City	الخور	202,031	1,613.3	622.8
3		Al-Shahaniya	Al-Shahaniya City	الشحانية	187,571	3,309.0	1,277.6
4		Umm Salal	Umm Salal Ali	أم صلال	90,835	318.4	122.9
5		Al Daayen	Umm Qarn	الضعاين	54,339	290.2	112.0
6		Doha (municipality)	Doha	الدوحة	956,457	202.7	78.3
7		Al Rayyan	Al Rayyan City	الريان	605,712	2,450	946.0
8		Al Wakrah	Al Wakrah	الوكرة	299,037	2,577.7	995.2
	-	Dawlat Qatar	-	دولة قطر	2,404,776	11,621.1	4,486.7

== Former municipalities ==
- Al Jemailiya (until 2004)
- Al Ghuwariyah (until 2004)
- Jariyan al Batnah (until 2004)
- Mesaieed (Umm Sa'id) (until 2006)

== See also ==
- ISO 3166-2:QA
- Qatar National Day
- List of cities in Qatar
