= 2021 Qatari general election =

- 2 October 2021
- 30 of the 45 seats in the Shura Council
- Turnout: ~63.5%
Party	Vote %	Seats
Independents	100	30
This lists parties that won seats. See the complete results below.
Speaker of the Shura Council before	Speaker of the Shura Council after
Ahmad bin Abdullah Al Mahmoud; Independent	Hassan bin Abdulla Al-Ghanim; Independent

Elections for the Shura Council (sometimes called the Consultative Assembly) were held in Qatar for the first time on 2 October 2021, allowing the public to vote for 30 out of the 45 seats, with the remaining 15 still appointed by the emir.

The Council has the authority to approve "general state policies and the budget", but "has no say in the setting of defence, security, economic and investment policy". The emir also maintained the final say upon any disagreement between himself and the Council.

Political parties are outlawed, and all candidates ran as independents. The election could not effect a change of government, which is appointed by the emir.

The elections, originally outlined in the 2003 constitution, had previously been scheduled for 2013, before being postponed in June of that year until at least 2016, at which point they were postponed again until at least 2019. Finally, in November 2020, Emir Tamim bin Hamad Al Thani pledged to hold the election in October 2021.

In a 2024 referendum, future elections were abolished and struck from the constitution, making this the only legislative election in Qatar's history.

== Background ==
=== Postponements and criticism of timing ===
In 2003, Qatar's new constitution first mandated that partial elections were to be held for the Shura Council, where 30 of its 45 members would be elected by the public, and 15 would remain appointed by the emir. Elections were first promised for 2005, but were delayed. In 2009, scholar Mehran Kamrava concluded that emir Hamad bin Khalifa's rhetoric on political liberalization was mostly meant to recruit support in the West, and predicted that "for the time being" chances that these elections would actually take place "seem minimal".

Elections were delayed several more times, until they were finally held in practice in 2021. Some observers, especially after the abolishment of further elections in 2024, noted that the timing of the election, after many delays, shortly before the 2022 FIFA World Cup, suggested that the election had more to do with Qatar wanting to improve its international image than with genuine political liberalization.

=== The authorities of the Shura Council ===
The Council has the authority to approve "general state policies and the budget", but "has no say in the setting of defence, security, economic and investment policy". The emir also retained veto powers over the body, and even if a two-thirds majority were to overrule said veto, the emir could "order the suspension of a given law for the period that he deems necessary to serve the higher interests of the country", giving him the final decision in any potential disagreement. The election could not effect a change of government, which is appointed by the emir.

Mohammed bin Abdulrahman Al Thani, at the time Qatar's deputy prime minister and foreign minister, called the election an "experiment", and clarified that the Council should not be expected to have the "full role of any parliament".

== Electoral system, eligibility and disenfranchisement ==
=== Electoral system ===
The vote was for 30 of the 45 seats in the Shura Council, with the remainder appointed by the Emir. The thirty members were elected from single-member constituencies by first-past-the-post voting.

=== Eligibility to vote and run as candidate ===
Voters had to be at least 18 years old, and candidates had to be at least thirty. Only citizens, who made up around 10% of Qatar's population at the time, were eligible to vote or run as candidates. However, naturalised citizens and citizens whose ancestors settled in Qatar after 1930 were barred from running or voting, unless they could prove that their grandfathers were born in the country, in which case they could vote based on "the place of residence of the tribe or family", or unless an Emiri Decree states them to have "Qatari origins".

=== Disenfranchisement, criticism, protest and repression ===
This led to criticism by international human rights organisations, who characterised it as "arbitrary voter disenfranchisement", as well as to protests led by members of one of the largest tribes in Qatar, Al Murrah, who were among those most affected by the discriminatory conditions. Several critics and protestors were detained by Qatari authorities, with Al Murrah members reporting that some were released only after "signing statements promising not to discuss their detention publicly and to remain off social media". Human rights organisations criticised this as repression of the right to free expression and freedom of assembly.

== Campaign ==
A total of 233 candidates contested the 30 seats, with 26 women running. Political parties remained banned and all candidates ran as independents.

== Results ==
No women were elected. Voter turnout was 63.5%.

Constituency	Elected member
1. Fereej Al Khulaifat	Abdulrahman Yousef Abdelrahman Al Khulaifi
2. Fereej Al Hitmi	Ahmed Hitmi Ahmed Al Hitmi
3. Fereej Al Salata	Abdullah Ali Jumaa Al Sulaiti
4. Al Mirqab	Issa Ahmed Issa Nasr Al Nasr
5. Old Al Ghanim	Hassan bin Abdulla Al-Ghanim
6. Mushayrib	Khalid Ghanim Nasser Al Ali Al Maadeed
7. Al Jasrah	Khalid Ahmed Nasser Ahmed Al Obaidan
8. Al Bidda	Nasser Salmin Khalid Al Suwaidi
9. Barahat Al Jufairi	Hamad Abdullah Abdulrahman Ali Al Mulla
10. Dawhah al Jadidah	Khalid Abbas Ali Kamal Al Emadi
11. Rawdat Al Khail	Nasser Mohsin Mohammed Bukshaisha
12. Al Rumeilah	Issa Arar Issa Ali Al Rumeihi
13. Fareej Al Najada	Mohammed Yousef Abdulrahman Al Manaa
14. South Al Wakrah	Mohammed Muftah Abdulrahman Al Muftah
15. North Al Wakrah	Yousef Ali Yousef Al Khater
16. Al Sailiya	Ali Futais Al Merri
17. Old Rayyan	Mohammed Bati Salem Khalifa Al Abdullah
18. Al Kharaitiyat	Ali Shbaib Nasser Al Attiyah
19. Al Daayen	Nasser Metref Essa Al Metref Al Humaidi
20. Al Khor Thakhira	Ahmad bin Hamad Al Muhannadi
21. Al Mashrab	Mohammed Eid Saad Al Hassan Al Kaabi
22. Al Ghariyah	Mubarak Mohammed Matar Al Matar Al Kuwari
23. Ar-Ruʼays	Yousef Ahmed Ali Al Sada
24. Abu Dhalouf	Mohammed Omar Ahmad Al Salem Al Mannai
25. Al Jumail	Nasser Hassan Al Nfeihi Al Kubaisi
26. Al Kuwariya	Nasser Mohammed Nasser Al Jufaili Al Nuaimi
27. Al Nasraniya and Al Khurayb	Sultan Hassan Mubarak Al Dabet Al Dosari
28. Dukhan	Mubarak Saif Hamdan Maasad Al Mansouri
29. Al Kharsaah, Ummahat Sawi and Al Owaina	Ali Saeed Rashed Al Khayareen
30. Rawdat Rashed	Salem Rashed Salem Rashed Al Muraikhi
Source: Doha News, Gulf Times

== Aftermath and abolition of future elections ==
In 2024, general elections were formally discontinued. On 15 October Emir Tamim bin Hamad Al Thani announced a constitutional referendum on proposals to abolish elections to the Shura Council and revert it to a fully appointed body. On 5 November the amendments were reportedly approved by 91% of voters, with a turnout of around 84%. As a result, the 2021 election stands as the only time in Qatari history that members of the Council were chosen by voters.
