= 2003 Qatari constitutional referendum =

- 29 April 2003

Results
Choice	Votes	%
Yes	68,987	96.98%
No	2,145	3.02%
Valid votes	71,132	99.62%
Invalid or blank votes	274	0.38%
Total votes	71,406	100.00%

A referendum to approve a new constitution was held in Qatar on 29 April 2003. The constitution was overwhelmingly approved, with over 98% in favour. The population of the country was estimated to be around 790,000 at the time of the referendum with only 85,000 registered voters (because the majority of the population are foreign workers). Voter turnout was 84.3%. With the referendum's approval, it also created a legislative body of which two-thirds would be elected by universal suffrage, and one third appointed by the Emir. According to the new constitution, the legislature will have three powers: to approve (but not prepare) the national budget; to monitor the performance of ministers through no-confidence votes; and to draft, discuss, and vote on proposed legislation, which becomes law only with the vote of a two-thirds majority and the Emir's endorsement.

== Results ==
Choice	Votes	%
For	68,987	96.98
Against	2,145	3.02
Total	71,132	100.00
Valid votes	71,132	99.62
Invalid/blank votes	274	0.38
Total votes	71,406	100.00
Source: Al Jazeera

== See also ==
- Constitution of Qatar
- 2024 Qatari constitutional referendum
