= 2024 in Qatar =

- Decades: 2000s; 2010s; 2020s; 2030s
- See also: Other events of 2024; History of Qatar

Events in the year 2024 in Qatar.

== Incumbents ==
- Emir of Qatar – Tamim bin Hamad Al Thani

== Events ==
=== January ===
- 2 January — The United States reaches a deal with Qatar to extend the presence of US military in Al Udeid Air Base for another 10 years.

=== February ===
- 12 February – The Government of India announces that eight former Indian naval officers, previously sentenced to death in Qatar on espionage charges and later given prison terms, had been released by Qatari authorities.

=== March ===
- 28 March — Closing of the International Horticultural Expo 2023 Doha Qatar

=== August ===
- 2 August — The funeral of Ismail Haniyeh, the assassinated political leader of Hamas, is held in Lusail.
- 16 August — Abdullah bin Mohammed al-Khulaifi, the head of Qatar State Security, is awarded the George Tenet medal by the American Central Intelligence Agency for his role in strengthening intelligence cooperation with the United States and "maintaining national and regional security".

=== September ===
- 24 September — Qatar becomes the second Muslim-majority country after Brunei to be included in the Visa Waiver Program of the United States.

=== October ===
- 15 October — Emir Tamim bin Hamad Al Thani announces plans for a referendum on whether to abolish direct elections to the Consultative Assembly of Qatar.

=== November ===
- 5 November — The 2024 Qatari constitutional referendum passes with 90.6% of voters in favour.
- 9 November — Qatar announces that it would temporarily withdraw as a mediator between Israel and Hamas until both parties show "their willingness and seriousness" to end the Gaza war.

=== Sports ===
- 12 January–10 February – 2023 AFC Asian Cup
- 2–18 February – 2024 World Aquatics Championships at Doha
  - 2–10 February – Artistic swimming at the 2024 World Aquatics Championships
  - 4–17 February – Water polo at the 2024 World Aquatics Championships
  - 11–18 February – Swimming at the 2024 World Aquatics Championships
- 2 March – Qatar 1812 km in Lusail
- 15 April–3 May – 2024 AFC U-23 Asian Cup
