= Al Salamiya =

Al Salamiya السلمية
- Village
- Location in Qatar
- Coordinates: 25.348189°N 50.956872°E
- Country: Qatar
- Municipality: Al-Shahaniya
- Zone: Zone 85
- District no.: 611

Area
  - Total: 2.3 sq mi (6.0 km^{2})

Al Salamiya (Arabic: السلمية, romanized: As Sulaymīyah) is a village in western Qatar located in the municipality of Al-Shahaniya.

It is located about 19 kilometres (12 mi) southeast of the industrial city of Dukhan, about 13 kilometres (8.1 mi) southwest of Al Nasraniya and about 9 kilometres (5.6 mi) north of Al Kharsaah.

== Etymology ==
A short tree known locally as Salam (Acacia ehrenbergiana) occurs frequently in the area, giving the village its name. The tree, which grows up to 3 metres (9.8 ft) tall and which has yellow-colored flowers, flourishes in the rawdas (depressions) of the area due to the sediment and water runoff.

== Geography ==
Al Salamiya is located in west-central Qatar. It forms the northernmost boundary of the southern sector of the central belt region. It is characterized by its high elevations relative to the surrounding area.
