= Umm Taqa =

Umm Taqa أُمّ طَاقَة
- District
- Location in Qatar
- Coordinates: 25°18′00″N 51°05′00″E
- Country: Qatar
- Municipality: Al-Shahaniya
- Zone: Zone 85
- District no.: 587

Area
  - Total: 3.6 sq mi (9.4 km^{2})

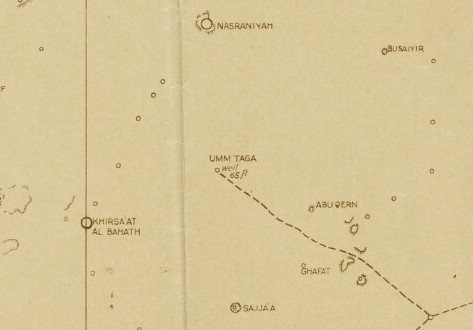
Sketch map depicting Umm Taga drawn in 1933.

Umm Taqa (Arabic: أُمّ طَاقَة, romanized: Umm Ţāqah) is a district in central Qatar located in the municipality of Al-Shahaniya. It is an important Palaeolithic site in the peninsula.

Nearby settlements include Al Kharsaah to the south-west and Al Nasraniya to the north.

== Etymology ==
In Arabic, umm translates to "mother", and is commonly used as a prefix for geographical features. The second constituent, taqa, is derived from the Arabic tawq, which translates to "encircle". It was given this name because it is flanked by hills on all sides.

== History ==
John Gordon Lorimer mentions Umm Taqa in his 1908 manuscript of the Gazetteer of the Persian Gulf, giving its location as "14 miles south of Dohat Fashshākh and 16 miles from the west coast". He also mentions "a masonry well, 25 fathoms deep, of good water" in the area.

== See also ==
- Archaeology of Qatar § Taqan culture
