= 2026 in Qatar =

- Decades: 2000s; 2010s; 2020s; 2030s
- See also: Other events of 2026; History of Qatar

Events in the year 2026 in Qatar.

== Incumbents ==
- Emir of Qatar – Tamim bin Hamad Al Thani
- Prime Minister of Qatar – Mohammed bin Abdulrahman bin Jassim Al Thani

== Events ==
=== February ===
- 28 February – In retaliation for the 2026 Israeli–United States strikes on Iran, Iran launches missiles at surrounding countries, including Qatar.

=== March ===
- 2 March –
  - State energy firm QatarEnergy halts all LNG production at its Ras Laffan Industrial City following an Iranian drone attack.
  - The Qatar Emiri Air Force shot down two Iranian Su-24 jets over the Persian Gulf.
- 3 March – Ten people are arrested on suspicion of spying for Iran.
- 4 March – An Iranian ballistic missile strikes the Al Udeid Air Base, the largest US military base in the region.
- 5 March – Qatari authorities evacuate residents near the United States embassy in Doha as a precautionary measure.
- 6 March –
  - The Qatari government announces that its military had intercepted nine Iranian drones, while one drone struck an uninhabited area.
  - The Qatar Civil Aviation Authority partially reopens the country's airspace through designated contingency routes with limited capacity. Operations initially included evacuation flights for stranded passengers and air cargo services.
- 18 March – Iran launches a missile attack on Ras Laffan Industrial City, the world's largest LNG export facility, causing "extensive damage" according to QatarEnergy.
- 19 March – Qatar expels Iranian diplomatic staff handling military and security affairs due to Iranian attacks on the country.
- 22 March – After a technical malfunction, a helicopter of the Qatar Armed Forces crashes in regional waters, killing all seven people on board including three Turkish nationals.

=== April ===
- 7 April – Four people are injured by falling debris in Muraikh, after the Qatar Armed Forces intercept Iranian missiles.

=== June ===
- 21 June – An explosion at a gas plant in Ras Laffan kills at least 13 people and injures 66 others.
- 28 June – The Qatari interior ministry announces that a Qatari was ‌killed after sustaining wounds from shrapnel because of "military operations in the area" after a vessel carrying him and another individual went missing.

=== July ===
- 5 July —
  - Qatar announces that all maritime activities will renew immediately after a one-week halt.
  - Iranian state media reports that Iran and Qatar renewed maritime trade following an almost five-month halt.
- 9 July —
  - Qatar issues alert due to a security threat.
  - QatarEnergy suspends plans to restore production at the Ras Laffan processing plant due to an attack on an LNG carrier in the Strait of Hormuz.
- 24 July – The United States imposes a 12.5% tariff on Qatar, citing the presence of alleged forced labour in the supply chain.
- 27 July – Emir Tamim meets with senior rabbis in Islamic nations.

=== August ===
- 15 August — The Iranian military accuses the Qatar Armed Forces of capturing three Iranian Sukhoi Su-24 fighter jet pilots after their planes were shot down by Qatari air defences after an Iranian strike on Al Udeid Air Base in early March as part of the 2026 Iran war, adding that the pilots had been barred from meeting or communicating with Iranian officials or their families for six months. (Note: Qatar shot down two Iranian Su-24 bombers on 2 March 2026. One Iranian fighter jet pilot was killed in the strike.)
- 17 August — Israel halts all weapons exports to Qatar and all maintenance and supporting efforts connected to prior sales, calling it "an evil state" which works against the country and citing its hosting of Hamas leaders for years, as well as alleged attempts to influence Israeli public opinion, including paying Prime Minister Netanyahu's aides. (Note: Israel has no diplomatic relations with Qatar and has not sold any systems to it directly. However, Israel has supplied Qatar hundreds of millions of dollars' worth of technology which was part of bigger American-delivered systems, including air defense, night vision, and advanced avionics.)
- 20 August — The United States approves a $4.5 billion plan to sell refueling aircraft to Qatar.

=== September ===
- 15 September — Israeli and American authorities announce that the IDF chief Lt. Gen. Eyal Zamir met with Qatar Armed Forces Chief of Staff Lt. Gen. Jassim bin Mohammed bin Ahmed Al Mannai to discuss the Iranian regime despite bilateral tensions between the country.
- 29 September — Prime minister Sheikh Mohammed bin Abdulrahman Al Thani calls the October 7 attacks a "massacre" and demands that those responsible be held accountable.

=== October ===
- 13 October — Emir Tamim bin Hamad Al Thani reveals that the country's revenues fell 42% in the first half of the year as a result of Iranian attacks on some energy facilities in Ras Laffan Industrial City and the latter's blockade of Hormuz.
- 16 October – Qatar pledges to help fund the rehabilitation of the electrical sector and future reconstruction of southern Lebanon following the 2026 Lebanon war at no cost to the Lebanese state due to the Lebanese liquidity crisis.
- 21 October – Indonesia, Pakistan, Turkey, and Qatar sign the Badr defense agreement.
- 29 October – QatarEnergy announces a long-term liquefied natural gas procurement agreement with the United States until 2054.

=== November ===
- 13 November – A mutual defense agreement is signed by Turkey and Qatar.

=== Sports ===
- 19 November–13 December – 2026 FIFA U-17 World Cup
- 19–29 December – 2026 FIVB Volleyball Boys' U17 World Championship

== Deaths ==
- 27 May – Abdullah bin Hamad al-Attiyah, 73, deputy prime minister (2003–2011)
- 12 July — Hamad bin Khalifa Al Thani, 74, emir (1995–2013)
