= Al-Kharsaah Solar Power Plant =

Photovoltaic power plant in Al-Shahaniya, Qatar

- Official name: محطة الكهرباء الخرسعة
- Country: Qatar
- Location: Al Kharsaah, Al-Shahaniya Municipality
- Coordinates: 25°14′22.6″N 51°00′55.5″E
- Status: Operational
- Construction began: July 2020
- Commission date: October 2022

Solar farm
- Type: Standard PV

Power generation
- Nameplate capacity: 800 MW

The Al-Kharsaah Solar Power Plant (Arabic: محطة الكهرباء الخرسعة) is a photovoltaic power plant in Al-Shahaniya, Qatar. It is the first photovoltaic power plant in the country.

== History ==
The construction started in July 2020. The power plant was built in two phases, each with 400 MW generation capacity construction. The power plant was commissioned in 2022, making it the first photovoltaic power plant in Qatar.

== Design and layout ==
The power plant covers an area of 10 square kilometres (3.9 sq mi).

== Technical specifications ==
The power plant has a total installed generation capacity of 800 MW.

== See also ==
- List of power stations in Qatar
- Solar power in Qatar
