= Al-Khelaifi =

Al-Khelaifi or Al-Khulaifi (Arabic: الخليفي: "my successor"); is an Arabic language surname which in both of its Latin transcriptions (Khelaifi and Khulaifi) of the Perso-Arabic alphabet is also common among the Arab diaspora. Notable people with the surname include:

== Al-Khulaifi ==
- Mohamed Bin Mubarak Al-Khulaifi (born 1999), Qatari swimmer
- Noah Al-Khulaifi (born 1946), Qatari diplomat
- Sultan Khlaifa al-Khulaifi, Qatari blogger, human rights activist
- Yacob Al-Khulaifi (born 2001), Qatari swimmer

== Al-Khelaifi ==
- Aisha Al-Khelaifi, Qatari chess player
- Fatima Al-Khelaifi, Qatari researcher
- Kholoud Al-Khelaifi, Qatari chess player
- Nasser Al-Khelaifi (born 1973), Qatari businessman and sports executive
- Salama Al-Khelaifi, Qatari chess player
