= Demographics of Qatar =

Statistical data relating to the population of Qatar

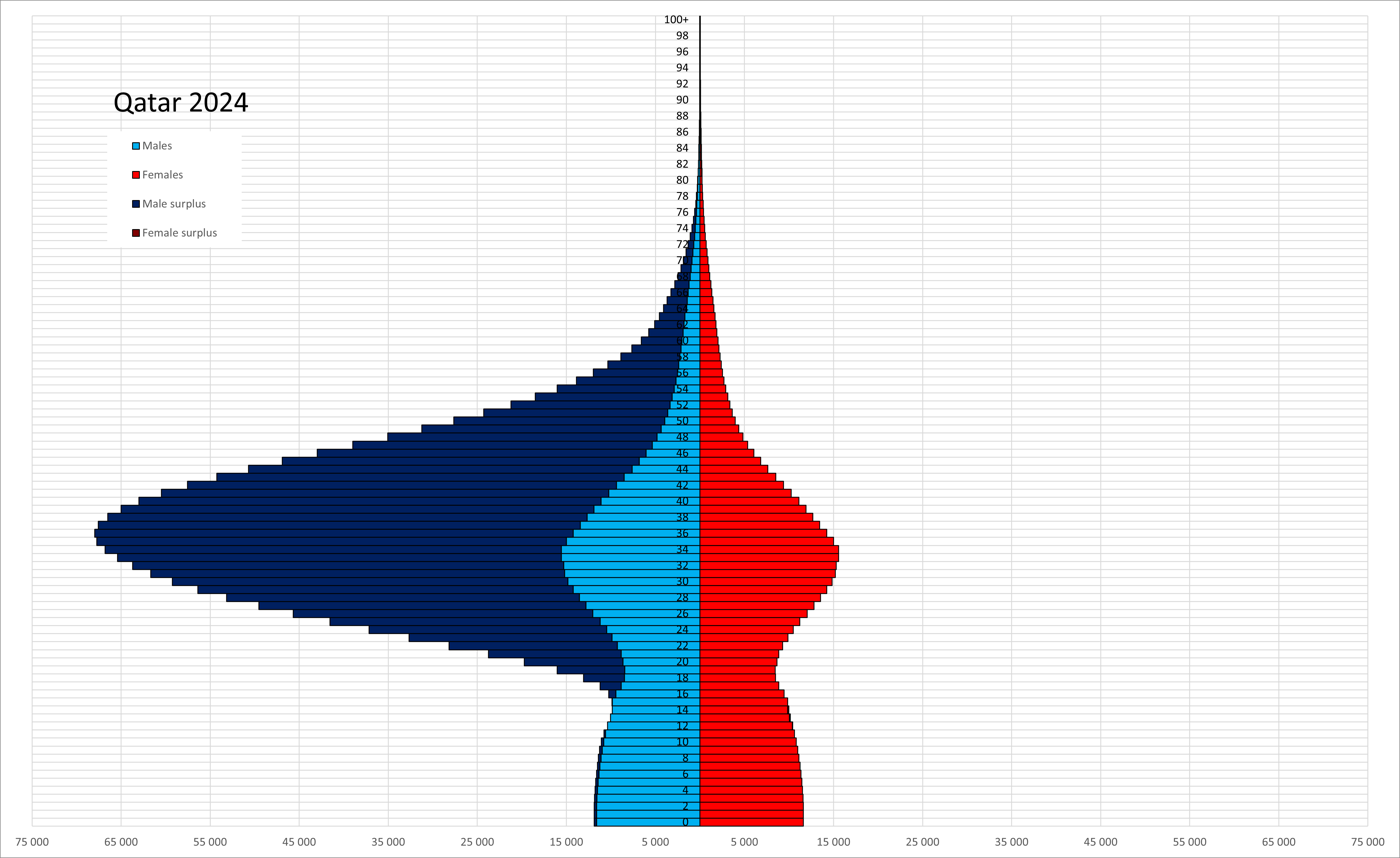
- Population pyramid of Qatar in 2024
- Population: 3,143,491 (2024 est.)
- Growth rate: 2.62% (2024 est.)
- Birth rate: 9.0 births/1,000 population (2023 est.)
- Death rate: 0.9 deaths/1,000 population (2023 est.)
- Life expectancy: 79.81 years
  - male: 77.7 years
  - female: 81.96 years (2022 est.)
- Fertility rate: 1.47 children born/woman (2024), 1.41 for non-Qataris, 2.23 for Qataris
- Infant mortality: 6.62 deaths/1,000 live births
- Net migration rate: 2.45 migrant(s)/1,000 population (2022 est.)
- Immigrant share: 76.7% (2024)

Age structure
- 0–14 years: 14.23%
- 15–64 years: 84.61%
- 65 and over: 1.16%

Sex ratio
- Total: 3.36 male(s)/female (2022 est.)
- At birth: 1.02 male(s)/female
- Under 15: 1.02 male(s)/female
- 65 and over: 1.13 male(s)/female

Nationality
- Nationality: Qatari

Language
- Official: Arabic

Natives of the Arabian Peninsula, many Qataris (Arabic: قطريون) are descended from a number of migratory Arab tribes that came to Qatar in the 18th century from mainly the neighboring areas of Nejd and Al-Hasa. Some are descended from Omani tribes. Qatar has about 2.6 million inhabitants as of early 2017, the vast majority of whom (about 92%) live in Doha, the capital. Foreign workers amount to around 88% of the population, the largest of which comprise South Asians, with those from India alone estimated to be around 700,000. Egyptians and Filipinos are the largest non-South Asian migrant group in Qatar. The treatment of these foreign workers has been heavily criticized as conditions of these workers are that of modern slavery. However the International Labour Organization published report in November 2022 that contained multiple reforms by Qatar for its migrant workers. The reforms included the establishment of the minimum wage, wage protection regulations, improved access for workers to justice, etc. It included data from last 4 years of progress in workers conditions of Qatar. The report also revealed that the freedom to change jobs was initiated, implementation of Occupational safety and health & labor inspection, and also the required effort from the nation's side.

Islam is the official religion, and Islamic jurisprudence is the basis of Qatar's legal system. A significant minority religion is Hinduism due to the large number of Qatar's migrant workers coming from India.

Arabic is the official language and English is the lingua franca of business. Hindi-Urdu and Malayalam are among the most widely spoken languages by the foreign workers. Education in Qatar is compulsory and free for all citizens 6–16 years old. The country has an increasingly high literacy rate.

== Population ==
1986–2024
Year	Pop.	±% p.a.
1986	369,079	—
1997	522,023	+3.20%
2004	744,029	+5.19%
2010	1,699,435	+14.76%
2015	2,404,776	+7.19%
2020	2,846,118	+3.43%
2024	3,143,491	+2.52%
Source: Qatar National Planning Council

1950–2020
Year	Pop.	±% p.a.
1950	24,283	—
1960	36,010	+4.02%
1970	116,350	+12.44%
1980	275,914	+9.02%
1990	440,176	+4.78%
2000	644,989	+3.89%
2010	1,709,230	+10.24%
2020	2,803,375	+5.07%
Source: United Nations

== Foreigners ==
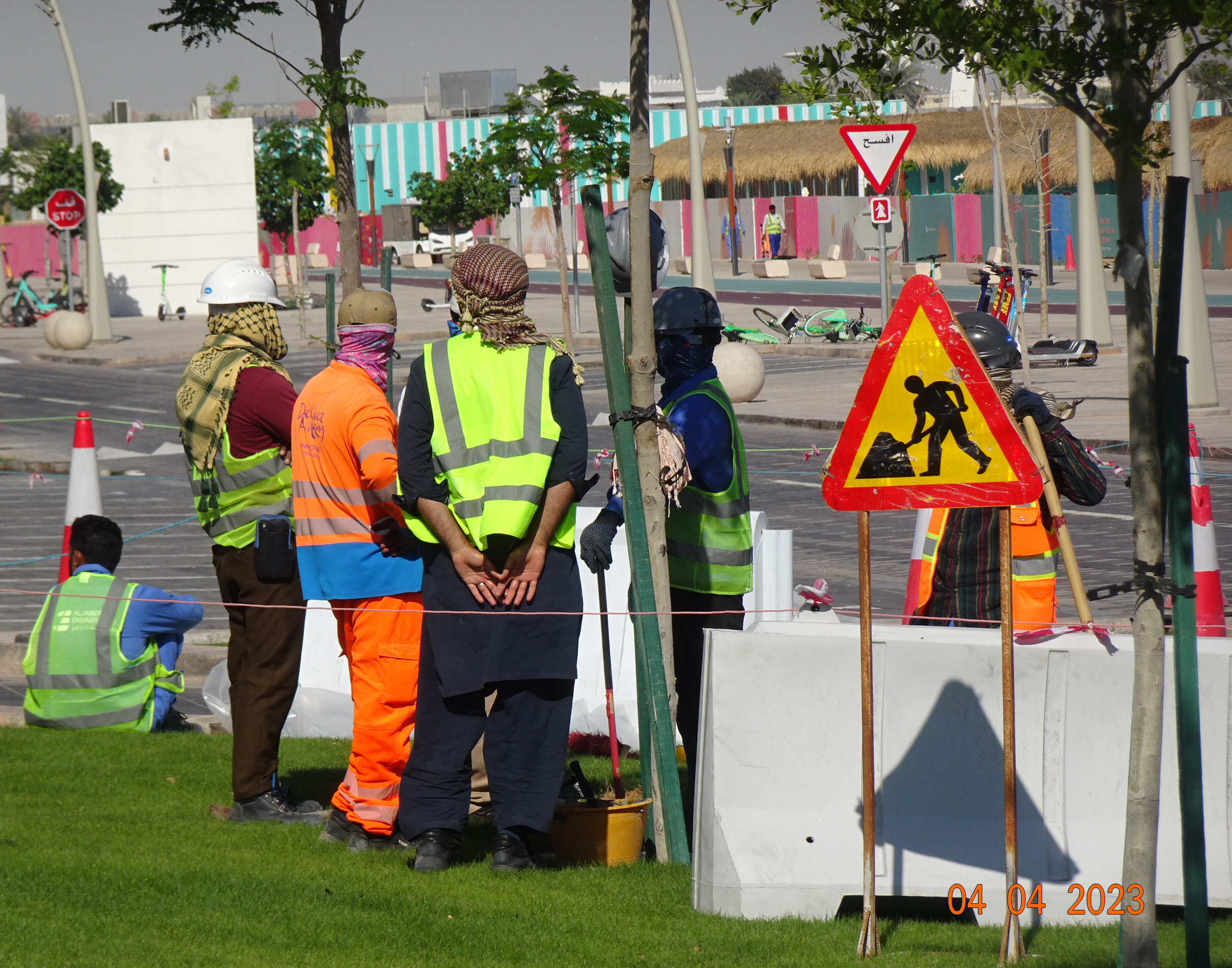
Construction laborers in Doha

Foreigners constitute 85% to 90% of Qatar's population of 2.7 million, with migrant workers making up approximately 95% of the workforce. South Asia and the Philippines are the primary regions which migrants come from. Societal divisions exist depending on the origin of the foreigner, with Europeans, North Americans, and Arabs typically securing better job opportunities and social privileges than sub-Saharan Africans and South Asians. Socialization between foreigners and Qataris faces limitations due to language barriers and different religious and cultural customs.

The human rights of migrant workers is limited by the country's Kafala system, which stipulates their requirement of a Qatari sponsor and regulates their entry and exit. Prospective migrant workers from origin countries sometimes face exorbitant recruitment fees, surpassing government-set limits, paid to licensed and unlicensed recruitment entities. These charges, ranging from $600 to $5,000, often force workers into debt and compel them to sell family assets. Government-to-government agreements have emerged in recent years to mitigate opaque recruitment practices and worker exploitation. Many companies in Qatar skirt local laws, resulting in workers facing delayed or non-payment of wages. While some employers deposit wages into bank accounts, most workers are paid in cash without detailed pay slips, hindering evidence of payment and complicating remittances. Additionally, the confiscation of passports by employers is a common practice in Qatar which limits the workers' freedom of movement and exposes them to potential exploitation.

=== By nationality ===
A 2011–2014 report by the International Organization for Migration recorded 176,748 Nepali Citizens living in Qatar as migrant workers. In 2012 about 7,000 Turkish nationals lived in Qatar and in 2016 about 1,000 Colombian nationals and descendants lived in Qatar. No official numbers are published of the foreign population broken down by nationality, however a firm provided estimates as of 2019:

Country	Number	percent
India	700,000	21.8%
Bangladesh	400,000	12.5%
Nepal	400,000	12.5%
Qatar	330,000	10.5%
Egypt	300,000	9.35%
Philippines	236,000	7.36%
Pakistan	180,000	4.7%
Sri Lanka	140,000	4.35%
Sudan	60,000	1.9%
Syria	54,000	1.8%
Jordan	51,000	1.6%
Lebanon	40,000	1.25%
United States	40,000	1.25%
Kenya	30,000	1%
Iran	30,000	1%

Updated from countries' embassies:

Nationality	Population	Percent of total	Data Recency
India	700,000	21.8%	May 2019
Bangladesh	400,000	12.5%	Apr 2019
Nepal	400,000	12.5%	Jul 2018
Qatar	333,000	10.5%	Q1 2019
Egypt	300,000	9.35%	May 2018
Philippines	236,000	7.35%	Jul 2019
Pakistan	150,000	4.7%	Jul 2019
Sri Lanka	140,000	4.35%	Sep 2018
Sudan	60,000	1.9%	Jan 2019
Syria	54,000	1.7%	Nov 2015
Jordan	51,000	1.6%	May 2017
Lebanon	40,000	1.25%	Jan 2019
United States	40,000	1.25%	Jul 2019
Kenya	30,000	1%	Mar 2019
Iran	30,000	1%	Dec 2013
Indonesia	27,350	0.85%	Apr 2019
Tunisia	26,000	0.8%	Nov 2018
Ethiopia	25,000	0.8%	Jan 2018
United Kingdom	22,000	0.7%	Apr 2018
Nigeria	11,000	0.35%	Sep 2018
China	>10,000	0.3%	Jan 2016
Turkey	10,000	0.3%	Jun 2018
Eritrea	10,000	0.3%	Aug 2016
Canada	9,200	0.3%	Mar 2019
Morocco	9,000	0.28%	Nov 2014
Saudi Arabia	8,245	0.25%	Aug 2017
Ghana	8,000	0.25%	May 2018
Palestine	8,000	0.25%	Apr 2019
South Africa	6,500	0.2%	Apr 2019
Iraq	6,100	0.2%	Nov 2018
France	5,500	0.17%	Sep 2018
Uganda	5,000 – 6,000	~0.17%	Apr 2019
Malaysia	5,000	0.15%	Jan 2019
Algeria	5,000	0.14%	Mar 2016
Spain	4,000	0.12%	Mar 2018
Afghanistan	3,500 – 4,000	~0.12%	Nov 2012
Australia	3,100	<0.10%	Jul 2019
Thailand	3,065	0.1%	Jul 2019
Ireland	3,000	0.1%	Jul 2019
Greece	2,600	<0.10%	Mar 2019
Romania	2,500	<0.10%	Jun 2019
Russia	2,500	<0.10%	Mar 2018
Bahrain	2,349	<0.10%	Aug 2017
Italy	2,100	<0.10%	Nov 2016
Serbia	2,000	<0.10%	Jul 2019
South Korea	2,000	<0.10%	Dec 2018
Germany	1,800	<0.10%	Mar 2019
Brazil	1,500	<0.10%	Dec 2018
Portugal	1,500	<0.10%	2018
Ukraine	1,500	<0.10%	2019
Vietnam	1,400	<0.10%	Apr 2019
Netherlands	1,350	<0.10%	Jul 2019
Albania	1,200	<0.10%	Jan 2017
UAE	1,027	<0.10%	Aug 2017
North Macedonia	1,000	<0.10%	Dec 2013
Poland	1,000	<0.10%	Sep 2019
New Zealand	989	<0.10%	Feb 2017
Japan	949	<0.10%	Oct 2017
Denmark	900	<0.10%	Feb 2017
Bosnia	750	<0.10%	Mar 2018
Belgium	700	<0.10%	Oct 2018
Mexico	550	<0.10%	Jul 2019
Sweden	550	<0.10%	Jul 2019
Croatia	500	<0.10%	Nov 2018
Cuba	~500	<0.10%	Jun 2019
Kyrgyzstan	500	<0.10%	May 2019
Austria	500	<0.10%	Nov 2016
Bulgaria	400	<0.10%	Apr 2019
El Salvador	400	<0.10%	Sep 2018
Hungary	400	<0.10%	Nov 2017
Singapore	400	<0.10%	Jul 2019
Azerbaijan	350	<0.10%	Feb 2019
Venezuela	337	<0.10%	Dec 2014
Argentina	320	<0.10%	Jul 2019
Czech Republic	300	<0.10%	Jul 2019
Gambia	300	<0.10%	May 2017
Finland	250	<0.10%	Oct 2018
Switzerland	238	<0.10%	2018
Senegal	200	<0.10%	Mar 2016
Georgia	200	<0.10%	Feb 2018
Belarus	200	<0.10%	Jan 2017
Kazakhstan	200	<0.10%	Aug 2015
Colombia	200	<0.10%	Feb 2017
Moldova	160	<0.10%	2018
Norway	160	<0.10%	2015
Panama	120	<0.10%	Jul 2019
Peru	100	<0.10%	Jul 2019
Slovakia	100	<0.10%	Aug 2019
Ecuador	100	<0.10%	Dec 2014
Benin	82	<0.10%	Dec 2014
Dominican Republic	75	<0.10%	Aug 2019
Brunei	41	<0.10%	Jul 2019
Liberia	40	<0.10%	Dec 2013
Zimbabwe	32	<0.10%	Jul 19
Uruguay	23	<0.10%	Jul 2019
Latvia	22	<0.10%	Jan 18

== Vital Statistics ==
=== UN estimates ===
Period	Live births per year	Deaths per year	Natural change per year	CBR*	CDR*	NC*	TFR*	IMR*
1950–1955	1,000	0	1,000	47.5	13.8	33.7	6.97	126
1955–1960	2,000	0	1,000	44.3	11.3	33.0	6.97	110
1960–1965	2,000	1,000	2,000	41.0	8.8	32.1	6.97	90
1965–1970	4,000	1,000	3,000	38.6	6.8	31.8	6.97	71
1970–1975	5,000	1,000	4,000	34.8	5.2	29.6	6.77	53
1975–1980	7,000	1,000	6,000	35.7	4.0	31.7	6.11	38
1980–1985	10,000	1,000	9,000	33.2	3.1	30.1	5.45	28
1985–1990	11,000	1,000	10,000	25.4	2.5	22.9	4.50	23
1990–1995	11,000	1,000	10,000	22.8	2.2	20.6	4.01	18
1995–2000	10,000	1,000	9,000	19.2	2.1	17.1	3.30	14
2000–2005	13,000	1,000	12,000	18.8	1.9	16.9	3.01	11
2005–2010	18,000	2,000	16,000	14.1	1.6	12.5	2.40	9
* CBR = crude birth rate (per 1000); CDR = crude death rate (per 1000); NC = natural change (per 1000); IMR = infant mortality rate per 1000 births; TFR = total fertility rate (number of children per woman)

=== Registered births and deaths ===
	Average population	Live births	Deaths	Natural change	Crude birth rate (per 1000)	Crude death rate (per 1000)	Natural change (per 1000)	Crude migration change (per 1000)	Total Fertility Rate
1970	108,000	3,616	464	3,152	33.4	4.3	29.1		
1971	118,000	3,921	491	3,430	33.2	4.2	29.0	60.83	
1972	129,000	4,038	563	3,475	31.2	4.4	26.8	63.77	
1973	141,000	4,367	660	3,707	31.0	4.7	26.3	64.29	
1974	152,000	4,562	688	3,874	30.0	4.5	25.5	50.54	
1975	163,000	4,559	600	3,959	28.0	3.7	24.3	46.32	
1976	172,000	4,893	609	4,284	28.4	3.5	24.9	28.93	
1977	181,000	5,313	686	4,627	29.4	3.8	25.6	25.42	
1978	190,000	5,977	645	5,332	31.4	3.4	28.0	20.27	
1979	203,000	6,057	709	5,348	29.8	3.5	26.3	40.27	
1980	222,000	6,750	662	6,088	30.5	3.0	27.5	63.61	
1981	246,000	7,192	725	6,467	29.3	3.0	26.3	79.00	
1982	275,000	8,032	789	7,243	29.2	2.9	26.3	88.44	
1983	307,000	8,261	803	7,458	26.9	2.6	24.3	89.24	
1984	338,000	8,613	642	7,971	25.5	1.9	23.6	75.01	
1985	368,000	9,225	794	8,431	25.1	2.2	22.9	63.81	
1986	373,395	9,942	784	9,158	25.2	2.0	23.2	-10.23	
1987	383,850	9,919	788	9,131	23.6	1.9	21.7	3.55	
1988	395,209	10,842	861	9,981	24.5	1.9	22.6	3.59	
1989	407,571	10,908	847	10,061	23.7	1.8	21.9	5.82	
1990	420,779	11,022	871	10,151	23.3	1.8	21.5	7.50	
1991	434,372	9,756	883	8,873	20.2	1.8	18.4	11.22	
1992	448,571	10,459	944	9,515	21.4	1.9	19.5	10.78	
1993	463,967	10,822	913	9,909	22.0	1.9	20.1	12.23	
1994	480,330	10,561	964	9,597	21.3	1.9	19.4	14.58	
1995	497,551	10,371	1,000	9,371	20.7	2.0	18.7	16.34	
1996	515,576	10,317	1,015	9,302	20.1	2.0	18.1	17.53	
1997	536,474	10,447	1,060	9,387	19.8	2.0	17.8	22.33	
1998	560,990	10,781	1,157	9,624	19.6	2.1	17.5	27.76	
1999	586,770	10,846	1,148	9,698	19.0	2.0	17.0	28.67	
2000	613,969	11,438	1,173	10,265	19.4	2.0	17.4		
2001	643,364	12,355	1,210	11,145	20.3	2.0	18.3	29.03	
2002	676,498	12,388	1,220	11,168	19.8	2.0	17.8	33.29	
2003	713,859	13,026	1,311	11,715	19.9	2.0	17.9	36.89	
2004	798,059	13,589	1,341	12,248	19.0	1.9	17.1	95.18	2.78
2005	906,123	13,514	1,545	11,969	16.5	1.9	14.6	112.78	2.62
2006	1,042,947	14,204	1,750	12,454	14.5	1.8	12.7	127.62	2.48
2007	1,218,250	15,695	1,776	13,919	13.3	1.5	11.8	142.74	2.45
2008	1,448,479	17,480	1,942	15,538	12.1	1.3	10.8	161.01	2.43
2009	1,638,626	18,351	2,008	16,343	11.2	1.2	10.0	112.60	2.28
2010	1,715 098	19,504	1,970	17,534	11.4	1.1	10.3	35.15	2.08
2011	1,732,717	20,623	1,949	18,674	12.0	1.1	10.9	-0.61	2.12
2012	1,832,903	21,423	2,031	19,392	11.7	1.1	10.6	45.32	2.05
2013	2,003,700	23,708	2,133	21,575	11.8	1.1	10.7	77.79	2.00
2014	2,216,180	25,443	2,366	23,077	11.5	1.1	10.4	89.61	2.00
2015	2,437,790	26,622	2,317	24,305	10.9	1.0	10.0	84.73	2.00
2016	2,617,634	26,816	2,347	24,469	10.2	0.9	9.3	61.41	1.85
2017	2,724,606	27,906	2,294	25,612	10.2	0.8	9.4	30.42	1.83
2018	2,760,170	28,069	2,385	25,684	10.2	0.9	9.3	3.56	1.75
2019	2,799,202	28,412	2,200	26,212	10.2	0.8	9.4	4.57	1.73
2020	2,833,679	29,014	2,811	26,203	10.2	1.0	9.2	2.91	1.67
2021	2,748,162	26,319	2,841	23,478	9.6	1.0	8.5	-39.10	1.60
2022	2,932,241	26,316	2,792	23,524	9.0	1.0	8.0	56.48	1.51
2023	3,063,005	27,322	2,714	24,608	8.9	0.9	8.0	35.36	1.46
2024	3,143,491	29,706	2,706	27,000	9.5	0.9	8.6	17.01	1.47
2025		32,169	3,044	29,125					

=== Population by sex and age group ===
(01.VII.2019):

Age group	Male	Female	Total	%
Total	2,064,276	734,926	2,799,202	100%
0–4	74,902	71,724	146,626	5.24%
5–9	71,614	69,267	140,881	5.03%
10–14	56,637	54,291	110,928	3.96%
15–19	47,897	38,313	86,210	3.08%
20–24	205,862	44,382	250,244	8.94%
25–29	352,616	92,515	445,131	15.90%
30–34	393,644	109,435	503,079	17.97%
35–39	319,713	89,034	408,747	14.60%
40–44	211,372	62,490	273,862	9.78%
45–49	145,216	39,577	184,793	6.60%
50–54	86,415	25,298	111,713	3.99%
55–59	51,306	16,530	67,836	2.42%
60–64	26,902	9,875	36,777	1.31%
65–69	10,744	5,365	16,109	0.58%
70–74	4,905	3,154	8,059	0.29%
75–79	2,703	2,031	4,734	0.17%
80+	1,828	1,645	3,473	0.12%
Age group	Male	Female	Total	Percent
0–14	203,153	195,282	398,435	14.23%
15–64	1,840,943	527,449	2,368,392	84.61%
65+	20,180	12,195	32,375	1.16%

=== Fertility ===
Years	1925	1926	1927	1928	1929	1930	1931	1932	1933	1934
Total Fertility Rate in Qatar	6.97	6.97	6.97	6.97	6.97	6.97	6.97	6.97	6.97	6.97

Years	1935	1936	1937	1938	1939	1940	1941	1942	1943	1944
Total Fertility Rate in Qatar	6.97	6.97	6.97	6.97	6.97	6.97	6.97	6.97	6.97	6.97

Years	1945	1946	1947	1948	1949
Total Fertility Rate in Qatar	6.97	6.97	6.97	6.97	6.97

=== Life expectancy ===
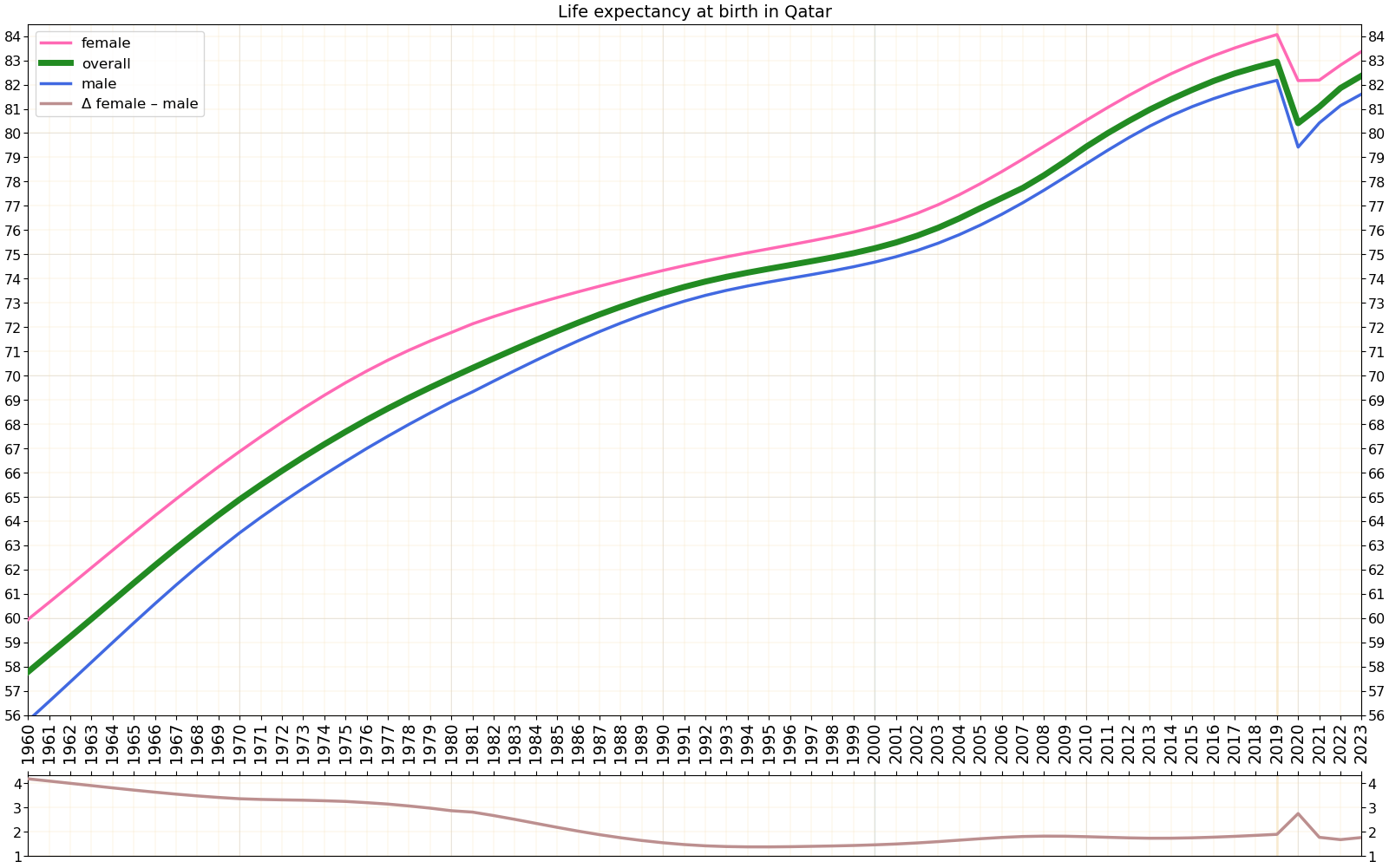
Life expectancy at birth in Qatar

Period	Life expectancy in Years	Period	Life expectancy in Years
1950–1955	55.2	1985–1990	74.5
1955–1960	59.2	1990–1995	75.3
1960–1965	62.9	1995–2000	76.0
1965–1970	66.6	2000–2005	76.6
1970–1975	69.7	2005–2010	76.9
1975–1980	71.8	2010–2015	77.6
1980–1985	73.4		
Source: UN World Population Prospects

== Qatari people ==
Native Qataris can be divided into three ethnic groups: Bedouin, hadar, and Afro-Arabs. Some hadar are of Bedouin descent, but most are descended from Iranian, Pakistani and Afghan migrants. They are sometimes called "Irani-Qataris". The Afro-Arabs, often referred to as abd (lit. 'slaves'), are mostly the descendants of enslaved people brought from east Africa. Qatari citizens comprise 11.6% of the country's population.

=== Citizenship ===
Two distinctions exist between Qatari citizens: those whose families migrated to Qatar before 1930, commonly referred to as "native" Qataris, and "naturalized", those whose families arrived after. Previously, the 1961 citizenship law defined Qatari citizens as only those families who have been in the country since the 1930s, though this was repealed in the 2005 citizenship law. In 2021, a law was signed by Emir Tamim bin Hamad Al Thani restricting the rights to vote in local elections to native citizens, leading to minor demonstrations and public disapproval. This led Al Thani to later announce that he would amend the law to allow all citizens to vote in future elections.

Children of Qatari mothers and foreign fathers are not granted Qatari citizenship; however, as of 2018, they are granted permanent residency status, which entitles them to similar state benefits as Qatari citizens. Nonetheless, the government limits the number of permanency residency visas it issues each year. The 2005 citizenship law allows for revocation of citizenship without appeal, which has been used on a number of families with dual citizenship.

=== Ethnic groups ===
Qatar's population has been historically diverse due to its role as a trading center, a refuge for nomadic tribes, and a hub for the pearling industry. Ethnic groups and the differences among them are considered sensitive topics in Qatari society and are rarely discussed in official contexts.

Bedouins, though constituting approximately 10 percent of the population, hold an outsized role in local culture. Many Qataris descend from tribes that migrated from Najd and Al-Hasa in the 18th century. Commonly called the bedu, they maintain ties, homes, and even passports in Saudi Arabia and other Gulf states. In the early 20th century, bedu migrated from the Arabian interior, with some traveling intermittently between Qatar and Bahrain. During the mid-20th century economic boom, many found work in the oil industry, police, army, and security services. The government settled Bedu families in the 1960s, discouraging the nomadic lifestyle. Today, many live in urban areas but return to the desert to stay connected to their roots. Many Bedu see themselves as noble and "pure" Arabs, often looking down on the settled population (hadar) as influenced by urban and Persian elements. Intermarriage between these groups is rare.

The hadar, a diverse group of settled Qatari citizens, includes Baharna, Huwala, Ajam (Iranians), and Arabs. Baharna Arabs, a group native to Qatar and often practicing Shia Muslims, sometimes face discrimination from the Sunni majority. Huwala Arabs, who are Sunni Muslims, migrated through the Persian Gulf to Persia and back to Qatar. Historically wealthier and better educated due to trade and pearling, their advantage has diminished as education became more accessible. The Ajam, ethnic Shia Persians, were active in boat building and still speak Persian. Qatar's Afro-Arab population descends from slaves brought from East Africa for the pearling industry. While some Arabs may view this group as "less" Qatari, most consider them full citizens. Despite occasional tensions, these groups are well integrated into Qatari society. Intermarriage is increasing, and Persian and African influences are evident in local culture.

=== Genetic studies ===
A 2023 study focusing on the Y-chromosome, which is passed down paternally, analyzed DNA samples from 379 unrelated Qatari men to investigate their genetic heritage and connections to other populations in the Arabian Peninsula, the Middle East, and Africa. This research utilized 23 Y-STR markers, highly variable segments of DNA, to create genetic profiles and assess diversity within the Qatari male population.

The study revealed a high level of genetic diversity within the Qatari male population, with the marker DYS458 showing the most variation. Analysis of these genetic markers allowed for the prediction of Y-chromosome haplogroups, which are branches on the human Y-chromosome phylogenetic tree. The most prevalent haplogroup found in the Qatari sample was J1, accounting for approximately 49% of the individuals tested. This haplogroup is known to be common in the Arabian Peninsula and is associated with populations of Semitic origin, particularly Arabic speakers. The prominence of J1 in Qatar, forming a "star-like expansion cluster" in genetic networks, suggests a significant ancestral component linked to the broader Arabian region and potentially a more recent population expansion. Other haplogroups found in notable frequencies included J2, R1a, E1b1b, E1b1a, T, and L.

To understand Qatar's genetic placement within the region, the study compared Qatari Y-STR data with that of 38 other Middle Eastern populations. This analysis revealed that Qataris are genetically closest to Iraqi Arabs, followed by Saudi Arabian populations. Conversely, they showed the greatest genetic distance from groups like Kurdish Iraqis, Turkish populations from Dogukoy, and Palestinian Christian Arabs. These relationships were visualized using multidimensional scaling (MDS) plots, which graphically represent genetic distances between populations. The MDS analysis placed Qatar within a cluster of populations from the upper Arabian Peninsula, including Iraq, Jordan, and Palestine, suggesting shared genetic affinities within this broad geographical area. Further analysis using phylogenetic trees and population structure analysis (STRUCTURE) corroborated these findings, consistently grouping Qatar with Iraqi Arabs and highlighting its distinctiveness from other Arabian Peninsula populations in some analyses, while also showing broader connections within the Middle East.

The study also investigated gene flow, or migration patterns, using Bayesian statistical methods. The analysis suggested that the primary migration route influencing the Qatari population was from Yemen to Kuwait, passing through Qatar. This finding aligns with a model of coastal migration within the Arabian Peninsula. While there was evidence of bidirectional migration between Qatar and neighboring countries like Saudi Arabia, Kuwait, Iraq, and the UAE, the strongest signal pointed towards this Yemen-Kuwait axis. This genetic evidence supports historical understandings of tribal movements and trade routes along the Persian Gulf coast.

== Religions ==
Religion in Qatar (ARDA 2020 est.)
1. Islam (65.5%)
2. Hinduism (15.2%)
3. Christianity (14.2%)
4. Others (6.06%)

Qatar is an Islamic state with multi-religious minorities like most of the Persian Gulf countries with waves of migration over the last 30 years. The official state religion is Sunni Islam. The community is made up of Sunni and Shi'a Muslims, Christians, Hindus, and small groups of Buddhists and Baha'is. Muslims form 65.5% of the Qatari population, followed by Christians at 15.4%, Hindus at 14.2%, Buddhists at 3.3% and the rest 1.9% of the population follow other religions or are unaffiliated. Qatar is also home to numerous other religions mostly from the Middle East and Asia.

== Languages ==
=== Arabic ===
Arabic is the official language of Qatar according to Article 1 of the Constitution. Arabic in Qatar not only serves as a symbol of national identity but is also the medium of official communication, legislation, and education. The government has instituted policies to reinforce the use of Arabic, including the Arabic Language Protection Law enacted in 2019, which mandates the use of Arabic in governmental and public functions and penalizes non-compliance. Arabic speakers constitute a minority of the 2.8 million population, at around 11%.

Qatari Arabic, a dialect of Gulf Arabic, is the primary dialect spoken. As the prestige dialect within the nation, Qatari Arabic not only functions in everyday communication but also plays a significant role in maintaining cultural identity and social cohesion among the Qatari people. The vocabulary of Qatari Arabic incorporates a plethora of loanwords from Aramaic, Persian, Turkish, and more recently, English. Phonetically, it conserves many classical Arabic features such as emphatic consonants and interdental sounds, which distinguish it from other Arabic dialects that have simplified these elements. Syntactically, Qatari Arabic exhibits structures that align with other Gulf dialects but with unique adaptations, such as specific verb forms and negation patterns.

In Qatari Arabic, like many Arabic dialects, there is a significant phonological distinction between long and short vowels. This distinction is crucial for both pronunciation and meaning. Long vowels in Qatari Arabic are generally held for approximately twice the duration of their short counterparts. This length distinction can affect the meaning of words, making vowel length phonemically significant. Qatari Arabic typically includes five long vowels: /aː/, /eː/, /iː/, /oː/, and /uː/. These long vowels are integral to maintaining the clarity and meaning of words. Short vowels in Qatari Arabic are /a/, /u/, and /i/. These vowels are shorter in duration and can be less emphasized in casual speech. In some dialectical variations, short vowels may even be dropped entirely in certain environments, a process known as vowel reduction. This feature is common in rapid, informal speech and can lead to significant variations in pronunciation from the standard forms of the language. The distinction between long and short vowels in Qatari Arabic not only affects pronunciation but also plays a role in the grammatical structure of words, influencing verb conjugations, noun cases, and the definiteness of nouns through the use of the definite article /al-/.

As English is considered the prestige lingua franca in Qatar, bilingual locals have incorporated elements of English into Qatari Arabic when communicating on an informal level. This mixture of English terms and phrases in Qatari Arabic speech is colloquially known as Qatarese. The practice of interchanging English and Arabic words is known as code-switching and is mostly seen in urban areas and among the younger generation.

As a result of mass migration, a South Asian pidgin form of Qatari Arabic has emerged in modern times.

=== English ===
English is the de facto second language of Qatar, and is very commonly used in business. Because of Qatar's varied ethnic landscape, English has been recognized as the most convenient medium for people of different backgrounds to communicate with each other. The history of English use in the country dates back to the mid-19th and early 20th centuries when the British Empire would frequently draft treaties and agreements with the emirates of the Persian Gulf. One such treaty was the 1916 protectorate treaty signed between Abdullah bin Jassim Al Thani and the British representative Percy Cox, under which Qatar would be placed under British administration in exchange for protection. Another agreement drafted in English came in 1932 and was signed between the Qatari government and the Anglo-Persian Oil Company. These agreements were mainly facilitated by foreign interpreters due to neither party possessing the required language skills for such complex arrangements. For instance, a translator and native Arabic speaker named A. A. Hilmy interpreted the 1932 agreement for Qatar.

=== French ===
Despite Qatar's population comprising only 1% French speakers, the country was admitted to the Organisation Internationale de la Francophonie as an associate member in 2012. It was not required to join as an observer state prior to its full admittance.

=== Other languages ===
Qatar's linguistic diversity is significantly shaped by its large expatriate population from South Asia and the Philippines. The most common Asian languages among migrants are Hindi, Urdu, Tagalog, Bengali, Tamil, Telugu and Malayalam. Hindi and Malayalam are particularly prevalent, with large communities of speakers from India. For example, Malayalam is spoken by a significant portion of the Indian community originating from the southern state of Kerala, who make up the majority of the country's Indian diaspora. Similarly, the widespread presence of languages such as Bengali, Tamil, and Urdu is attributed to a large portion of expatriates from Bangladesh, Pakistan, and other parts of India.

In 2015, there were more newspapers printed by the government in Malayalam than in Arabic or English.

During the COVID-19 pandemic in Qatar, the importance of these languages was particularly recognized in public health communications. The Qatari government utilized Asian languages extensively in its awareness campaigns to ensure that critical health information reached all population segments, including those who might not speak Arabic or English proficiently. This multilingual approach involved disseminating information through various channels such as radio, printed pamphlets, and digital media.
