= Qatar 2025 =

Qatar 2025 may refer to:

- 2025 in Qatar, showing the events that took place in Qatar in 2025.

== Association football ==
- 2025 FIFA Arab Cup
- 2025 FIFA U-17 World Cup
