= Zone 85, Qatar =

Zone 85
- Zone
- Interactive map of Zone 85
- Coordinates: 25.345768°N 51.024324°E
- Country: Qatar
- Municipality: Al-Shahaniya
- Blocks: 53

Area
  - Total: 423.2 km^{2} (163.4 sq mi)

Population (2015)
  - Total: 1,308
  - Density: 3.091/km^{2} (8.005/sq mi)
- Time zone: UTC+03 (Arabia Standard Time)
- ISO 3166 code: QA-SH

Zone 85 is a zone in the municipality of Al-Shahaniya in the state of Qatar. The main district recorded in the 2015 population census was Al Nasraniya.

Other districts which fall within its administrative boundaries are Al Kharsaah, Al Owaina, Al Salamiya, and Umm Taqa.

== Demographics ==
As of the 2010 census, the zone comprised 288 housing units and 149 establishments. There were 1,043 people living in the zone, of which 80% were male and 20% were female. Out of the 1,043 inhabitants, 84% were 20 years of age or older and 16% were under the age of 20. The literacy rate was 89.2%.

Employed persons made up 77% of the total population. Females accounted for 10% of the working population, while males accounted for 90% of the working population. Nearly half the working population (365) are employed in construction, while 204 are employed in agriculture and 61 are employed in public administration and defense.

Year	Population
1986	443
1997	490
2004	593
2010	1,043
2015	1,308

== Land use ==
The Ministry of Municipality and Environment (MME) breaks down land use in the zone as follows.

Area (km^{2})	Developed land (km^{2})	Undeveloped land (km^{2})	Residential (km^{2})	Commercial/ Industrial (km^{2})	Education/ Health (km^{2})	Farming/ Green areas (km^{2})	Other uses (km^{2})
423.19	35.28	387.91	0.42	0.00	0.02	3.51	31.33
