= Abu Sidrah =

Abu Sidrah أَبُو سِدْرَة
- Village
- Location in Qatar
- Coordinates: 25°43′23″N 51°00′15″E
- Country: Qatar
- Municipality: Al-Shahaniya
- Zone: Zone 73
- District no.: 256

Area
  - Total: 2.9 sq mi (7.6 km^{2})

Abu Sidrah (Arabic: أَبُو سِدْرَة, romanized: Abū Sidrah) is a village in northwest Qatar located in the municipality of Al-Shahaniya. According to the Ministry of Environment, there were about five households in the village in 2014.

It is accessible through Al Jemailiya Road. The settlements of Al Suwaihliya, to the north, and Al Jemailiya, to the south, are nearby.

== Etymology ==
Abu in Arabic means "father", and is commonly used as a prefix for geographical features. The Sidra component refers to Ziziphus nummularia, a tree that frequently occurs around the rawda (depression) which the village is centered around.

== Gallery ==
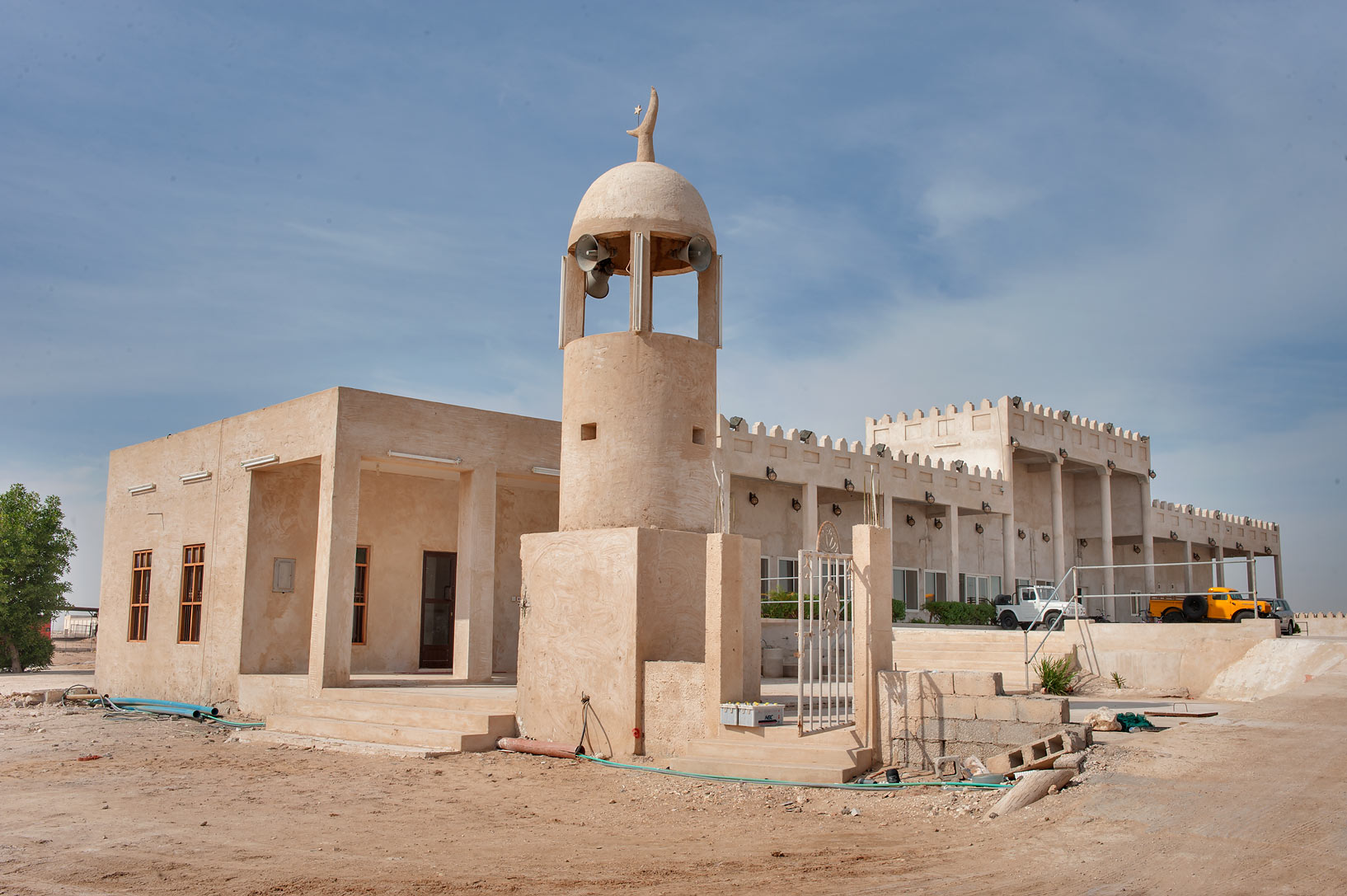
Small mosque in Abu Sidrah
