= Al Suwaihliya =

Al Suwaihliya السويحليه
- Village
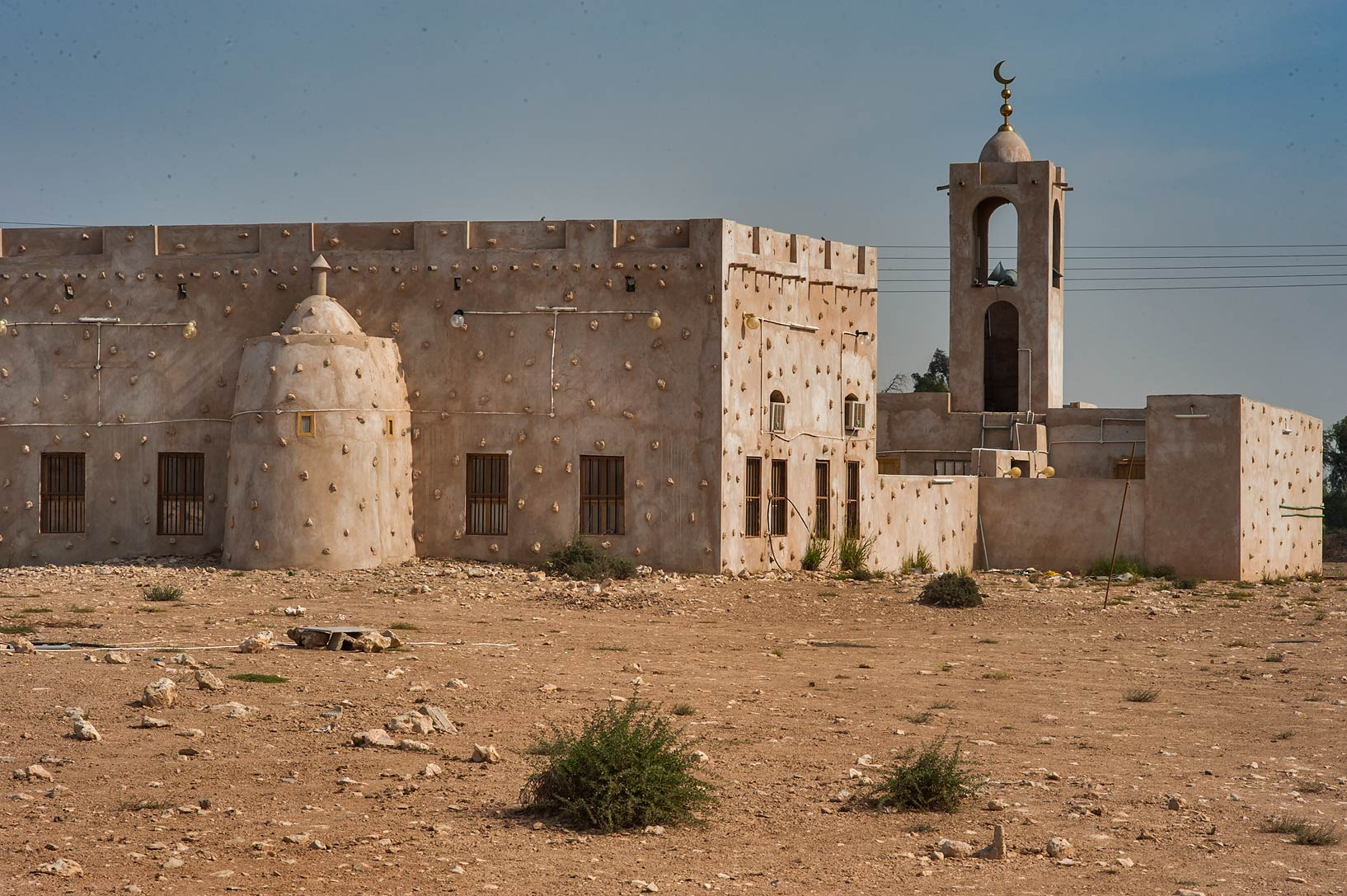
- Al Suwaihliya Mosque

- Location in Qatar
- Coordinates: 25°45′55″N 51°01′11″E
- Country: Qatar
- Municipality: Al-Shahaniya
- Zone: Zone 73
- District no.: 252

Area
  - Total: 5.2 sq mi (13.4 km^{2})

Al Suwaihliya (Arabic: السويحليه, romanized: As Suwayḩilīyah) is a village in northwest Qatar located in the municipality of Al-Shahaniya. According to the Ministry of Environment, there were eight households in the village in 2014.

It is accessible through Al Jemailiya Road. The village of Abu Sidrah is nearby to the south.

== Etymology ==
Al Suwaihliya's name originates from the Arabic word sahil, which translates to "coast". It earned this name from its geographic proximity to the Persian Gulf.

== History ==
Based on field work carried out by anthropologists in Qatar in the 1950s, the main tribe in the area of Al Suwaihliya were the Al Ramzan branch of the Na'im tribe. The area served as a sort of summer camp for the Al Na'im, containing stone dwellings that were occupied from February to October, before they moved to Al Jemailiya at the start of fall. These structures, located near spring encampments and wells in the area, were constructed primarily of rough coral or limestone blocks bound by clay or earth mortar. Walls typically measured 40–55 cm in thickness, with heights ranging from 2.3 to 2.5 meters.

The structures included air vents with flat stones for reinforcement. The exterior walls were coated with clay for protection against the elements, requiring annual maintenance due to exposure to wind and rain. Inside, walls were meticulously plastered, with shelves for storage. Roofs were fashioned from layers of palm ribs, bound together with ropes and supported by beams and planks. A final layer of clay and gravel provided insulation, allowing the rooms to be used for sleeping during hot summer nights. These houses were notably smaller than the winter tents typically used by the Al Na'im, primarily accommodating the immediate family while guests were entertained in separate rooms or summer tents.

These dwellings were not used to shelter livestock, distinguishing them from the traditional tents used by Bedouins. The Al Na'im's summer houses were approximately 27 square meters in size, with additional space provided by nearby summer tents.

== Geography ==
Al Suwaihliya is situated in Qatar's northwest region. It forms part of the eastern boundary of the southern section of the interior plain region. The area is characterized by relatively flat terrain with some undulations.
