= Constitution of Qatar =

Fundamental law of Qatar

Qatari Constitution

Overview
- Jurisdiction: Qatar
- Date effective: 9 April 2004
- System: Unitary semi-constitutional monarchy

Government structure
- Branches: Three (Executive, Legislative and Judiciary)
- Head of state: Emir of Qatar
- Chambers: Consultative Assembly of Qatar
- Executive: Prime Minister of Qatar; Cabinet of Qatar
- Federalism: No
- Signatories: 2003 Qatari constitutional referendum

Full text
- Constitution of Qatar at Wikisource

The Constitution of Qatar (Arabic: دستور قطر Dastūr Qatar) is the supreme law of the State of Qatar. It came into effect on 9 April 2004. The constitution was overwhelmingly approved, with almost 97% in favour.

== Parts of the Constitution ==
Unlike many constitutions, the Constitution of Qatar has no preamble.

Some of the most important articles in the constitution are listed below:

=== Part One ===
1. Article 1 – Islam is official religion of the state, and sharia a principal source of legislation. Its political system is democratic. Arabic is the official language.
2. Article 2 – Doha is the capital of the state. It can be transferred to any other place by law. The state cannot cede any of its territory.
3. Article 8 – The ruling family of the state is the House of Thani. Rule shall be passed down from father to son; in the case that there is no son, rule shall be passed to whomever the emir names heir apparent.
4. Article 9 – The heir apparent must be a Muslim of a Qatari Muslim mother.
5. Article 16 – If the heir apparent is named head of state and is less than 18 years old, then rule shall be passed to a regency council with the majority of members to be amongst the ruling family.

=== Part Two ===
1. Article 22 – The state shall provide care for the young, and protect them from corruption, exploitation, and the evils of physical, mental, and spiritual neglect. The state shall also create conducive circumstances for developing their capabilities in all fields based on sound education.
2. Article 23 – The state shall ensure, foster, and endeavour to spread education.
3. Article 27 – Private property is inviolable.
4. Article 29 – Natural wealth and its resources are the property of the state.

=== Part Three ===
1. Article 34 – The citizens of Qatar shall be equal in public rights and duties.
2. Article 35 – Before the law, all persons are equal and shall not be discriminated by sex, race, language, or religion.
3. Article 36 – Personal freedom is guaranteed. Torture is punishable by law.
4. Article 37 – Human privacy is inviolable.
5. Article 47 – Freedom of expression is guaranteed in accordance with the conditions and circumstances set forth in law.
6. Article 48 – Freedom of press is guaranteed.
7. Article 49 – All citizens have the right to education.
8. Article 55 – Public funds are inviolable.
9. Article 57 – All people that reside in the state must abide by public order and morality.
10. Article 58 – Extradition of political refugees is prohibited. The law shall determine the conditions of granting political asylum.

=== Part Four ===
1. Article 64 – The emir is the head of state. He must be respected by all.
2. Article 66 – The emir represents the state, internally, externally, and in international relations.
3. Article 69 – The emir may declare martial law in exceptional cases specified by law.
4. Article 71 – Defensive war can be declared by Emiri decree. Aggressive war is prohibited.
5. Article 72 – The Prime Minister is appointed by the emir. He can also accept his resignation.

=== Part Five ===
1. Article 148 – No article of this constitution may be proposed for amendment before it being 10 years from the date the constitution has come into force.
