= 2027 in Qatar =

- Decades: 2000s; 2010s; 2020s; 2030s
- See also: Other events of 2027; History of Qatar

Events in the year 2027 in Qatar.

== Events ==
=== Predicted and scheduled ===
- 27 August–12 September – 2027 FIBA Basketball World Cup
- TBA – 2027 FIFA U-17 World Cup
