= Abdul Aziz Bin Khalid al-Ghanim =

Qatari politician (1903–1998)

- عبد العزيز بن خالد الغانم المعاضيد

Speaker of the Shura Council of Qatar
- In office 1 May 1972 – 8 December 1990

Personal details
- Born: Abdul Aziz Bin Khalid al-Ghanim al-Maadeed; 1903 Doha, Qatar
- Died: 1998 (aged 94–95)
- Profession: Diplomat, Politician

Abdul Aziz Bin Khalid al-Ghanim al-Maadeed (Arabic: عبد العزيز بن خالد الغانم المعاضيد, 1903–1998) was a Qatari diplomat and the first Speaker of the Shura Council of Qatar. He was selected as Speaker at the first meeting of the Council.
