= 2024 Qatari constitutional referendum =

- 5 November 2024
- Outcome: Approved

A referendum took place in Qatar on 5 November 2024 regarding the new revisions to the 2004 constitution. Some of the changes included strengthening the role of the emir and abolition of the elections to the Consultative Assembly, with its members being appointed instead. The referendum results were to be legally binding.

== Background ==
The first direct election for two-thirds of the Consultative Assembly took place in 2021. On 15 October 2024, Emir Tamim bin Hamad Al Thani announced plans for a referendum on whether to abolish direct elections to the Consultative Assembly and revert to an appointive system, saying that the election had affected relations within families and tribes and that it had assumed "an identity-based character that we are not equipped to handle, with potential complications over time that we would rather avoid".

== Results ==
On 6 November the Ministry of Interior announced that the referendum passed with 90.6% in favour. Turnout was at 84%.

Choice	Votes	%
For		90.6
Against		9.4
Total		
Registered voters/turnout		84

== Aftermath ==
Emir Tamim bin Hamad Al Thani said that the results of the referendum showed that "Qataris have celebrated ... the values of unity and justice". AP called it "yet another rollback in the hereditarily ruled Gulf Arab states of halting steps to embrace representational rule".
