= Zone 73, Qatar =

Zone 73
- Zone
- Interactive map of Zone 73
- Coordinates: 25.672084°N 51.078092°E
- Country: Qatar
- Municipality: Al-Shahaniya
- Blocks: 89

Area
  - Total: 623.3 km^{2} (240.7 sq mi)

Population (2015)
  - Total: 1,685
  - Density: 2.703/km^{2} (7.002/sq mi)
- Time zone: UTC+03 (Arabia Standard Time)
- ISO 3166 code: QA-SH

Zone 73 is a zone in the municipality of Al-Shahaniya in Qatar. The main district recorded in the 2015 population census was Al Jemailiya.

Other districts which fall within its administrative boundaries are Abu Sidrah, Al Qa'iya, Al Suwaihliya, and Lijmiliya Al Naeem.

== Demographics ==
As of the 2010 census, the zone comprised 429 housing units and 190 establishments. There were 1,706 people living in the zone, of which 60% were male and 40% were female. Out of the 1,706 inhabitants, 71% were 20 years of age or older and 29% were under the age of 20. The literacy rate stood at 91.5%.

Employed persons made up 59% of the total population. Females accounted for 27% of the working population, while males accounted for 73% of the working population.

| Year | Population |
|---|---|
| 1986 | 1,636 |
| 1997 | 1,303 |
| 2004 | 1,367 |
| 2010 | 1,706 |
| 2015 | 1,685 |

== Land use ==
The Ministry of Municipality and Environment's breakdown of land use in the zone is as follows.

| Area (km^{2}) | Developed land (km^{2}) | Undeveloped land (km^{2}) | Residential (km^{2}) | Commercial/ Industrial (km^{2}) | Education/ Health (km^{2}) | Farming/ Green areas (km^{2}) | Other uses (km^{2}) |
|---|---|---|---|---|---|---|---|
| 623.31 | 55.12 | 568.19 | 0.23 | 0.01 | 0.12 | 2.95 | 51.81 |
