= Hamda bint Hassan Al Sulaiti =

Qatari politician

Hamda bint Hassan Al Sulaiti is a Qatari politician. She is the Deputy Speaker in Qatar's Shura Council.

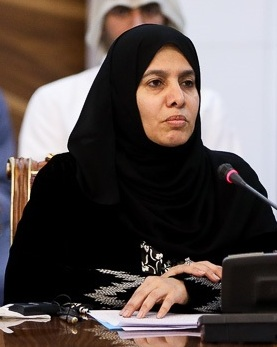

== Life ==
Al Sulaiti is CEO of the Scientific Excellence Award and Secretary General of the Qatar National Commission for Education, Culture and Science.

In October 2021 she was one of two women appointed by Sheikh Tamim bin Hamad Al-Thani to Qatar's Shura Council. In the Shura Council's first sitting, Al Sulaiti was elected Deputy Speaker, beating Ali bin Saeed Al-Khayarin and Saad bin Ahmed Al-Misned.

Al Sulaiti is the former vice president of the Arab League Educational, Cultural and Scientific Organization (ALECSO) which honored her in May 2022.
