= Al Jemailiya =

Al Jemailiya الجميلية
- Town
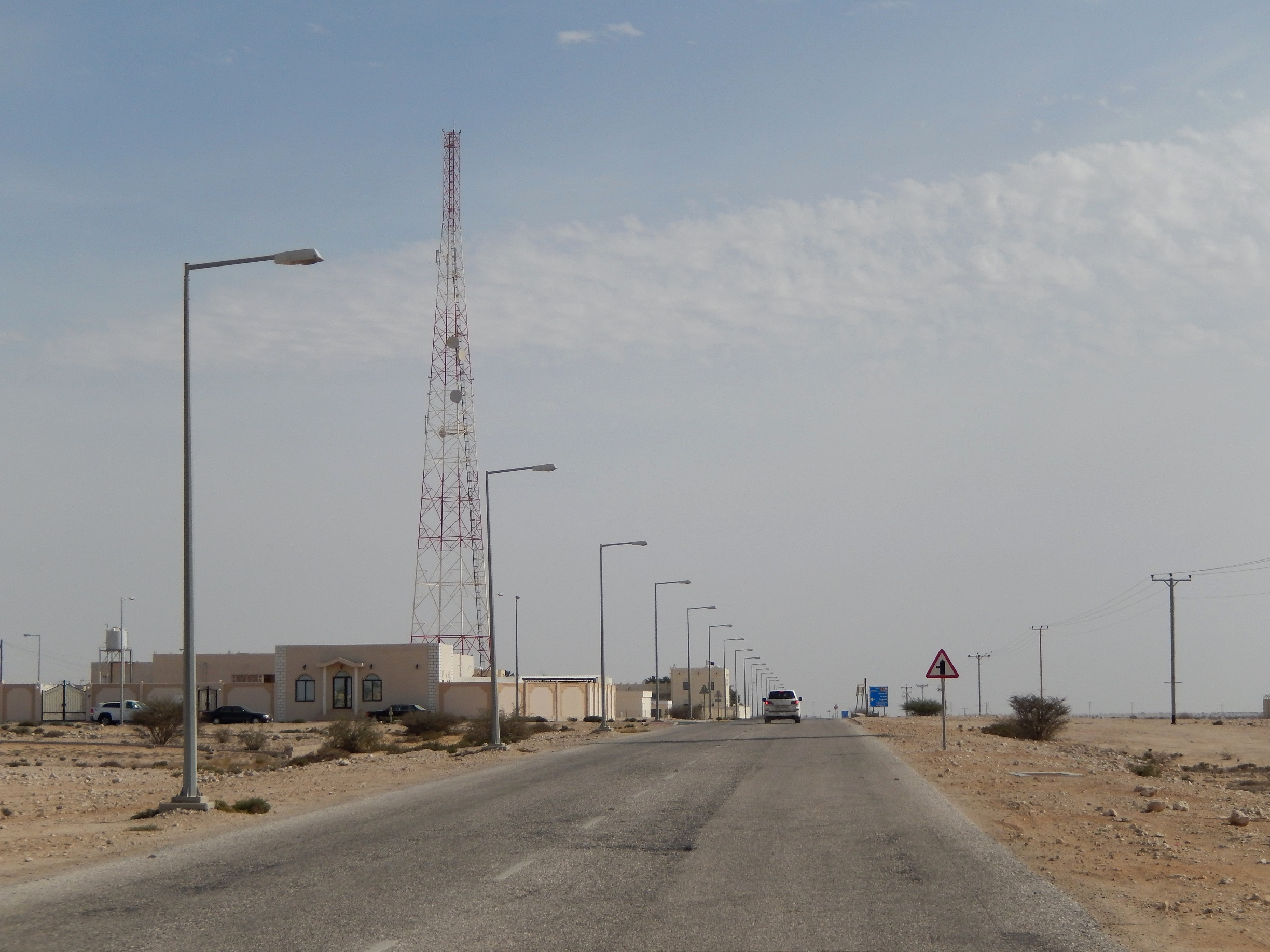
- Al Jemailiya Road, which links the northern and southern sections of the town

- Location within Qatar
- Coordinates: 25°37′15″N 51°4′55″E
- Country: Qatar
- Municipality: Al-Shahaniya
- Zone: Zone 73
- District no.: 210

Area
  - Total: 27.6 km^{2} (10.7 sq mi)

Al Jemailiya (Arabic: الجميلية, romanized: Al Jumaylīyah) is a town in the municipality of Al-Shahaniya, Qatar. It used to be the seat of Al Jemailiya Municipality before it was incorporated into Al Rayyan Municipality in 2004. In 2014, the town was incorporated into the newly created Al-Shahaniya Municipality. The town is roughly 30 km (19 mi) north-west of the Al-Shahaniya Exit of Dukhan Highway. It has been designated a District Centre for Al-Shahaniya Municipality, meaning that it is being developed to serve the needs of nearby communities, such as Al Suwaihliya.

== Etymology ==
The name derives from the Arabic word jamila, which means "beauty". It was so named because of its relative abundance of vegetation.

Various alternative transliterations of the name exist, such as Al Jumaliyah, Lijmiliya, Al Gummaylah and Al Jumaylīyah.

== History ==
In J. G. Lorimer's 1908 Gazetteer of the Persian Gulf, he mentions "Jimalīyah" as a nomadic outpost situated "16 miles (26 km) east-north-east of the foot of Doḩat Faishshākh". He stated that the inhabitants received good water from a masonry lined well at a depth of 18 fathoms.

During the 20th century, the town served as an autumn camp for the Na'im tribe, grazing their livestock here and alternating between Al Jemailiya, Murwab, and Al Suwaihliya. As part of an initiative by the government to provide housing for residents of rural areas, 60 new houses were built in Al Jemailiya in 1980.

In 1983–84, Al Jemailiya was included as part of a major project by the Ministry of Public Works valued at QAR 535 million to develop sewage infrastructure in the country's rural settlements.

Al Jemailiya was incorporated in Al-Shahaniya Municipality after the municipality was formed from parts of Al Rayyan Municipality in 2014. According to the Ministry of Municipality and Environment, there were about 75 total households within the town limits in 2014.

== Geography ==
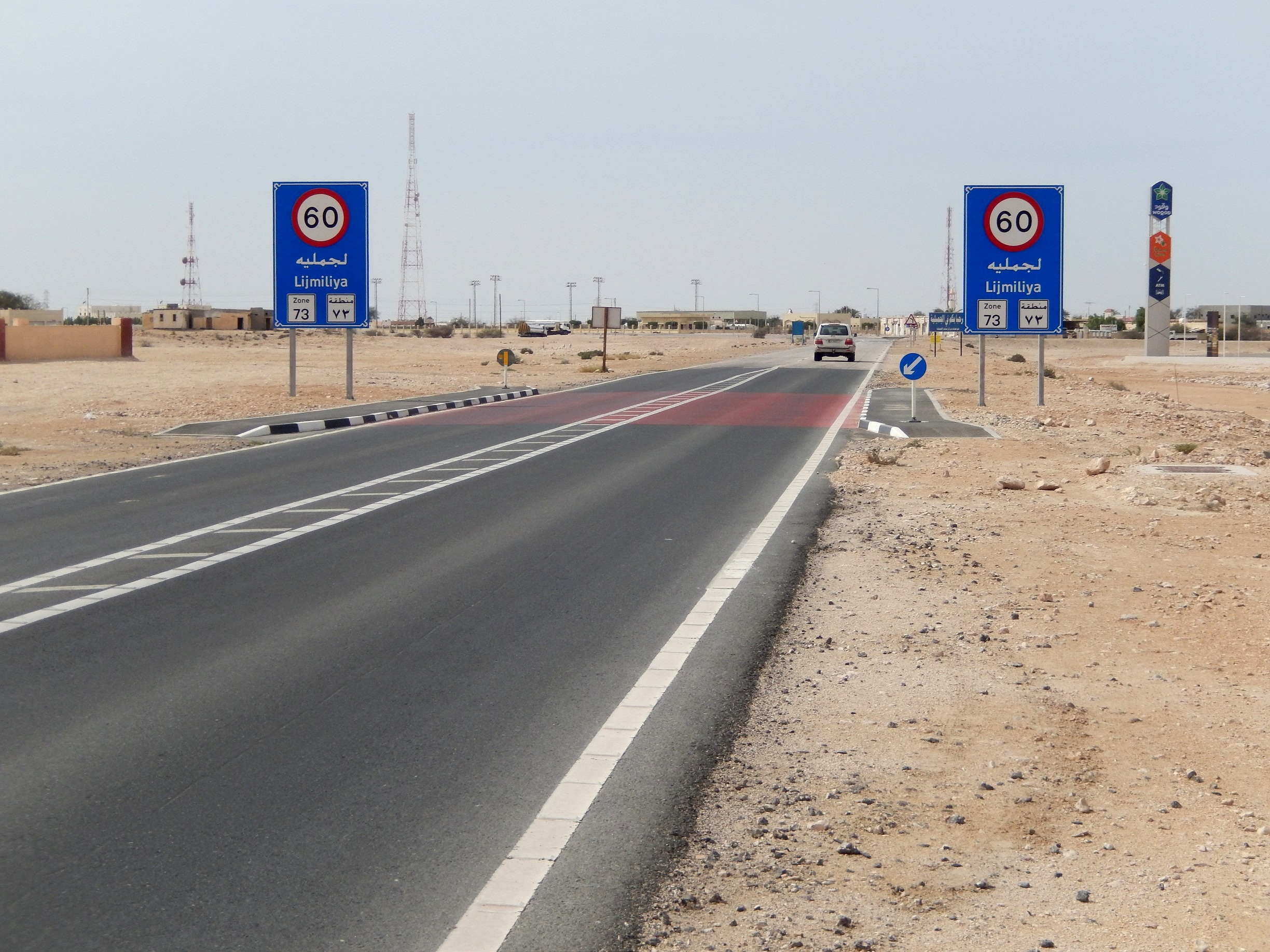
Entrance to Al Jemailiya

Al Jemailiya is in north-west Qatar. The village of Al Qa'iya is to the north-east. It forms part of the northern section of the central belt region. As part of this section, the area has varied topography, including hills, plateaus, and depressions, which distinguishes it from the flatter areas to the north and east. The area to the southeast of Al Jemailiya is notable for having some of the highest elevations in this part of Qatar. There are hills in this vicinity with elevations ranging between 41 metres (135 ft) to 49 metres (161 ft) above sea level.

The town is made up of two adjacent villages which formed around the Al Jemailiya well. Transport between the two sections is facilitated by Al Jemailiya Road and Lebsayyer Road. The two villages are:

- Al Jemailiya Al Naeem (25.634878°N 51.081674°E), the northern section which was named after the Na'im tribe.
- Al Jemailiya Al Shahwan (25.619924°N 51.082517°E), the southern and main section which was named after the Shahwan tribe.

== Al Jemailiya Municipality ==
Al Jemailiya Municipality's location.

In the 2004 census, when Al Jemailiya was a municipality, it was recorded as having administered Al Utouriya, Al Jemailiya (town), Umm Bab, Al Nasraniya, and Dukhan.

When it was a municipality, it bordered the following municipalities:

- Al Ghuwariyah - north
- Al Khawr - northeast
- Umm Salal - east
- Ar Rayyan - southeast
- Jariyan al Batnah - south

In 2004, Al Jemailiya Municipality was merged with Al Rayyan Municipality.

=== Municipality demographics ===
Al Jemailiya Municipality population
March 2004	March 1997	March 1986
10,303	9,836	7,217

In the 2004 census, out of a municipal population of 10,303, the number of Muslims amounted to 6,782, Christians amounted to 965, and the remaining 2,566 inhabitants identified as following other religions.

The following table is a breakdown of registered live births by nationality and sex for Al Jemailiya. Places of birth are based on the home municipality of the mother at birth.

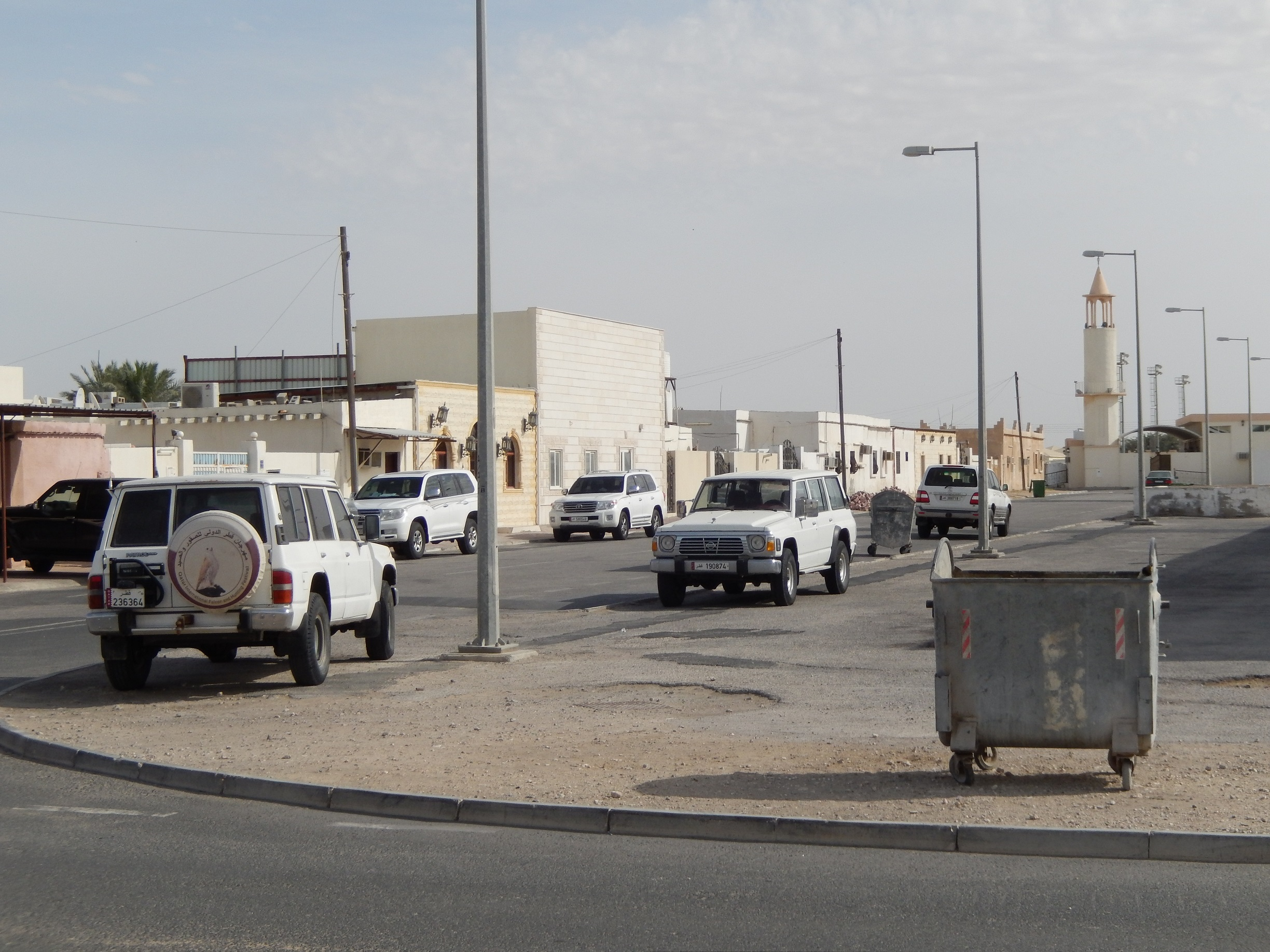
Neighborhood in Al Jemailiya.

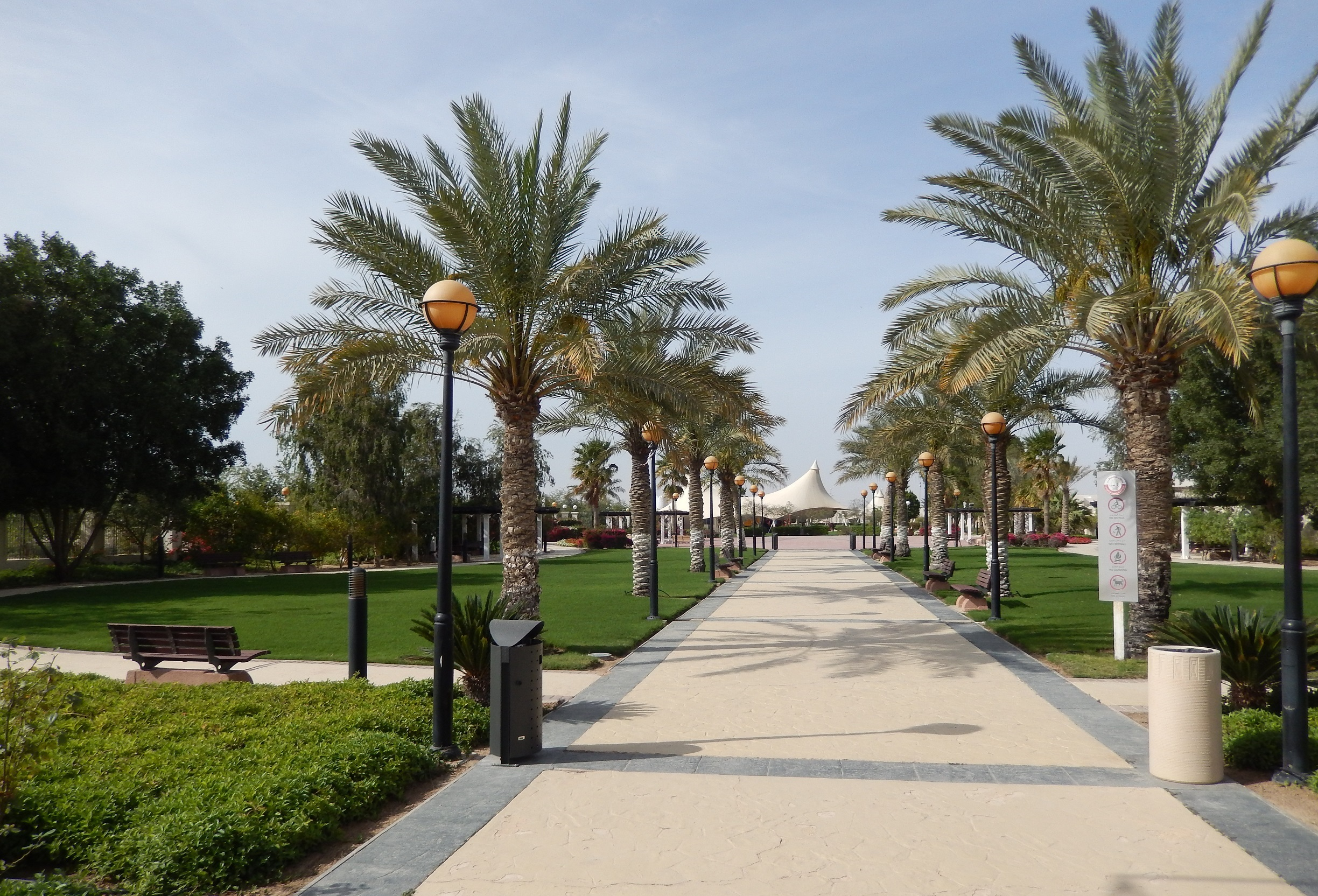
A park located in the central part of the town.

Registered live births by nationality and sex
Year	Qatari			Non-Qatari			Total		
Year	M	F	Total	M	F	Total	M	F	Total
2001	34	29	63	25	18	43	59	47	106
2002	72	68	140	22	26	48	94	94	188
2003	28	32	60	34	29	63	62	61	123
2004	26	34	60	18	18	36	44	52	96
2005	33	11	44	28	22	50	61	33	94
2006	24	37	61	30	34	64	54	71	125
2007	7	15	22	19	24	43	26	39	65

== Visitor attractions ==
=== Mosques ===
There are a number of mosques dating to the mid-20th century in the town. As a result of mass migration to the capital Doha over the years, most mosques were deserted.

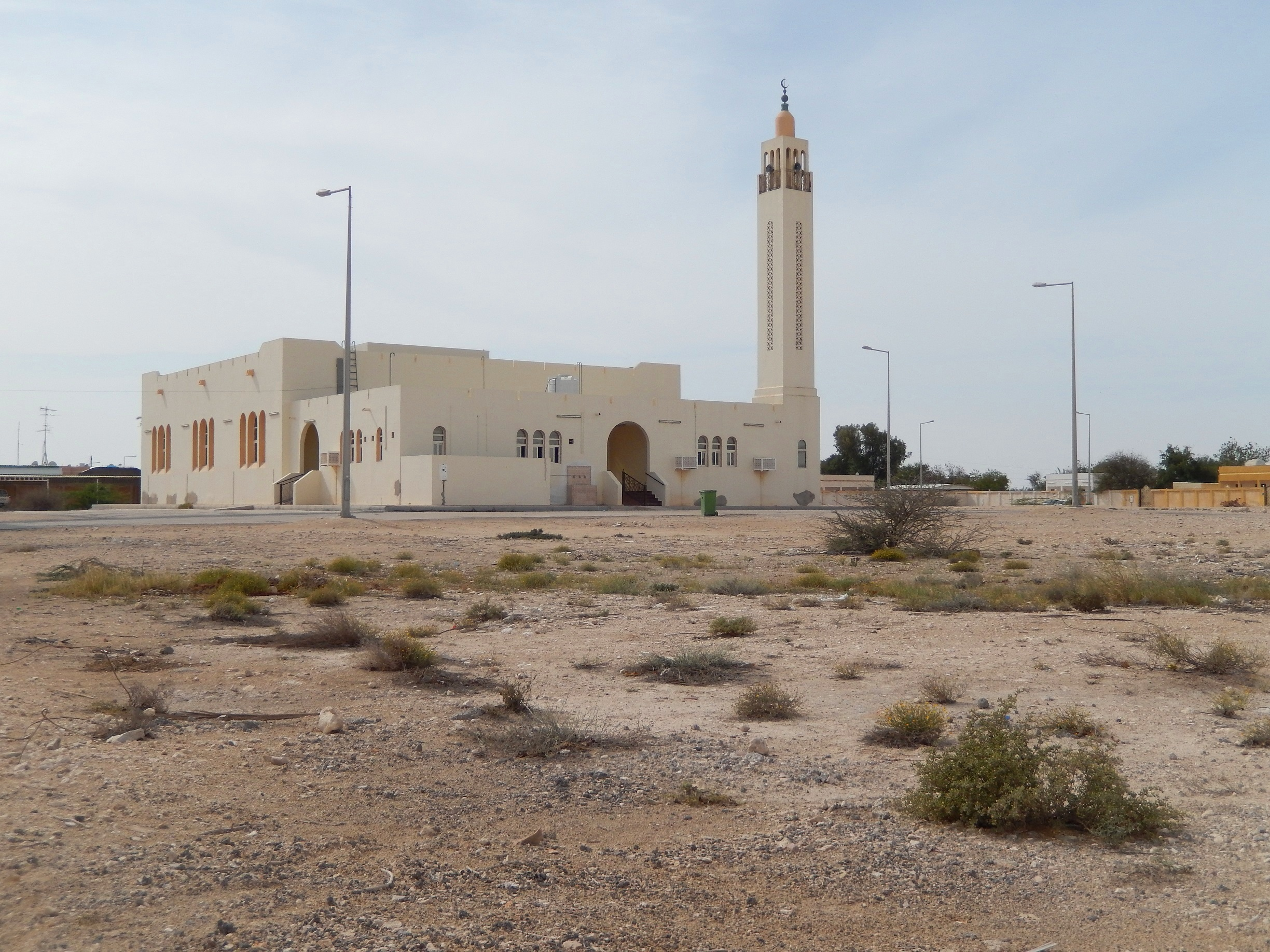
A mosque in Al Jemailiya.

Bin Duham Mosque, erected in 1942, is one of the few dilapidated mosques in Al Jemailiyah. It has two entrances on the north and south side, respectively. The minaret, in the north-east section, lies on a thin base and is barrel-shaped. An outdoor prayer area is accessible through four pathways in the courtyard, while the prayer hall has three entrances leading from the outdoor area. The roof covering the prayer areas was constructed using plaited reed mats overlain with a mixture of mud and straw.

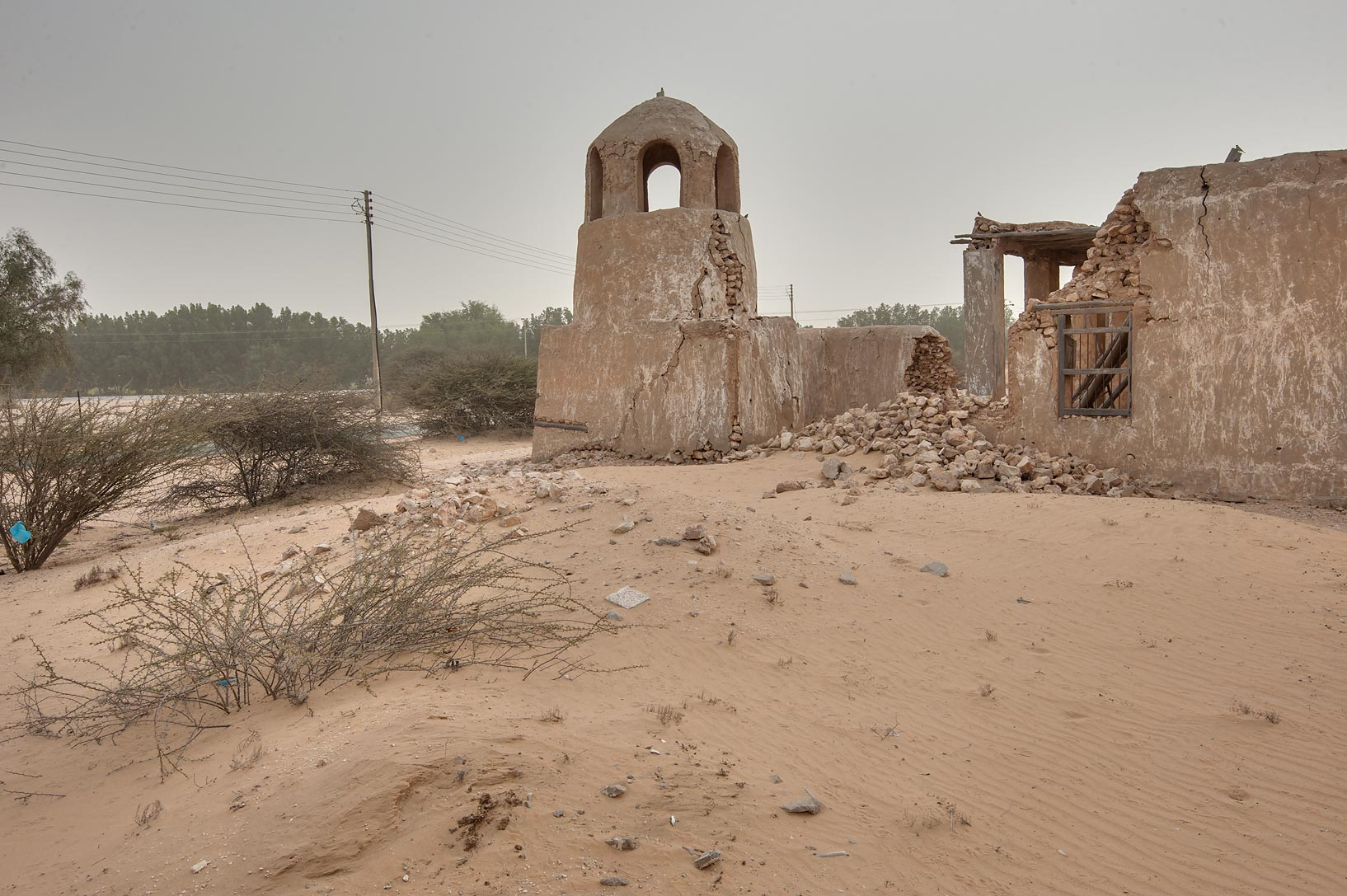
Ruined mosque in Al Jemaliya, on the outskirts of the Khalil bin Mubarak bin Atiq Al Mansouri Farm.

Another old mosque in the village is Al Suwaheet Mosque, which was constructed in 1940. It has two entrances in the east and south, respectively. Its minaret extends 7.3 m (24 ft) high and is separated into three segments of nearly equal size. The outdoor prayer area can be accessed through five rectangular pathways in the courtyard. There is also an indoor prayer hall.

The oldest and smallest mosque is Al Amiri Mosque. Opened in 1939, it continued to remain in operation after the abandonment of the other mosques. It has a southern and northern entrance. The minaret is small and has a narrow base with no ornamental markings. There are outer and inner prayer areas. The mosque has undergone a number of renovations in its history, resulting in its roof being overlain with corrugated metal and concrete block pathways being created for the open prayer area.

=== Al Jemailiya Youth Center ===
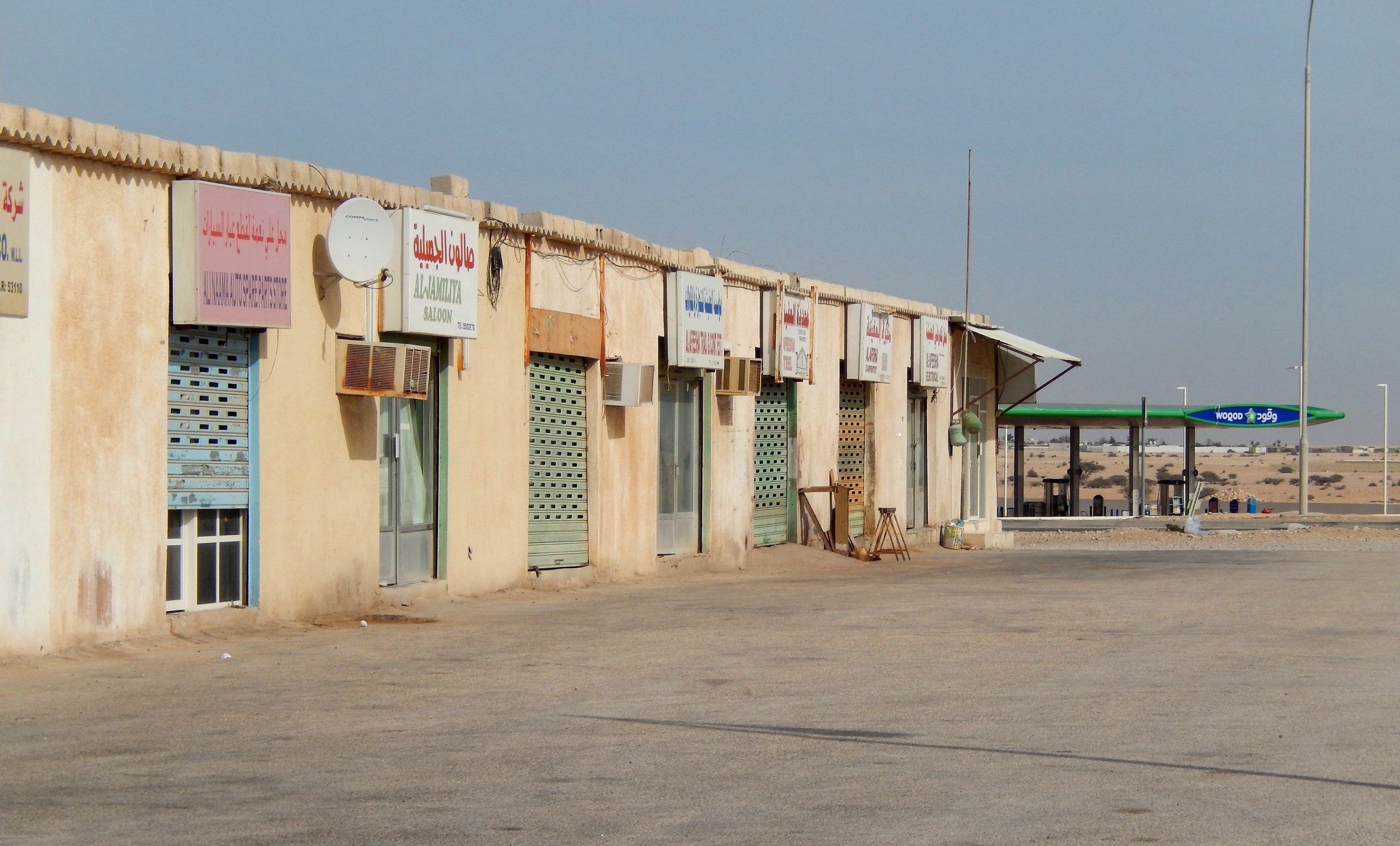
Shops in Al Jemailiya.

Al Jemailiya Youth Center was opened on 17 June 1996. Among the activities it organizes are Quran recitation, educational seminars and lectures, courses in information technology, and artistic pursuits such as painting classes and theatrical productions. It offers association football facilities and exercise equipment, and occasionally organizes and hosts local sports tournaments. Classes in Nabati poetry, also known as "Bedouin poetry", are also held here.

== Healthcare ==
As part of the Ministry of Municipality and Environment's Al Azab program to help improve the healthcare for livestock, a modern veterinary clinic was opened in the town.

Operated by the Primary Health Care Corporation (PHCC), the Al Jemailiya Health Center provides several laboratory and diagnostic services.

== Qatar National Master Plan ==
The Qatar National Master Plan (QNMP) is described as a "spatial representation of the Qatar National Vision 2030". As part of the QNMP's Urban Centre plan, which aims to implement development strategies in 28 central hubs that will serve their surrounding communities, Al Jemailiya has been designated a District Centre, which is the lowest designation.

Development in Al Jemailiya is oriented towards developing public services and constructing more mixed-use buildings so that it may serve the needs of nearby settlements. Some of the proposals include opening a themed retail complex and establishing a farmers' market. Among the buildings to be constructed as part of the plan are a 4,159 m^{2} (44,770 sq ft) civil defense centre, a similarly sized primary health care centre with emergency facilities, and a 22,278 m^{2} (239,800 sq ft) youth centre.

== Education ==
Name of School	Curriculum	Grade	Genders	Official Website	Ref
Al Jumailiya Girls Schools	Independent	Primary – Secondary	Female-only	N/A	
Al Jumailiya Boys Schools	Independent	Primary – Secondary	Male-only	N/A	
