= 2025 in Qatar =

- Decades: 2000s; 2010s; 2020s; 2030s
- See also: Other events of 2025; History of Qatar

Events in the year 2025 in Qatar.

== Incumbents ==
- Emir of Qatar – Tamim bin Hamad Al Thani

== Events ==
=== March ===
- 28 March – Nineteen Filipino nationals are arrested for holding an unauthorized political demonstration in support of former President Rodrigo Duterte.

=== April ===
- 27 April – The Qatari and Saudi Arabian finance ministries announce in a joint statement that they will pay off Syria's $15 million debt to the World Bank, which is finalized on 16 May.
- 28 April – The head of the Baháʼí Faith in Qatar, Remy Rowhani, is arrested on charges of promoting a "deviant sect" and casting doubt on Islamic religious principles. He is sentenced to five years' imprisonment on 13 August, but is acquitted on 1 October following an appeal.

=== June ===
- 3 June – Qatar records a budget deficit of 500 million riyals ($133.31 million) in the first quarter of 2025.
- 23 June – The Iranian Air Force launches ballistic missiles towards Al Udeid Air Base in Doha, which houses the U.S. Air Force. The missiles are intercepted by the Qatar Armed Forces. The foreign ministry closes the country's airspace in response to the attack. The airspace is reopened after a ceasefire.

=== July ===
- 19 July – Qatar hosts the signing of a ceasefire agreement between the government of the Democratic Republic of the Congo and the rebel group M23 as part of efforts to end the latter's rebellion.

=== September ===
- 9 September – Israel carries out an airstrike on Hamas political leaders in Doha who met to discuss an active hostage-truce deal proposal proposed by the US. The targeted officials survive and six others are killed, including a Qatari security officer.
- 15 September – An extraordinary joint session of the Arab League and the Organisation of Islamic Cooperation is held in Doha to formulate a response to the Israeli airstrike in Doha on 9 September.
- 29 September – Israeli prime minister Benjamin Netanyahu apologizes to Prime Minister Mohammed bin Abdulrahman bin Jassim Al Thani for violating Qatari sovereignty during the 2025 Israeli strike on Doha.

=== October ===
- 10 October – US defense secretary Pete Hegseth announces an agreement with Qatar that would allow the Qatar Emiri Air Force to establish a facility at the Mountain Home Air Force Base in the state of Idaho.
- 11 October – A car crash kills three Qatari Amiri Diwan employees and injures two others while they were heading to Sharm El Sheikh.

=== November ===
- 25 November – Canada lifts visa requirements for Qatari citizens.

=== December ===
- 8 December — Saudi Arabia and Qatar sign an agreement to build a high-speed railway connecting Riyadh and Doha.

=== Sports ===
- 14 October – Qatar qualifies for the 2026 FIFA World Cup after defeating the United Arab Emirates 2-1 at the 2026 FIFA World Cup qualification in Doha.
- 3–27 November – 2025 FIFA U-17 World Cup
- 30 November–18 December – 2025 FIFA Arab Cup
