= Mohamed Bin Mubarak al-Khulaifi =

Qatari politician (born 1946)

Mohamed Mubarak al-Khulaifi
- محمد بن مبارك الخليفي

Speaker of the Shura Council of Qatar
- In office 27 March 1995 – 14 November 2017
- Preceded by: Ali bin Khalifa Al Hitmi
- Succeeded by: Ahmad bin Abdullah Al Mahmoud

Personal details
- Born: 1946 (age 79–80) Doha, Qatar
- Education: Arizona University
- Profession: Diplomat, politician, lawyer, peace negotiator

Dr. Mohamed bin Mubarak al-Khulaifi (Arabic: محمد بن مبارك الخليفي, born 1946) is a Qatari diplomat, lawyer, peace negotiator, and a former Speaker of the Shura Council of Qatar.

Al-Khulaifi served as the ambassador to Kuwait 1972-1981, and ambassador at the ministry of foreign affairs 1981-1991. In 1990, he was appointed to the Shura Council, and elected as the Speaker in 1995. He served until 2017, when he was a lawyer at the Qatari Court of Cassation.
