= 2023 in Qatar =

- Decades: 2000s; 2010s; 2020s; 2030s
- See also: Other events of 2023; History of Qatar

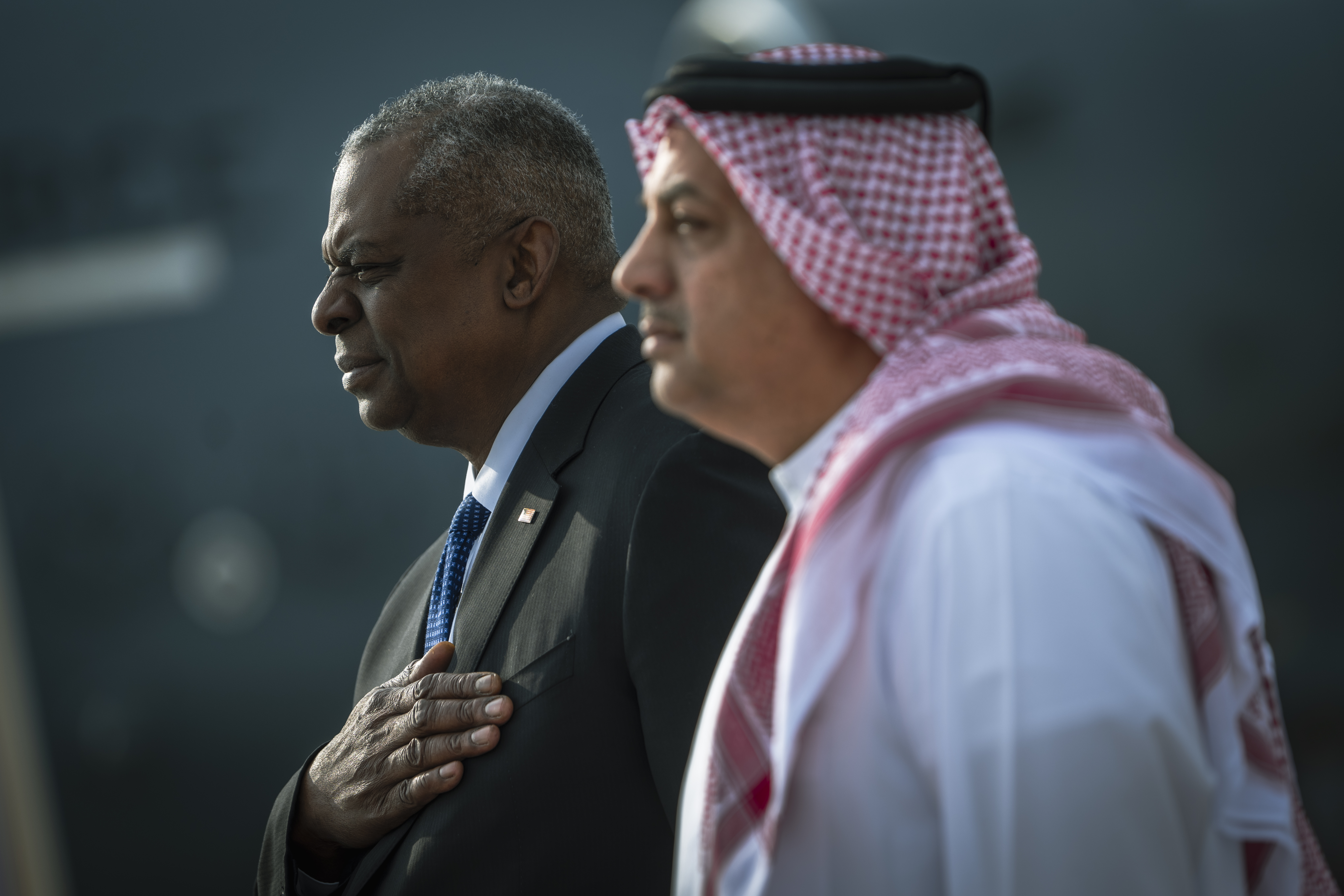
Secretary of Defense Lloyd J. Austin III and Qatari Minister of Defense Khalid bin Mohamed al Attyah meet in 2023.

Events in the year 2023 in Qatar.

== Incumbents ==
- Emir of Qatar – Tamim bin Hamad Al Thani

== Events ==
Ongoing — COVID-19 pandemic in Qatar

- March: The Fifth UN Conference on the Least Developed Countries is held in Doha, Qatar.
- 13 to 18 February: 2023 Qatar Total Open, a women's outdoor hard court tennis tournament.
- 20 to 25 February : 2023 Qatar ExxonMobil Open, a men's outdoor hard court tennis tournament, was held for the 31st time in 2023. It was held at the Khalifa International Tennis and Squash Complex in Doha, Qatar.
- 7 to 14 May: The 2023 World Judo Championships took place at the Ali Bin Hamad al-Attiyah Arena in Doha, Qatar.
- 2 October 2023 - March 28, 2024: Expo 2023 is an International Horticultural Expo to be hosted by Doha, Qatar.
- 23 October: Qatar's Emir Tamim Bin Hamad Al Thani has warned the escalation of fighting in Gaza poses a threat to the region and the world. He asserted Israel should not be given a "green light for unconditional killing".
- 8 October: The 2023 Qatar Grand Prix, at the Lusail International Circuit in Lusail, Qatar.
- 28 December: A court in Qatar reduces the sentences of eight retired Indian Navy officers who had been sentenced to death for spying.
- 19 November, 2023: The Qatar Airways Grand Prix of Qatar was the nineteenth round of the 2023 Grand Prix motorcycle racing season.

=== Sports ===
- May: The 2023 World Judo Championships were held in Doha, Qatar.
