= Al Owaina =

Al Owaina لعوينة
- Village
- Location in Qatar
- Coordinates: 25.44165°N 50.95793°E
- Country: Qatar
- Municipality: Al-Shahaniya
- Zone: Zone 85
- District no.: 619

Area
  - Total: 1.9 sq mi (4.9 km^{2})

Al Uwaynah (Arabic: لعوينة; also spelled Leawaina and Al Owaina) is a small village in western Qatar located in the municipality of Al-Shahaniya. The closest sizable settlement is the industrial city of Dukhan. Situated to the immediate south of the Dukhan Highway, the capital Doha is located some 50 miles (80 km) away. Similar to many other rural settlements in Qatar, its population rapidly fell in the late 20th century amidst government efforts to resettle rural residents to Doha.

== Etymology ==
The name Owaina originated from the Arabic word ʿayn, which is the term used for a natural source of freshwater. In this case, it was the name given to a nearby well, from which the entire area later took its name.

== Infrastructure ==
In July 1985, the government announced it had begun a campaign to distribute fresh water to rural villages in Qatar suffering from water shortages. As part of this campaign, QAR 125,000 was allocated towards water distribution in Al Owaina.

Hejen Racing Committee maintains a camel hospital in the village called Tharb Camel Hospital. It is the first hospital of its kind in the country. The hospital doubles as a camel breeding center and is strategically located in the isolated west in order to avoid the negative effects of urbanization on the health of the camels.

UrbaCon General Contracting carried out the Leawaina Majlis Project to the improve infrastructure of the village in 2012.

== Historical landmarks ==
=== Al Owaina Mosque ===
The Al Owaina Mosque, erected in 1945, is still in operation despite the depopulation of the village. The mosque is accessed via entrances on the northern and southern exterior walls of the courtyard. The southern entrance has been blocked by a newly constructed house for the imam, which is attached to the mosque. The courtyard, covered with square concrete tiles, forms a slightly irregular square, approximately 12 meters per side. Both the mosque and its interior spaces are slightly skewed due to the north side being longer than the south.

In the northeast corner of the courtyard, the minaret rises from an irregular square base equal in height to the courtyard walls. A blue wooden door opens to a spiral staircase ascending the minaret's interior. This cylindrical tower is topped by a long, conical roof, supported by six square columns forming a hexagonal shape. These pillars, each around 1 meter high, provide six spaces for the muezzin to issue the adhan. The original imam's residence, situated in the southeast corner of the courtyard, now serves as the ablution area. A newer, more extensive residence extends from the southern courtyard wall, covering an area equivalent to the mosque's.

The outer iwan opens to the courtyard through five rectangular entrances, built in a straightforward post and lintel style typical of many Qatari mosques from the 1940s. Windows are located at both ends of the outer iwan on the north and south facade walls, with no evidence of badghirs above them. Three evenly spaced doors lead from the outer iwan into the enclosed iwan of the mihrab, with the central door aligning with the mihrab. The wooden doors are more recent additions than the mosque itself.

The enclosed iwan is somewhat broader than the open iwan. The qibla wall features two openings separated by a square pillar, with the imam's bench positioned in the right opening. The iwans' roof is traditionally constructed with danshil beams overlain with baszhil (bamboo) and mangharour (mats made of rattan branches) and coated with mud plaster. The roof slopes a little from the center, enabling water to drain through openings in the front and rear parapet walls, which have wooden drain spouts attached.
