= Solar power in Qatar =

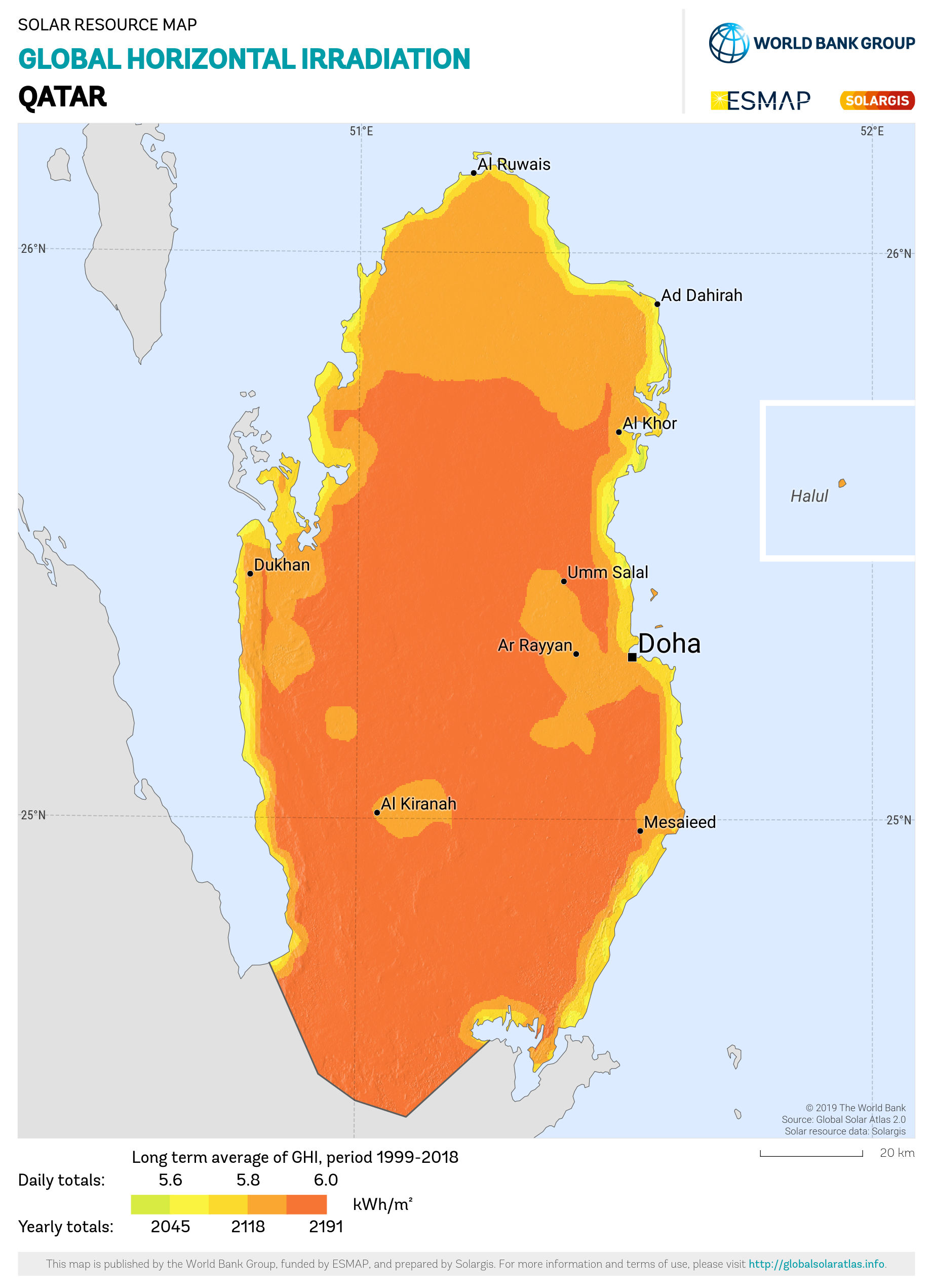
Solar potential

As of April 2025, Qatar has 1.7 gigawatts of installed solar power capacity, equivalent to 15% of the country's peak electricity demand.

Qatar has an average global horizontal irradiance of 2,140 kWh/m^{2} per year.

== Projects ==
=== Al-Kharsaah ===
The Al-Kharsaah plant was commissioned in October 2022 as the first photovoltaic power plant in Qatar. It has a generation capacity of 800 MW and covers 10 square kilometres (3.9 sq mi).

=== Ras Laffan and Mesaieed ===
The Ras Laffan and Mesaieed plants cover 20 square kilometres (7.7 sq mi) and were commissioned in April 2025. The Ras Laffan plant has a capacity of 458 MW while the Mesaieed plant has a capacity of 417 MW.

=== Dukhan ===
The Dukhan plant was announced in 2024 and has a projected capacity of 2 GW. It is scheduled to be commissioned in 2028 and 2029. Samsung C&T Corporation has been contracted to build the plant.

== Air conditioning ==
Qatar is known for its solar air conditioning technology.
