= Hassan bin Abdulla al-Ghanim =

Qatari politician (born 1955)

- حسن بن عبدالله الغانم

Speaker of the Shura Council of Qatar
- Incumbent
- Assumed office 26 October 2021
- Preceded by: Ahmad bin Abdullah Al Mahmoud

Personal details
- Born: 1955 (age 70–71)
- Education: University of Portland
- Profession: Diplomat and politician

Hassan bin Abdulla al-Ghanim (Arabic: حسن بن عبدالله الغانم, born in 1955) is a Qatari politician and diplomat, and the current Speaker of the Shura Council of Qatar since October 2021.

He earned a political science degree from the University of Portland in 1980. Al-Ghanim has served in the diplomatic corps of the ministry of foreign affairs, and in Qatar Embassy in Washington, D.C., Riyadh and Jeddah. From 1996 to 1999 he was under-secretary of ministry of electricity and water. In January 1999 he was appointed as minister of justice, a position which he held until 2013.

On 26 October 2021 he was elected by the Council to be its Speaker.
