= Al Kharsaah =

Al Kharsaah الخرسعة
- Village
- Location in Qatar
- Coordinates: 25.2712°N 50.9680°E
- Country: Qatar
- Municipality: Al-Shahaniya
- District no.: 604

Area
  - Land: 3.1 sq mi (8.0 km^{2})
- Elevation: 105 ft (32 m)

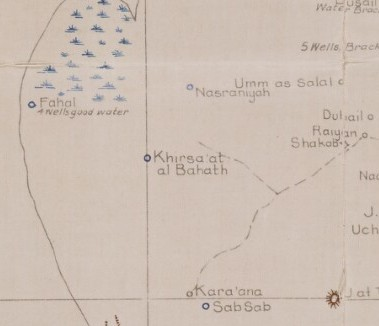
Sketch map of the Qatar Peninsula drawn in 1935 depicting Al Kharsaah

Al Kharsaah (Arabic: الخرسعة; also spelled Al Khuraisa) is a village in Qatar located in the municipality of Al-Shahaniya, approximately 80 km west of the capital Doha. Nearby areas include Umm Washah, Umm Al-Jaljam, Umm Bab and Umm Taqa. It hosts a stage of the Qatar International Rally.

== Etymology ==
The name Al Kharsaah is derived from the local Arabic term kharsaah, which refers to a natural depression or hollow in the ground. According to local tradition, these features were believed to have formed as a result of falling stars. Geologically, however, they are the product of limestone dissolution near the surface, which is a preliminary stage in the formation of sinkholes or caverns. The village was named after one such notable depression in the area.

== History ==
In 1908, J.G. Lorimer documented Al Kharsaah in his Gazetteer of the Persian Gulf, giving its location as "11 miles north-east of the foot of Dohat as-Salwa and 6 from the west coast". He refers to it as a Bedouin camping ground and notes that there is good water at 18 fathoms in a masonry well.

== Geography ==
Al Kharsaah has a very low elevation and there is a small amount of vegetation. Locals speculate that the area was the site of a meteorite impact, owing to its low elevation and rough surface. However, Qatari geologists believe that the area was once a large cave, but that natural factors caused the ceiling of the cave to collapse.

== Infrastructure ==
The village has 30 houses, half of which are inhabited full-time, and the other half of which are inhabited only on the weekends by locals who spend most of their time in Doha. Public services are limited. There are two primary schools; one for boys and one for girls.

In July 1985, the Qatari government allocated QAR 5,000 towards fresh water distribution in Al Kharsaah.

The Qatar Electricity and Water Company (QEWC) designated land in Al Kharsaah for a major solar power project in 2017. As part of the project, a solar power plant with a production capacity of 500 MW was planned to be inaugurated by 2020. Costs of the projects were predicted to be upwards of $500 million. The Al-Kharsaah Solar Power Plant was commissioned in October 2022 with a nameplate capacity of 800 MW as Qatar's first large solar plant.
