= Al Nasraniya =

Al Nasraniya النصرانية
- Village
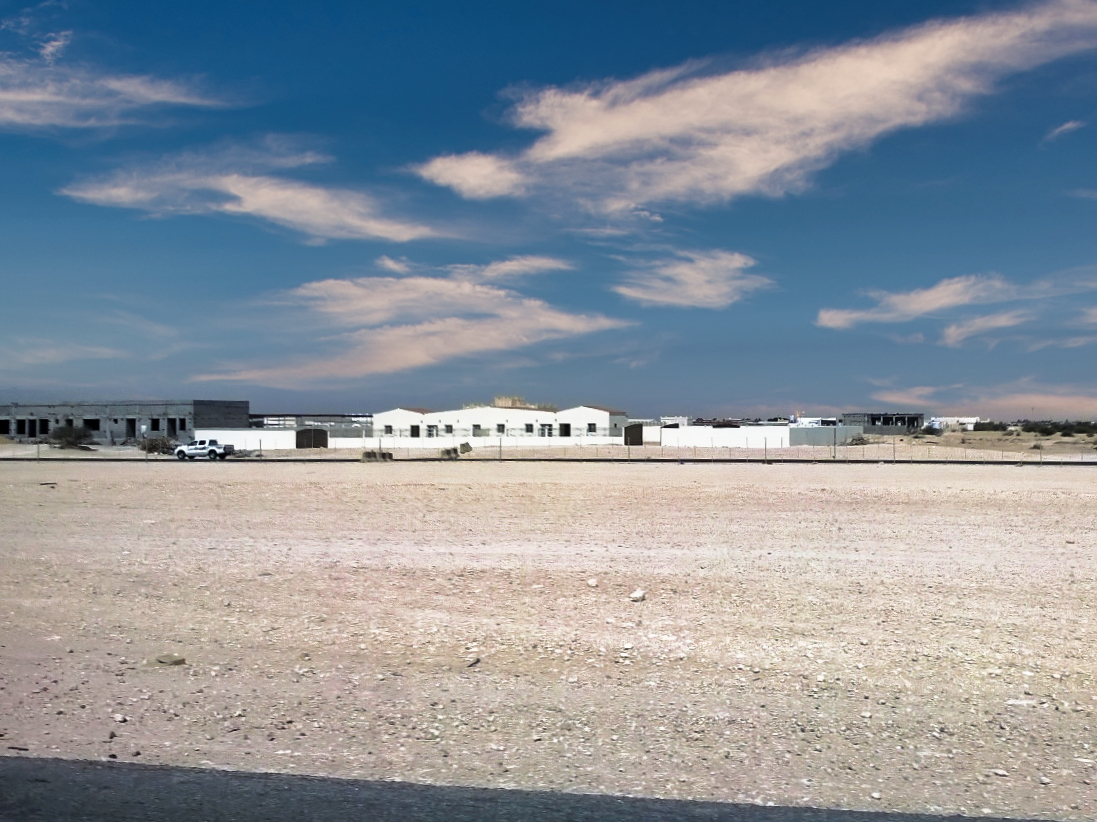
- View of Al Nasranniya from Dukhan Highway

- Location within Qatar
- Coordinates: 25°24′11″N 51°04′23″E
- Country: Qatar
- Municipality: Al-Shahaniya
- Zone: Zone 85
- District no.: 568

Area
  - Total: 29.6 km^{2} (11.4 sq mi)

Al Nasraniya (Arabic: النصرانية, romanized: An Naşrānīyah) is a village in Qatar, located in the municipality of Al-Shahaniya. It was demarcated in 1988. It used to be part of the Al Jemailiya municipality before the municipality was incorporated into Al Rayyan. In 2014, the settlement was incorporated into the newly created Al-Shahaniya Municipality.

== Etymology ==
Nasraniya was named after a local well with a depth exceeding 25 fathoms. The name is derived from the Arabic verb naṣara, which in certain contexts translates to "to water abundantly", reflecting the importance of the well.

== History ==
J.G. Lorimer mentioned Nasraniya in 1908 in his Gazetteer of the Persian Gulf, stating that it lies "11 miles south of the foot of Dohat Faishsākh and 16 miles west from the coast" and remarked on the presence of a masonry well, 25 fathoms (150 feet) deep, yielding good water.

== Infrastructure ==
After Qatar received substantial profits from its oil extraction activities in the 1960s and 1970s, it launched many housing projects for its citizens. As part of this initiative, 40 houses were built in Al Nasraniya by 1976.

Two government buildings are based in Al Nasraniya. They belong to the Ministry of Municipality and Environment, which has an office in the village. There are no health care facilities.

== Gallery ==
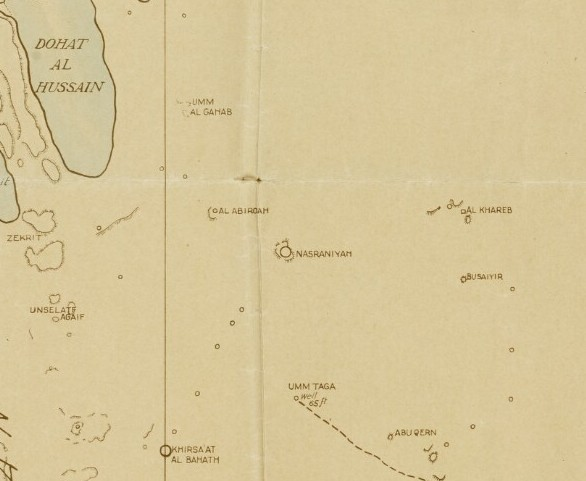
Sketch map depicting Al Nasraniya drawn in 1933.
