= Shura Council of Qatar =

Legislative body of the State of Qatar

Shura Council of Qatar مجلس الشورى القطري
- 51st Session

Type
- Type: Unicameral

History
- Founded: April 1972

Leadership
- Speaker: Hassan bin Abdulla Al-Ghanim since 27 October 2021
- Deputy Speaker: Hamda bint Hassan Al-Sulaiti since 27 October 2021

Structure
- Seats: 45
- Political groups: Appointed by Emir (45)
- Length of term: 4 years

Elections
- Voting system: As of November 2024, all 45 seats are appointed by Emir
- Last election: 2 October 2021

Meeting place
- Doha; State of Qatar

Website
- https://www.shura.qa

The Qatari Shura Council (Arabic: مجلس الشورى القطري, romanized: Majlis as-Shura; also known as the Consultative Assembly) is the unicameral advisory legislative body of the State of Qatar, which holds limited power. It is fully appointed by the emir.

The body has the authority to approve "general state policies and the budget", but "has no say in the setting of defence, security, economic and investment policy". Its legislation on other matters must be ratified by the emir, and although the Council may overrule that veto with a two-thirds supermajority, the emir can still suspend that law indefinitely "to serve the higher interests of the country". The Council may also dismiss a minister, but not the prime minister, through a two-thirds vote of no confidence.

For four years after its first and last elections in 2021, it consisted of 45 members, made up of 30 elected representatives and 15 appointees of the Emir, but as of 2024 it has gone back to all 45 members being directly appointed by the emir. Emir Tamim bin Hamad Al Thani stated that "the Shura Council is not a representative parliament in a democratic system, and its status and powers will not be affected whether its members are chosen by election or appointment".

== Authorities and relation to the executive ==
The Shura Council is fully appointed by the emir. It is an advisory legislature, and possesses limited power. It has the authority to approve "general state policies and the budget", but "has no say in the setting of defence, security, economic and investment policy". Its legislation on other matters must be ratified by the emir, and although the Council may overrule that veto with a two-thirds supermajority, the emir can still suspend that law indefinitely "to serve the higher interests of the country". The Council may also dismiss a minister, but not the prime minister, through a two-thirds vote of no confidence.

== History ==
The Council was formed in April 1972 with 20 appointed members. The number of members was increased to 30 in 1975, and again to 41 in 2017. In November 2017, Emir Tamim bin Hamad Al Thani appointed four women to the Council, marking the first time women have been members of it.

In 2003, Qatar's new constitution first mandated that partial elections were to be held for the Shura Council, where 30 of its 45 members would be elected by the public, and 15 would remain appointed by the emir. Elections were first promised for 2005, but were delayed. In 2009, scholar Mehran Kamrava concluded that emir Hamad bin Khalifa's rhetoric on political liberalization was mostly meant to recruit support in the West, and predicted that "for the time being" chances that these elections would actually take place "seem minimal".

=== 2021 election ===
Elections were delayed several more times, until they were finally held in practice in 2021. The disenfranchisement of Qataris whose ancestors were naturalized after 1930 sparked tensions and criticism. Some observers, especially after the abolishment of further elections in 2024, noted that the timing of the election, after many delays, shortly before the 2022 FIFA World Cup, suggested that the election had more to do with Qatar wanting to improve its international image than with genuine political liberalization.

=== 2024 referendum ===
In October 2024, Emir Tamim bin Hamad Al Thani announced a constitutional referendum on proposals to abolish elections to the Shura Council and revert it to a fully appointed body, and said that "the Shura Council is not a representative parliament in a democratic system, and its status and powers will not be affected whether its members are chosen by election or appointment". He also noted that the election had produced conflict among families and tribes.

The referendum was held in November 2024, with the Ministry of Interior saying that 89% of voters backed it, officially abolishing future elections and returning the Council to being fully appointed by the emir.

== Members ==
Speaker

- Hassan bin Abdullah al-Ghanim (elected member)

Deputy speaker

- Hamda bint Hassan al-Sulaiti (appointed member)

Rapporteurs

- Hadi bin Saeed al-Khayarin
- Rashid bin Hamad al-Meadadi

== Speakers ==
Name	Entered office	Left office	Duration	Notes
Abdul Aziz Bin Khalid Al-Ghanim	1 May 1972	8 December 1990	18 years, 7 months and 7 days	
Ali bin Khalifa Al Hitmi	8 December 1990	27 March 1995	4 years, 3 months and 19 days	
Mohamed Bin Mubarak Al-Khulaifi	27 March 1995	14 November 2017	22 years, 7 months and 18 days	
Ahmad bin Abdullah Al Mahmoud	14 November 2017	27 October 2021	3 years, 11 months and 13 days	
Hassan bin Abdulla Al-Ghanim	27 October 2021	Present	5 years and 20 days	

== See also ==
- Politics of Qatar
- List of legislatures by country
