= Geography of Qatar =

- Continent: Asia
- Region: West Asia
- Coordinates: 25.30°N 51.15°E
- Area: Ranked 164th
  - Total: 11,571 km^{2} (4,468 sq mi)
  - Land: 100%
  - Water: 0%
- Coastline: 563 km (350 mi)
- Borders: Saudi Arabia: 60 km (37 mi)
- Highest point: Qurayn Abu al Bawl, 103 m (338 ft)
- Lowest point: Dukhan Sabkha, −7 m (−23 ft)
- Climate: arid; mild, pleasant winters; very hot, humid summers
- Terrain: mostly flat and barren desert covered with loose sand and gravel
- Natural resources: petroleum, natural gas, fish
- Natural hazards: haze, dust storms, sandstorms common
- Environmental issues: limited natural freshwater resources are increasing dependence on large-scale desalination facilities
- Exclusive economic zone: 31,590 km^{2} (12,197 mi^{2})

Qatar is a peninsula in the east of the Arabian Peninsula, bordering the Persian Gulf and Saudi Arabia in a strategic location near major petroleum and natural gas deposits. The State of Qatar occupies 11,571 km^{2} (4,468 sq mi) on a peninsula that extends about 160 km (99 mi) north into the Persian Gulf from the Arabian Peninsula.

Varying in width between 55 and 90 km (34 and 56 mi), the land is mainly flat (the highest point is 103 m (338 ft)) and rocky. Notable features include coastal salt pans, elevated limestone formations (the Dukhan anticline) along the west coast under which lies the Dukhan oil field, and massive sand dunes surrounding Khor Al Adaid, an inlet of the Persian Gulf in the southeast known to local English speakers as the Inland Sea.

== Area and boundaries ==
Qatar has one land border. The country borders Saudi Arabia to the south. The boundary with Saudi Arabia was settled in 1965 but never demarcated. This terrestrial sector extends from the head of the Gulf of Salwah at Abu Samra to Khor Al Adaid, spanning a linear distance of approximately 87 kilometres (54 mi).

Qatar presents as a peninsula encompassed by the tepid waters of the Persian Gulf on its eastern and northern flanks. The western margin is delineated by the Gulf of Salwah, a concave formation which effectively severs Qatar's terrestrial connection with the Al-Ahsa coast and Bahrain.

Qatar's northwest coast is fewer than 30 km (19 mi) from the main islands of Bahrain, while the small Hawar Islands of Bahrain are only 1.9 kilometres (1.2 mi) off the coast. The largest islet of the Hawar Islands is located 5 kilometres (3.1 mi) off Qatari mainland. The peninsula's northernmost point is Ras Rakan.

=== Maritime claims ===
Qatar's maritime boundaries include a contiguous zone of 24 nmi (44.4 km; 27.6 mi), an exclusive economic zone of 31,590 km^{2} (12,197 mi^{2}) as determined by bilateral agreements, and 12 nmi (22.2 km; 13.8 mi) of territorial sea. Maritime boundaries were ratified in April 1992 with Decree No. 40. The exclusive economic zone was declared in 1974.

Situated on the western shore of the Persian Gulf, the Qatari promontory extends longitudinally into the waters, affording it a strategic position for the interception of rain-bearing winds and the regulation of maritime currents in the south-western basin of the Persian Gulf. The extended coastline facilitates the exploitation of pearl banks and piscatorial resources while also providing access to subaqueous petroleum deposits. Aside from hosting large numbers of pearl beds yielding high quality pearls, Qatari waters also host 48% of the coral reefs in the Persian Gulf.

The Qatari coast is further distinguished by its manifold indentations, comprising both convex protrusions of land into the sea, such as Ras Laffan, and concave incursions of water into the terrestrial mass. Moreover, the littoral serves as a natural harbour and transit point for numerous vessels plying the waters of the Persian Gulf.

=== Islands ===
Of the islands belonging to Qatar, Halul is the most important. Lying about 90 km (56 mi) east of Doha, it serves as a storage area and loading terminal for oil from the surrounding offshore fields. Hawar and the adjacent islands immediately off the west coast are the subject of a territorial dispute between Qatar and Bahrain.

== Climate ==
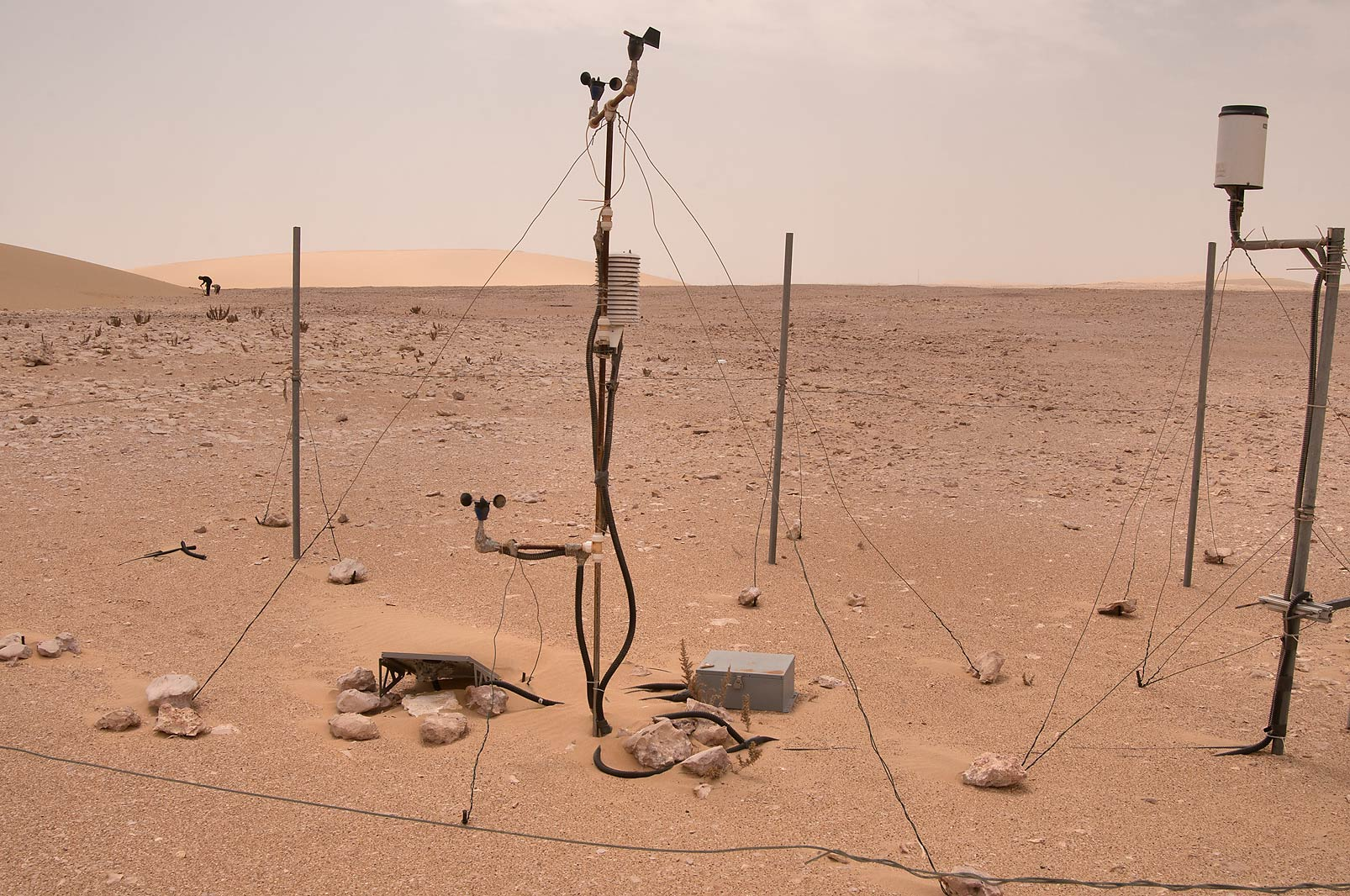
Weather station in Al Kharrara

The long summer (June through September) is characterized by intense heat and alternating dryness and humidity, with temperatures exceeding 40 °C (104 °F). Temperatures are moderate from November to March, ranging from as high as 39 °C (102 °F) in April to as low as 7 °C (45 °F) in January. Rainfall averages 100 mm (3.9 in) per year, confined to the winter months, and falling in brief storms which are occasionally heavy enough to flood the small ravines and the usually dry wadis.

Sudden, violent dust storms occasionally descend on the peninsula, blotting out the sun, causing wind damage, and temporarily disrupting transport and other services.

The scarcity of rainfall and the limited underground water, most of which has such a high mineral content that it is unsuitable for drinking or irrigation, severely restricted the population and the extent of agricultural and industrial development the country could support until desalination projects began. Although water continues to be provided from underground sources, most is obtained by desalination of seawater.

Climate data for Doha (1962–2013, extremes 1962–2013)
Month	Jan	Feb	Mar	Apr	May	Jun	Jul	Aug	Sep	Oct	Nov	Dec	Year
Record high °C (°F)	32.4 (90.3)	36.5 (97.7)	41.5 (106.7)	46.0 (114.8)	47.7 (117.9)	49.1 (120.4)	50.4 (122.7)	48.6 (119.5)	46.2 (115.2)	43.4 (110.1)	38.0 (100.4)	32.7 (90.9)	50.4 (122.7)
Mean daily maximum °C (°F)	22.0 (71.6)	23.4 (74.1)	27.3 (81.1)	32.5 (90.5)	38.8 (101.8)	41.6 (106.9)	41.9 (107.4)	40.9 (105.6)	38.9 (102.0)	35.4 (95.7)	29.6 (85.3)	24.4 (75.9)	33.1 (91.5)
Daily mean °C (°F)	17.8 (64.0)	18.9 (66.0)	22.3 (72.1)	27.1 (80.8)	32.5 (90.5)	35.1 (95.2)	36.1 (97.0)	35.5 (95.9)	33.3 (91.9)	30.0 (86.0)	25.0 (77.0)	20.0 (68.0)	27.8 (82.0)
Mean daily minimum °C (°F)	13.5 (56.3)	14.4 (57.9)	17.3 (63.1)	21.4 (70.5)	26.1 (79.0)	28.5 (83.3)	30.2 (86.4)	30.0 (86.0)	27.7 (81.9)	24.6 (76.3)	20.4 (68.7)	15.6 (60.1)	22.5 (72.5)
Record low °C (°F)	3.8 (38.8)	1.5 (34.7)	8.2 (46.8)	10.5 (50.9)	15.2 (59.4)	21.0 (69.8)	23.5 (74.3)	22.4 (72.3)	20.3 (68.5)	16.6 (61.9)	11.8 (53.2)	6.4 (43.5)	1.5 (34.7)
Average precipitation mm (inches)	13.2 (0.52)	17.1 (0.67)	16.1 (0.63)	8.7 (0.34)	3.6 (0.14)	0.0 (0.0)	0.0 (0.0)	0.0 (0.0)	0.0 (0.0)	1.1 (0.04)	3.3 (0.13)	12.1 (0.48)	75.2 (2.95)
Average precipitation days (≥ 1.0 mm)	1.7	2.1	1.8	1.4	0.2	0.0	0.0	0.0	0.0	0.1	0.2	1.3	8.8
Average relative humidity (%)	74	70	63	53	44	41	50	58	62	63	66	74	60
Mean monthly sunshine hours	244.9	224.0	241.8	273.0	325.5	342.0	325.5	328.6	306.0	303.8	276.0	241.8	3,432.9
Mean daily sunshine hours	7.9	8.0	7.8	9.1	10.5	11.4	10.5	10.6	10.2	9.8	9.2	7.8	9.4
Source 1: NOAA
Source 2: Qatar Meteorological Department (Climate Normals 1962–2013)

Sea Climate Data For Doha
Month	Jan	Feb	Mar	Apr	May	Jun	Jul	Aug	Sep	Oct	Nov	Dec	Year
Average sea temperature °C (°F)	21.0 (69.8)	19.4 (66.9)	20.9 (69.6)	23.3 (73.9)	27.8 (82)	30.5 (86.9)	32.4 (90.3)	33.6 (92.5)	32.8 (91)	30.8 (87.4)	27.5 (81.5)	23.5 (74.3)	26.9 (80.5)

== Topography and natural regions ==
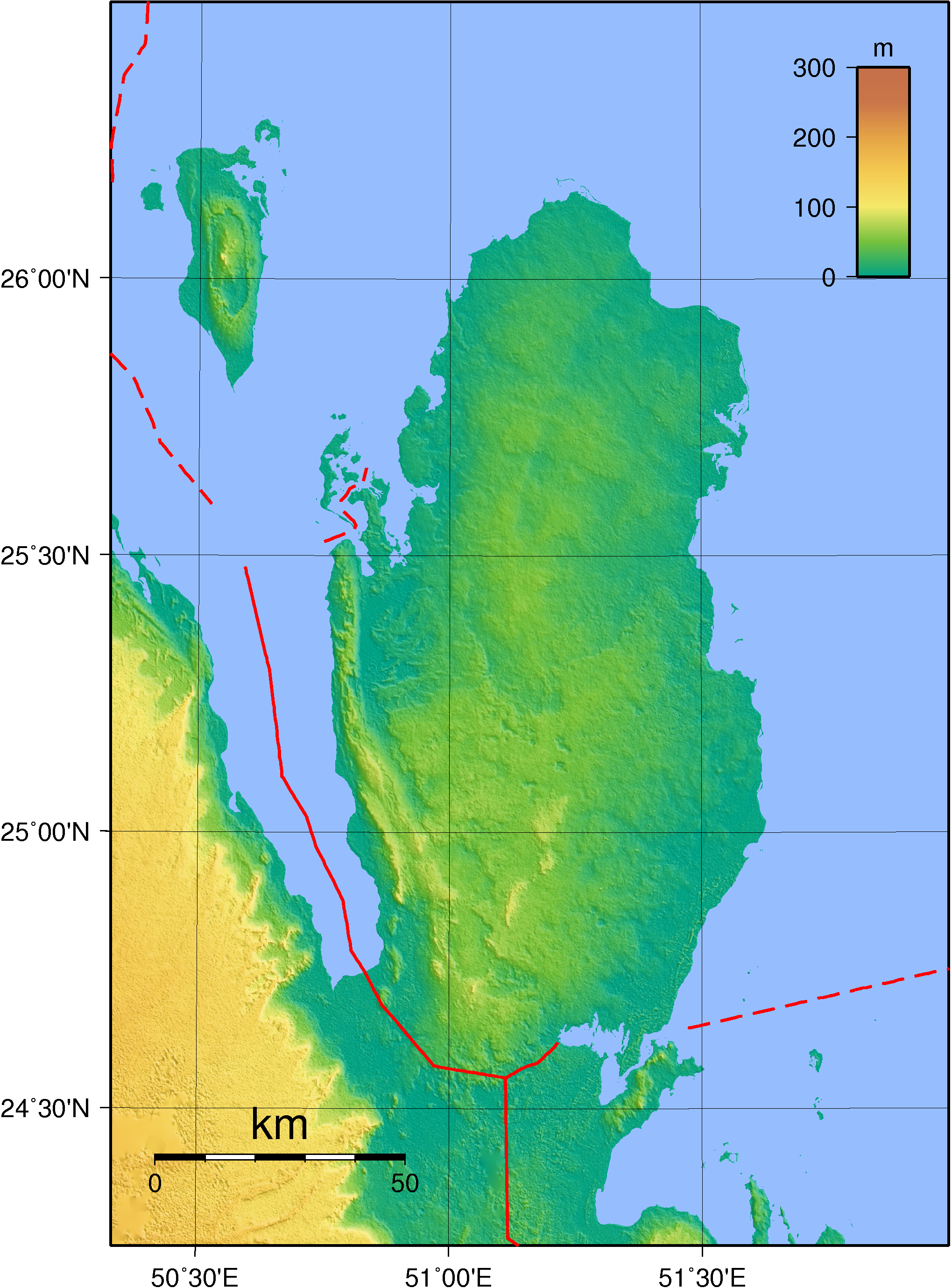
Topographic map showing pre-1974 borders with the United Arab Emirates bordering Qatar.

The peninsula of Qatar is low-lying. Its shape is the surface expression of the anticlinal Qatar Arch, formed during the Precambrian Amar Collision about 640 to 620 million years ago. It is enveloped by loose sand and pebbles broken off the outcropping limestone. Smooth plains covered by fine-grained dust are found in the east, while the south and south-west portions of the peninsula mainly comprise sand dunes and salt flats (locally known as sabkhas), particularly near Mesaieed and Khor Al Adaid. Sakbahs can also be found in western Qatar, near Dukhan and Sawda Natheel. Hill ranges (jebels) can be found in western Qatar near Dukhan and at Jebel Fuwayrit on the northeast coast. For purposes of categorization, the country is divided into five principal regions: coastal plain, interior plain, central belt, Dukhan region, and southern desert.

=== Coastal plain ===
The littoral of Qatar, extending some 650 kilometres (400 mi) from Abu Samra to Khor Al Adaid via Ar Ru'ays, is emergent and characterized by recent geological formations. The western coast from Abu Samra to Ras Dukhan is relatively straight, while northward to Ar Ru'ays is indented with circular and oblong water incursions. The eastern coast is broader, with elevations increasing eastward from Dohah Al Husain. Many flat, low-lying offshore islands are located near the coast and are accompanied by coral reefs. As a result of salt water coming into contact with the low-lying land, many salt flats (known locally as sabkhas) have formed near the coast.

=== Interior plain ===
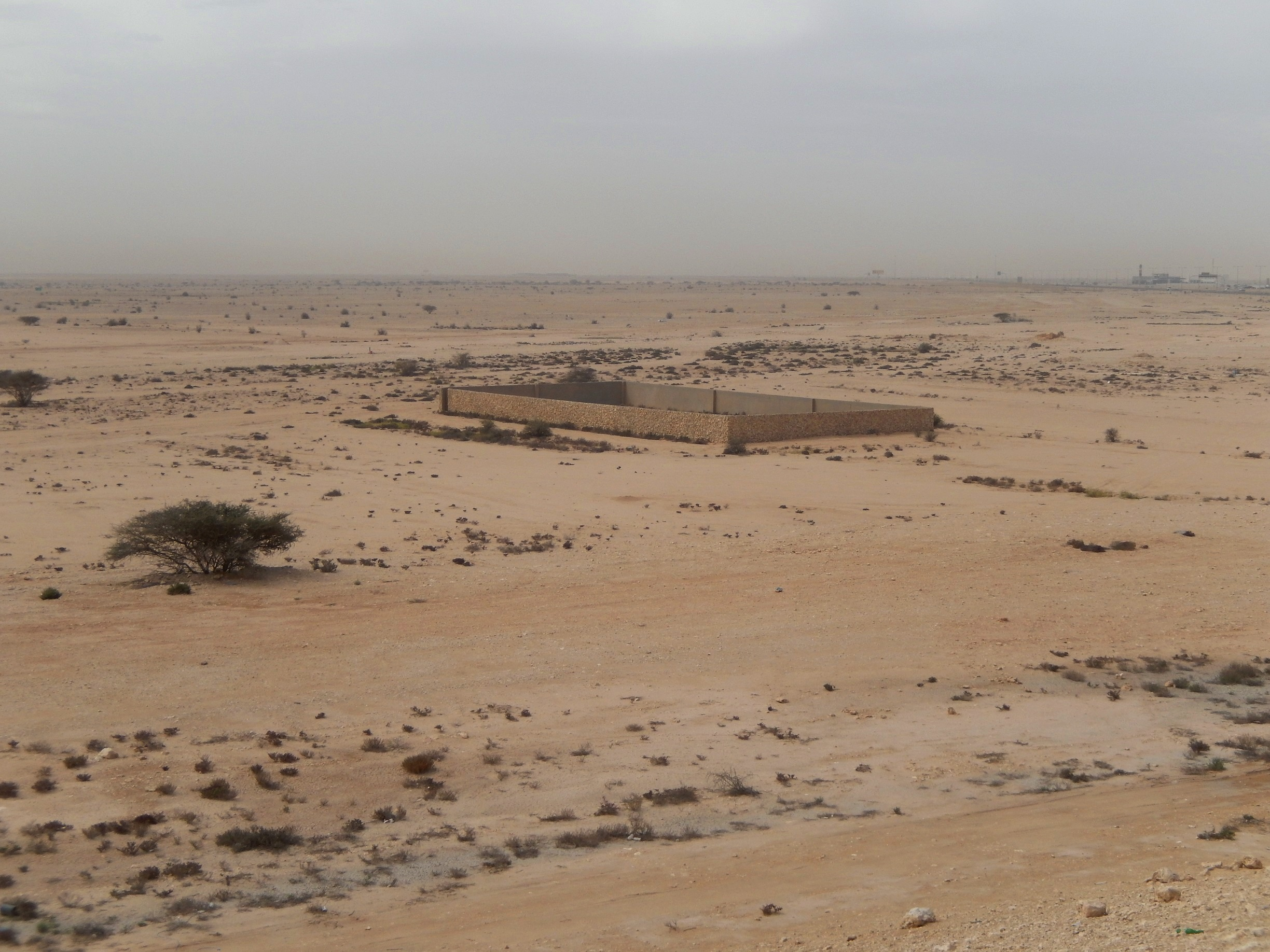
Desert of Simaisma, located in the southern section of the interior plain region

Commencing at the inland margins of the coastal strip, this region is demarcated in the north by the Al Mafjar-Abu Dhalouf line. It broadens considerably southward, with its northern sector spanning 18.5 kilometres (11.5 mi) between Al-ʽAdhbah and Ar Rakiyat, while its southern base between Umm Al Qahab and Al Suwaihliya measures 46.5 kilometres (28.9 mi). The surface is studded with eleven closed basins. The northern sector is relatively flat, while the central sector, between Fuwayrit and Rawdat Al Faras, exhibits more complex topography with elevations ranging from 11 metres (36 ft) to 21 metres (69 ft).

=== Central belt ===
This zone aligns with Qatar's primary north-south oriented dome. It is distinguished by its topographical diversity, with elevations ranging from 31 metres (102 ft) to 49 metres (161 ft) above sea level. The surface is uneven, with circular or rectangular hills along the western borders reaching heights of 41 metres (135 ft) to 49 metres (161 ft). Fourteen closed basins are scattered throughout, smaller in the east within the Rus Formation and larger in the west within the Dammam Formation. The highest points are found in the hills southeast of Al Jemailiya and to the west of the Al Jemailiya-Ash-Shahaniyah road.

=== Dukhan region ===
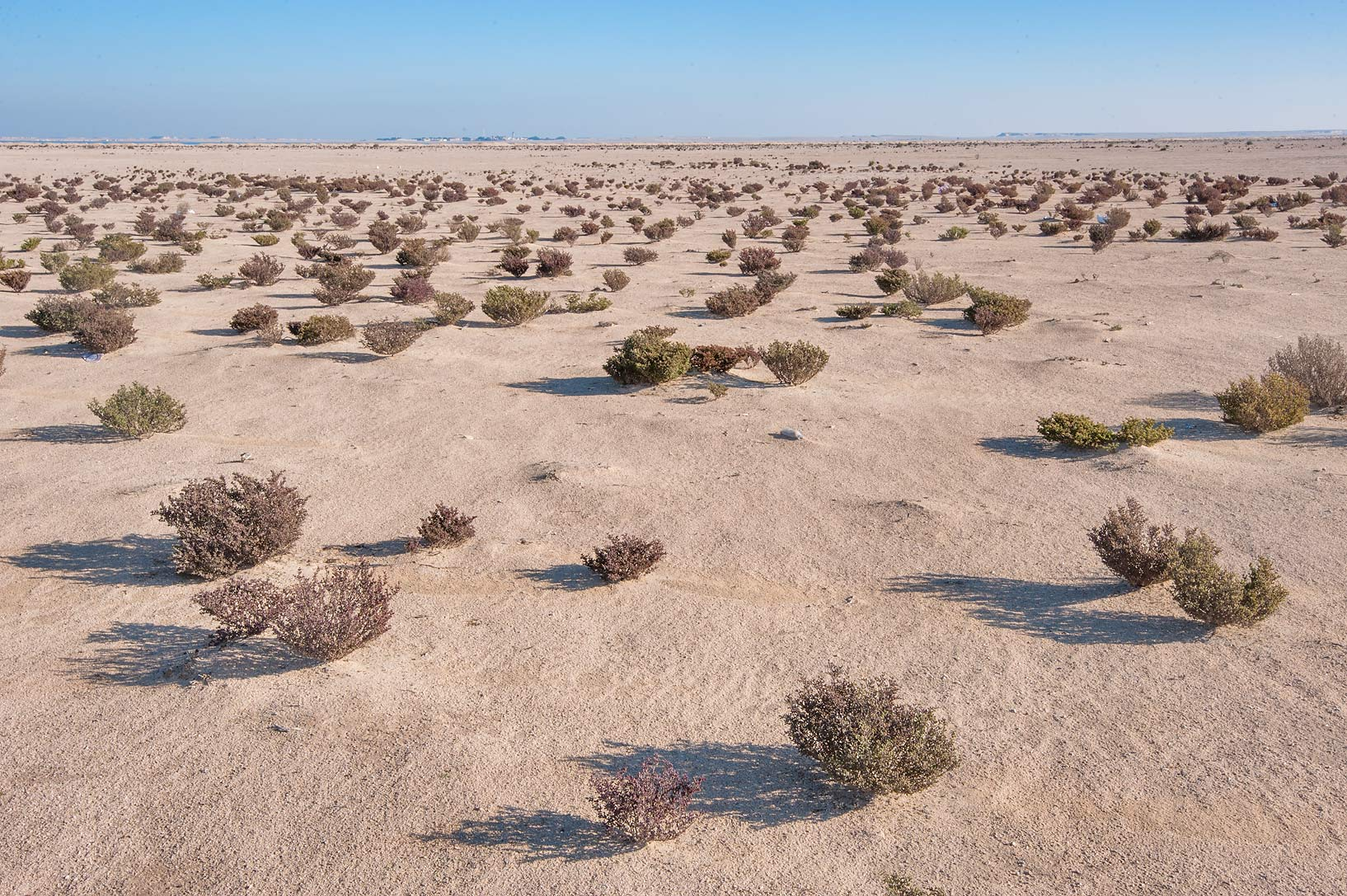
Landscape near the Dukhan Sabkha

Occupying the greater part of Qatar's western flank, this area extends 87 kilometres (54 mi) from Ras Abrouq in the north to An Nakhsh in the south. It is characterized by complex structural units, with elevations reaching 92 metres (302 ft) at Khashm An-Nakhsh and depressions as low as −5 metres (−16 ft) below sea level in the Dukhan Sabkha. This sabkha, the largest inland salt flat in the Persian Gulf, runs for approximately 20 kilometres (12 mi), occupies an area of 73 km^{2} (28 sq mi), and accommodates the lowest point of Qatar at −6 metres (−20 ft) below sea level. Jebel Nakhsh, a notable mountain ridge south of Dukhan, contains substantial deposits of gypsum.

=== Southern desert ===
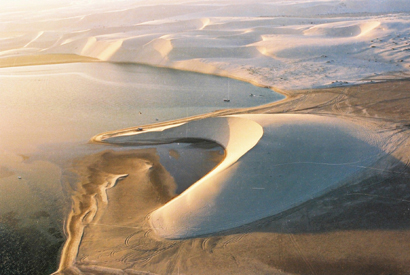
Sand dunes at Khor Al Adaid

This region occupies 34.7% of Qatar's total area, south of Doha's latitude. It bears topographical similitude to the desert areas of Abu Dhabi, Saudi Arabia, and Bahrain, with undulating sand dunes interspersed with rocky hamada surfaces. It is divided into four sub-regions:

1. Al Urayq: A triangular area in the extreme west, with its apex at Abu Samra. Its northern side aligns with the southern extremity of the Doha-Abu Samra road, and its southern side follows the border line from Abu Samra towards the southeast.
2. Miocene-Tiwar: Characterized by isolated hills amidst a rocky plain. The hills reach a maximum of 103 metres (338 ft) and include Qatar's highest point, Qurayn Abu al Bawl. This sub-region is concentrated in the southwestern part of the Qatar Peninsula, including areas like Mukaynis, Al Kharrara, and Wadi Jallal.
3. Rocky surfaces: Consisting of expanses of exposed bedrock, often weathered into flat, stony plains known as desert pavements. The surface may be covered by a mosaic of closely packed pebbles and rock fragments, or in some places by a thin layer of indurated mineral deposits forming a hard crust. This sub-region is divided into two units: one shaped like a trapezoid bounded by the water pipeline passing through Abu Nakhla to Mesaieed, and another extending from Umm Jawlaq southeastward through Al Khubayb, Al Fulayhah, and Umm Al Hayran to Khor Al Adaid.
4. Sand dunes: Occupying 1.6% of Qatar's area, with dunes reaching heights of 38 metres (125 ft) to 67 metres (220 ft). Interspersed among the dunes are numerous closed basins with floors varying in elevation from 19 metres (62 ft) to 34 metres (112 ft) metres above sea level, resulting in an undulating topography. The northern boundary of this sub-region aligns with the latitude of Umm Owaina.

== Landforms ==
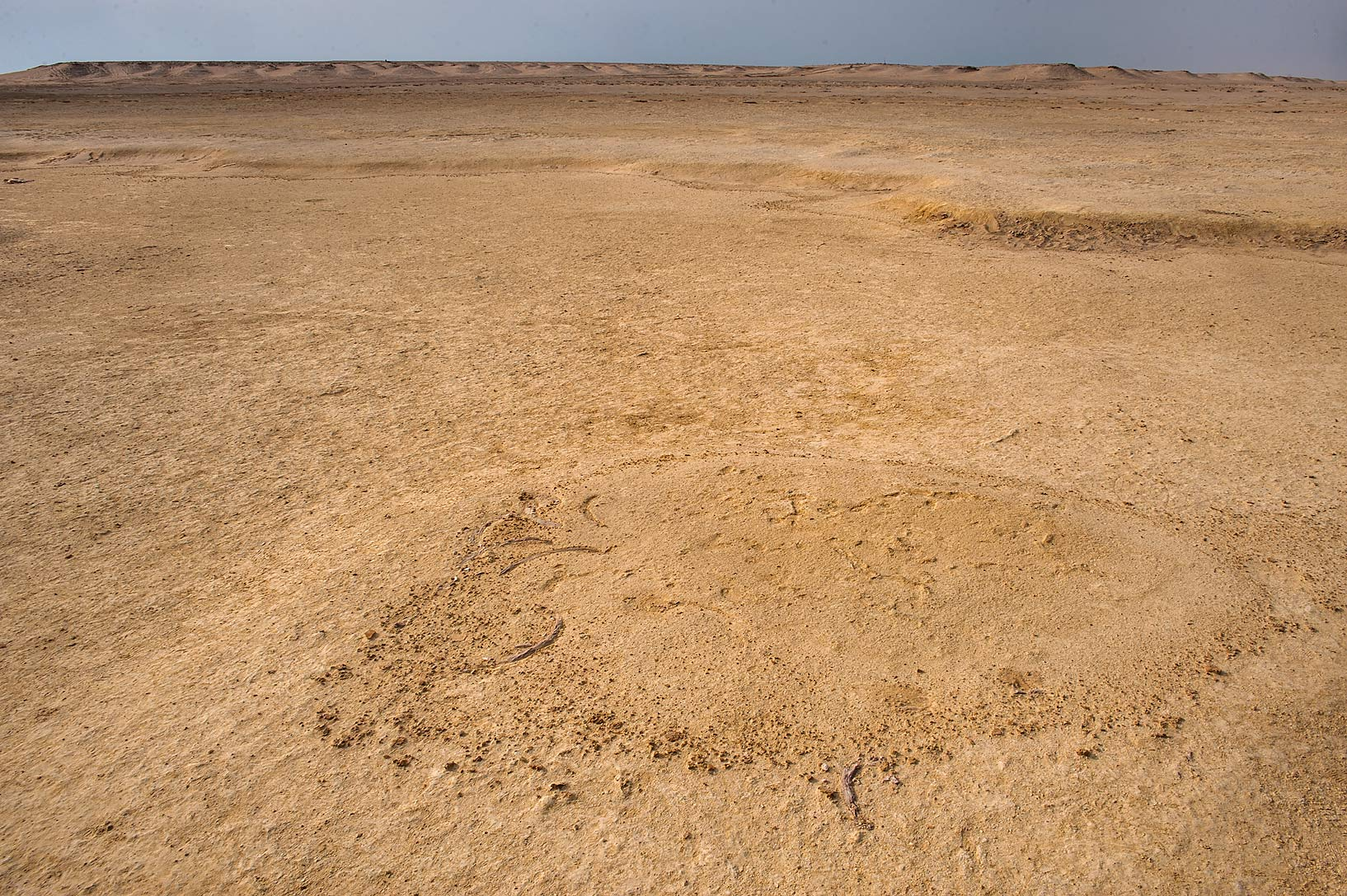
Coastal sabkha in southwest Qatar

=== Sabkhas ===
The peninsula is notable for its sabkhas, or salt flats, of which the two distinct varieties are coastal and inland. The coastal sabkhas, more prevalent on the eastern seaboard, encompass an area of approximately 75 km^{2} (29 sq mi). These coastal formations rarely exceed an elevation of 1 metre (3 ft 3 in) to 2 metres (6 ft 7 in) metres above sea level, with some portions lying below the waterline. Consequently, during exceptionally high tides, often exacerbated by strong easterly winds, seawater may inundate these low-lying areas.

Inland sabkhas, while less common, are of significant geological interest. A prominent example, Dukhan Sabkha, lies 3 kilometres east of Jebel Dukhan and south of the Bay of Zekreet. This depression, covering 73 km^{2} (28 sq mi), is largely situated below sea level and contains the lowest point in Qatar at −6 metres (−20 ft) below the sea's surface. It stretches 24 kilometres from north to south and 6 kilometres (3.7 mi) from east to west. A second notable inland sabkha complex straddles the borders of Qatar, Saudi Arabia, and the United Arab Emirates. This formation comprises three discrete areas: Sawda Natheel to the south, Jawa Salama to the west, and Al Khufus to the east. These sabkhas, mostly subsea in elevation, collectively span an area of 25 km^{2} (9.7 sq mi).

=== Depressions ===
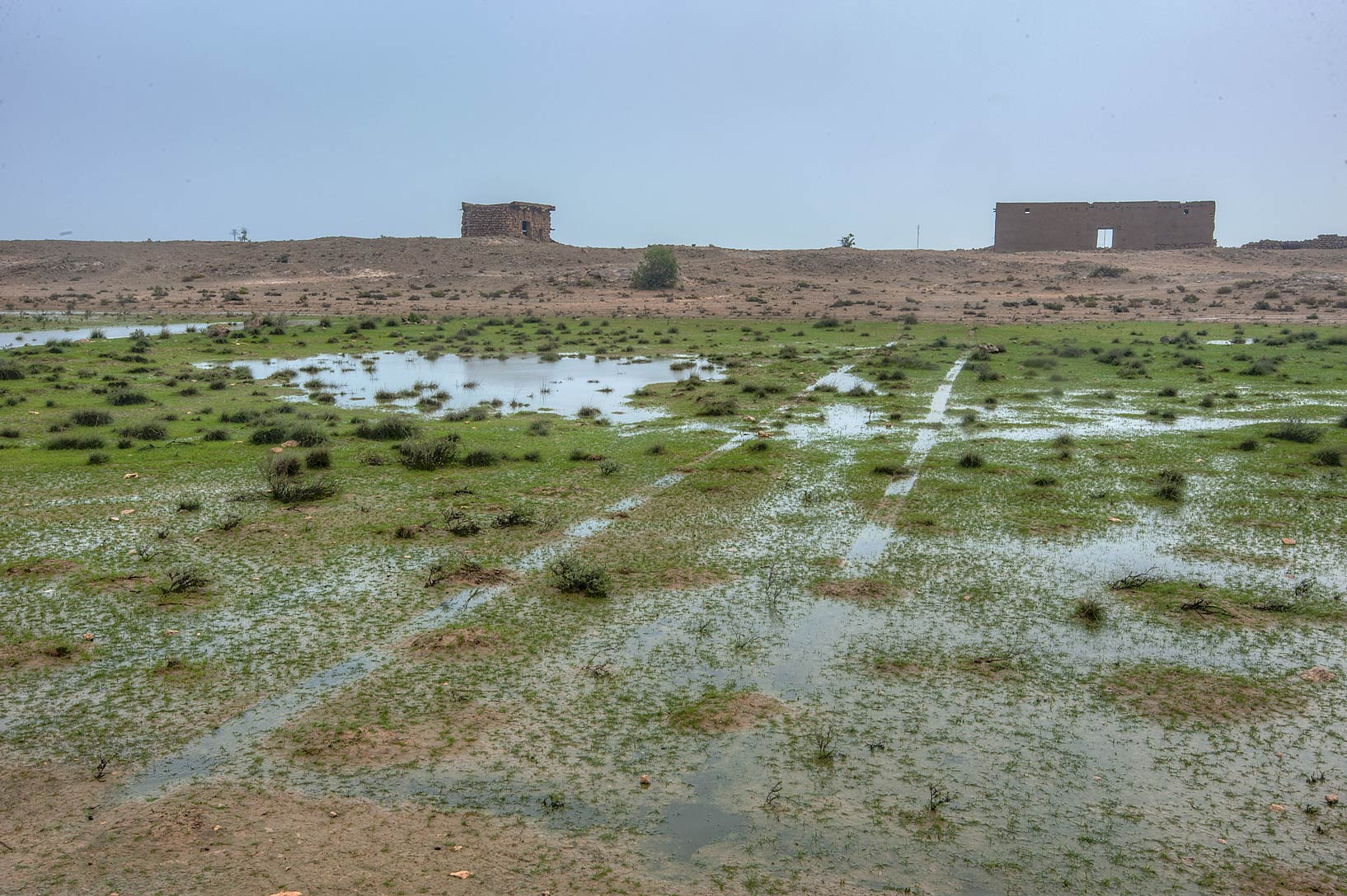
A rawda near Jebel Jassasiya in northern Qatar

The surface of the Qatar Peninsula is punctuated by numerous small depressions, referred to as rawda or the plural riyadh. These formations present as enclosed basins, save for those in the south-central region which may be open on one or more sides. The morphology of these depressions is diverse, ranging from circular to elongated forms, with some exhibiting irregular platforms. The scale of these depressions also varies widely. The most extensive, such as the Almajdah Depression, stretch for several kilometres, while the smallest span mere tens of metres. Their formation is primarily attributed to the dissolution of surface limestone by rainwater runoff, a process that has been active across much of the peninsula.

=== Dahls (Caverns) ===
Dahl is a local term used to describe a once sealed cave which had its roof collapse. Before roof collapse locals usually call it Kharsa'a (Arabic: خرسعة).

Due to the formation being roof collapse, some translate the term "dahl" to "sinkhole," although "cavern" is more commonly used. Dahls are common due to the underling limestone bedrock, which exhibits the same chemical dissolution as Karst. Locals formerly believed dahls were due to meteorites falling.

Dahls include Dahl Al Hamam, Dahl Al Misfer, Dahl Al Mudhlem. Dalh Al Hamam is the only cenote in the country.

=== Valleys ===
Dry valleys, known as wadis, are featured most prominently in Qatar's northern region and the vicinity of Jebel Dukhan. They are characterised by their internal drainage systems, which terminate in shallow depressions rarely exceeding 2 to 3 metres in depth. While they may extend for several kilometres in length, they maintain a remarkably narrow profile, with a width invariably less than 100 metres.

=== Hills ===
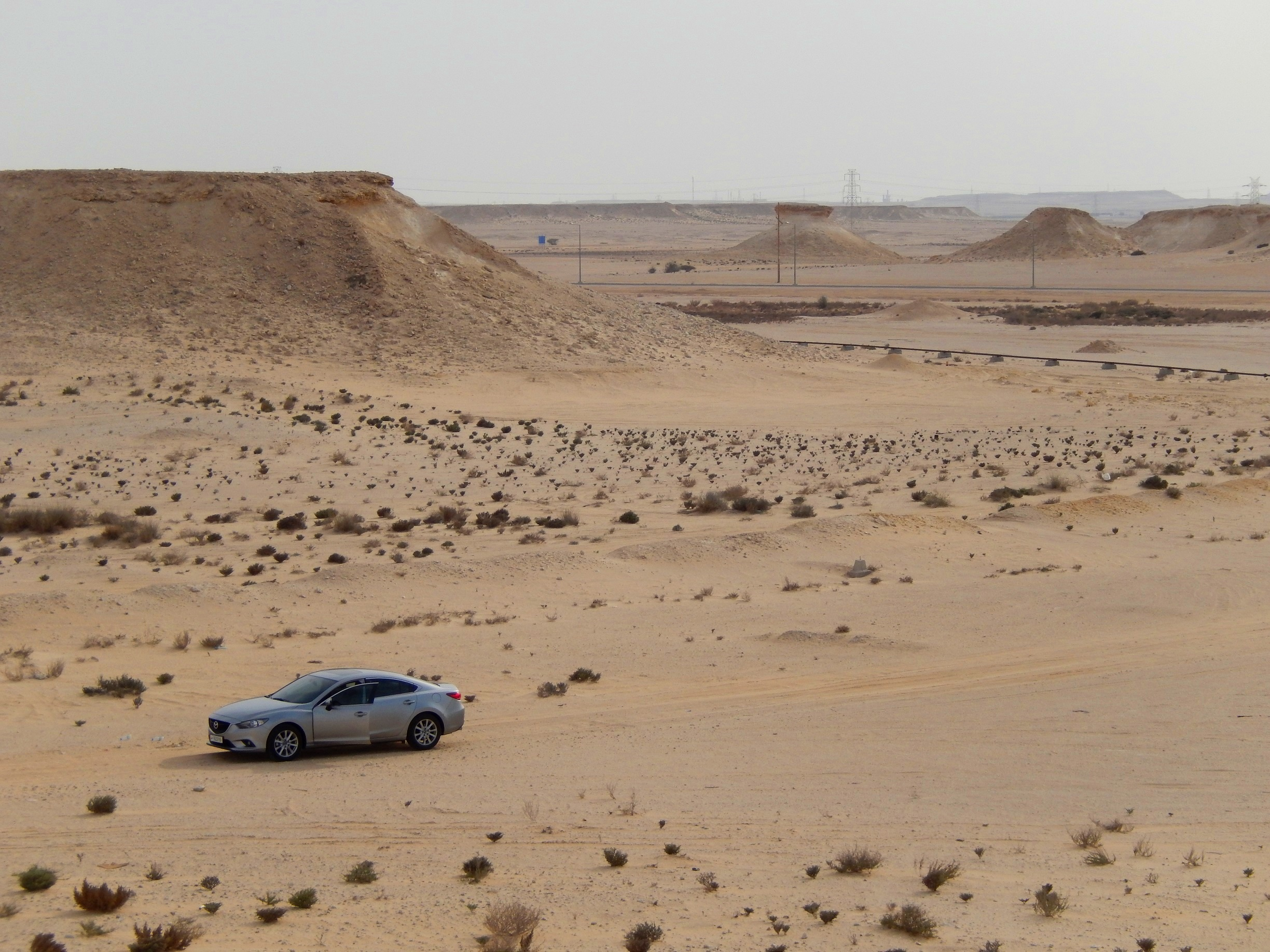
Flat-topped hills in the Zekreet Peninsula

The peninsula features several low hills scattered throughout its western and southern regions. Notable among these is Jebel Dukhan, a series of convex hillocks extending 80 kilometres (50 mi) north-south along the west coast. The peninsula's terrain also features distinctive flat-topped hills, formed by horizontal strata capped with relatively hard rock. These formations exhibit steep, often concave or stepped slopes, shaped by varying degrees of rock resistance.

Topographical features range from small, conical hills—where the resistant rock cap has eroded—to more extensive mesa-like formations. Elevation varies considerably; in the Zekreet Peninsula and near Al Khor, the hills are 10 metres (33 ft) to 15 metres (49 ft) above sea level. The southern hills are much taller, with Qatar's highest point, Qurayn Abu al Bawl (also known as Tuwayyir Al Hamir) being over 100 metres (330 ft) above sea level.

== Wildlife ==
=== Flora ===
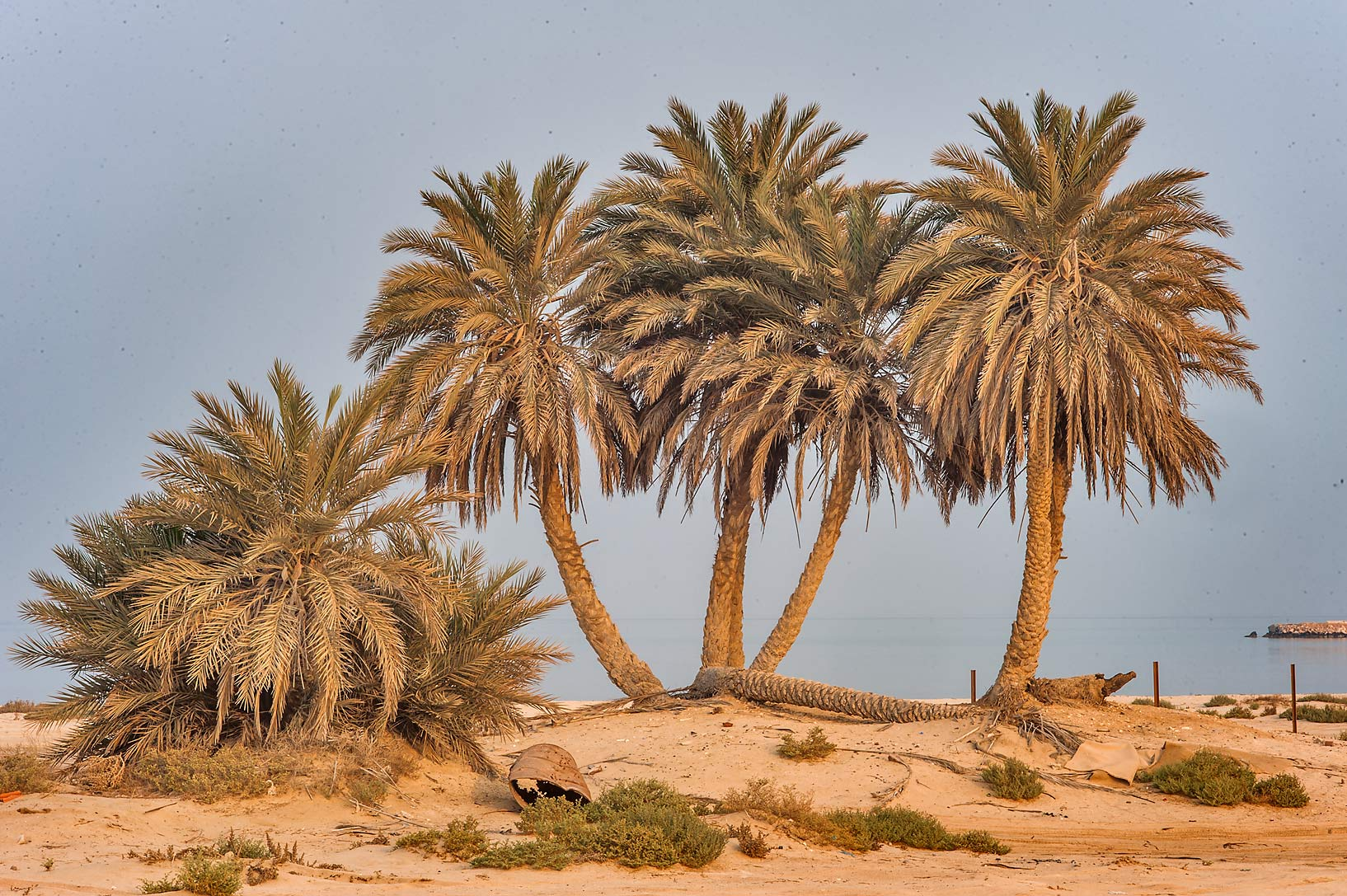
Wild date palms growing near Umm Bab in western Qatar

Although most of the country consists of sand deserts, a small part of the country houses different vegetation zones, where trees, reeds and shrubs like tamarind, phragmites, and mace can grow. These regions are mostly to the east, near the coast. The inherent limiting factor for vegetation growth is water availability. Certain geographical features partially alleviate this water scarcity, such as rawdas, which are large depressions found on the soil surface and which help recharge the aquifers. As these sites constitute the most easily obtainable sources of shallow groundwater, they are also among the areas most abundant in wild vegetation.

In the south, where groundwater is exceedingly scarce, vegetation can found growing in wadis (dry river valleys) fed by run-off from nearby hills and in rawdas. Sabkhas are another habitat known to contain various plant species. Vegetation in sabkhas is closely tied to soil salinity and moisture availability. Inland sabkhas are typically sparsely vegetated due to extreme salinity and aridity. Species that persist under these conditions include Zygophyllum qatarense, Anabasis setifera, which occurs along sabkha margins, and the halophytic grass Aeluropus lagopoides. By contrast, coastal sabkhas situated beyond mangrove zones are more frequently vegetated, often supporting dense stands of salt-tolerant flora. Typical genera include Arthrocnemum, Halocnemum, Halopeplis, and Limonium. Halopeplis and Limonium are commonly found on slightly raised, drier saline land, whereas Arthrocnemum and Halocnemum are more abundant in low-lying, moisture-retaining areas.

=== Fauna ===
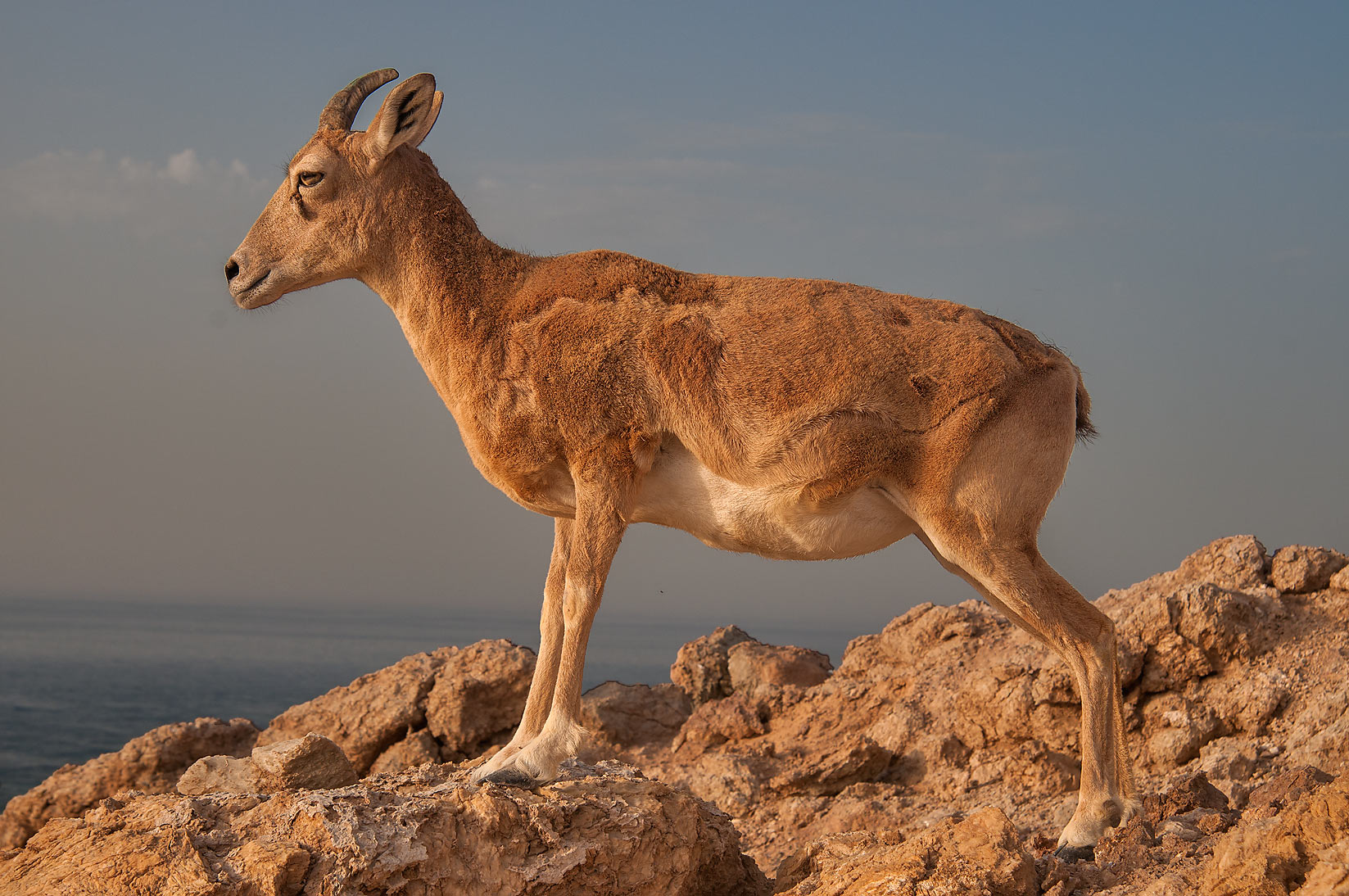
A mountain goat at Halul Island

There are 21 species of mammals that have been recorded in Qatar. Larger terrestrial mammals such as the Arabian oryx and Arabian gazelle are protected animals and are held in nature reserves. The Arabian gazelle is the only native gazelle species to Qatar and is locally referred to as 'rheem'.

Qatar's territorial waters in the Persian Gulf are rich in marine life. Sea turtles nest en masse on the coastline from Fuwayrit to Ras Laffan. The Ministry of Environment (MME) carries out routine patrols of nesting areas to ensure their conservation. Dugongs are known to congregate off the country's coasts. In the course of a study being carried out in 1986 and 1999 on the Persian Gulf, the largest-ever group sightings were made of more than 600 individuals to the west of Qatar.

== Geology and mineral deposits ==
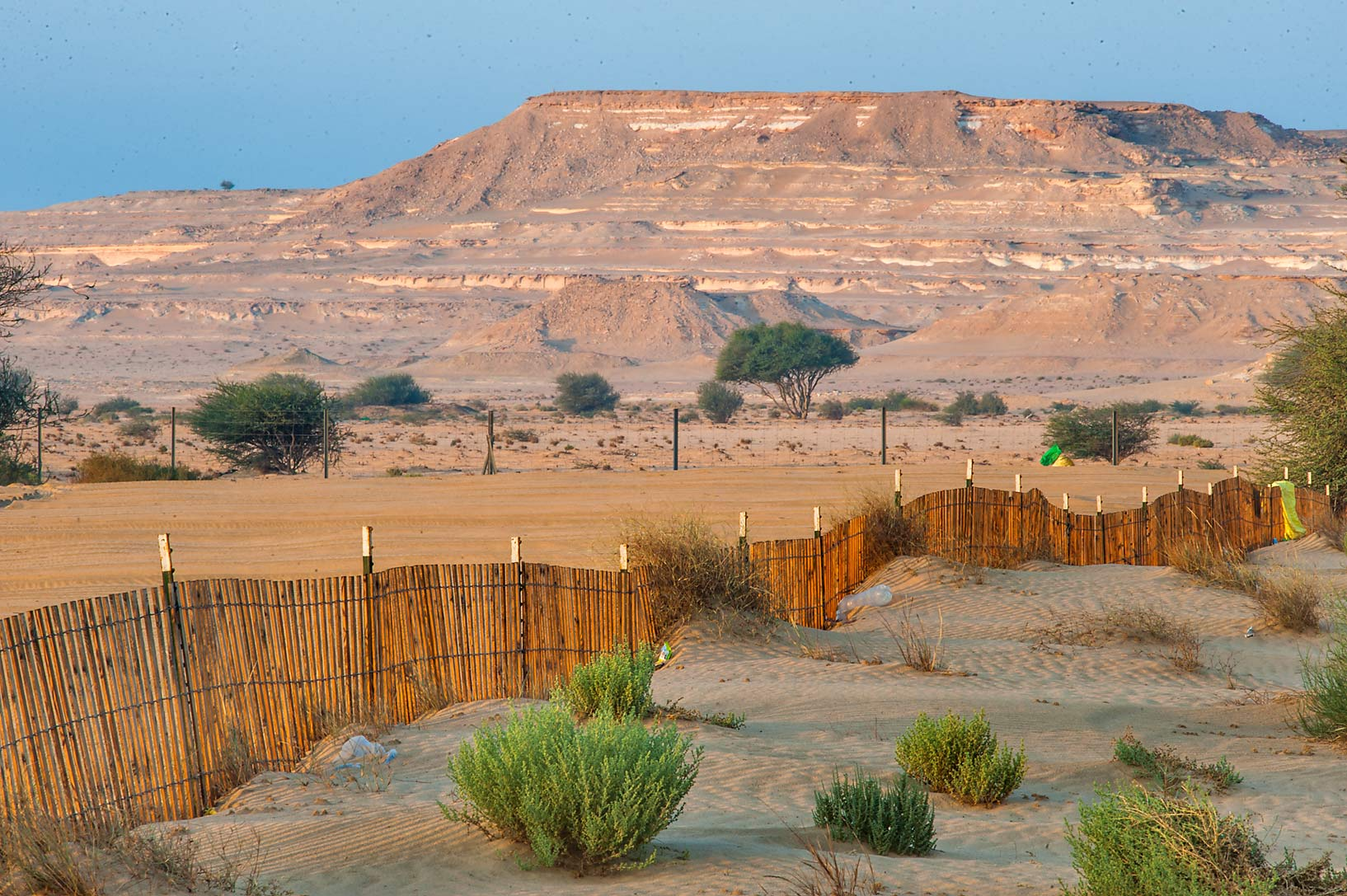
Fenced-off area of Jebel Nakhsh (Nakhsh Mountain)

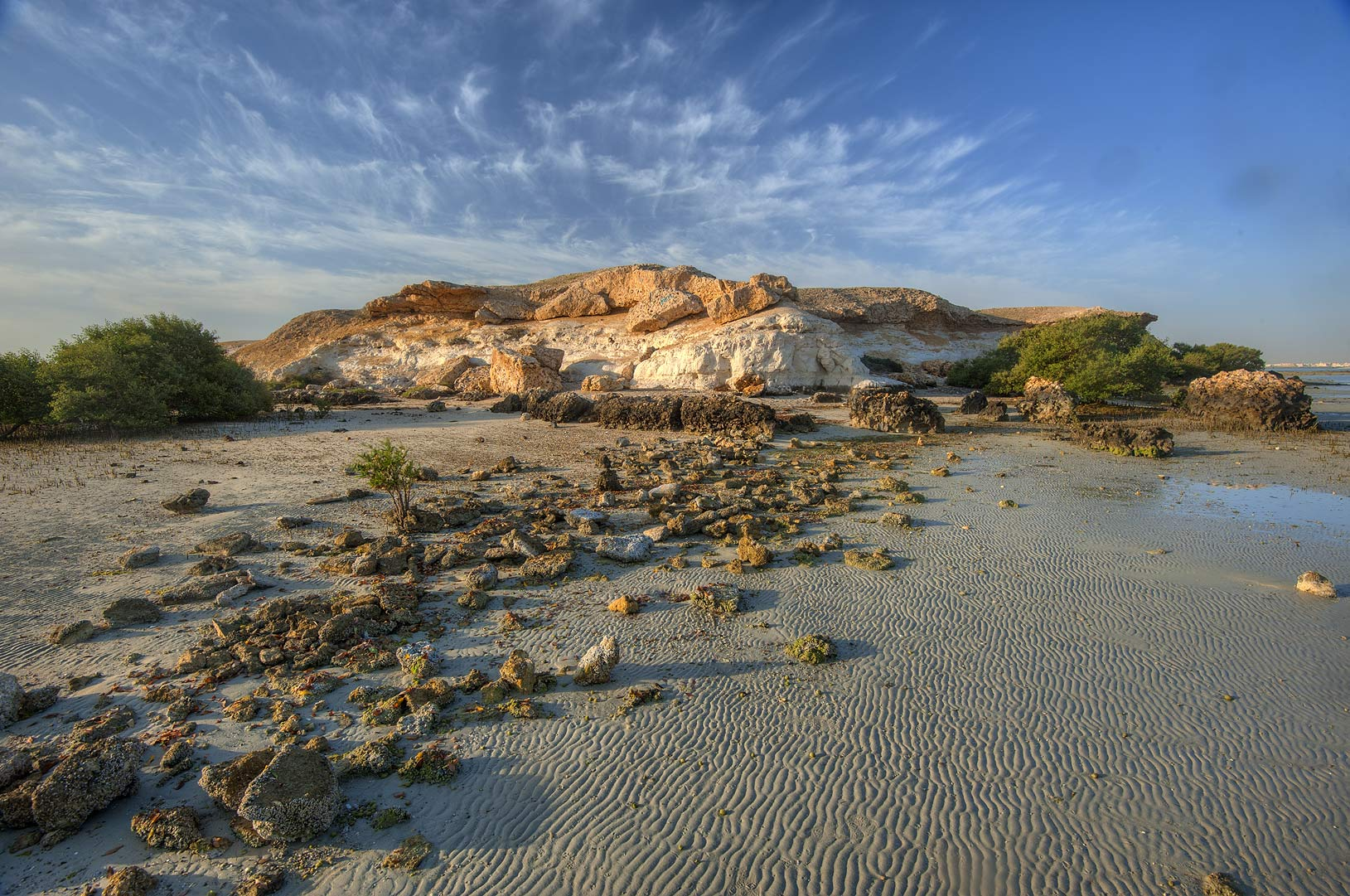
Limestone hillock on northern end of Al Khor Island

Era	Period	Formation	Member	Mineral deposits and resources
Paleozoic	Cambrian	Hormuz Formation	Dolomite, sandstone	Hematite, carbonates, asbestos
Paleozoic	Permian; Carboniferous	Khuff Formation		Petroleum
Mesozoic	Jurassic	Uwainat Limestone Formation, Arab Formation	Dolomite, limestone, evaporite, shale	Petroleum
Mesozoic	Cretaceous	Shuaiba Formation	Marlstone, limestone, shale	Petroleum
Cenozoic	Paleocene	Umm Er Radhuma Formation		
Cenozoic	Lower Eocene	Rus Formation	Chalk	Celestine, gypsum
Cenozoic	Lower Eocene	Lower Dammam Formation	Dukhan limestone, Midra shale, Rudjm Aid limestone	Palygorskite, pyrite
Cenozoic	Middle Eocene	Upper Dammam Formation	Umm Bab chalk, Simaisma dolomites	Dolomite, limestone
Cenozoic	Miocene	Upper and Lower Dam Formation	Clay, limestone, gypsum	Clay, limestone, celestine
Cenozoic	Pliocene	Hofuf Formation	Sandy clay, sandstone	Sand, gravel
Cenozoic	Pleistocene		Miliolite limestone	Limestone

Most of Qatar's surface lies on Cenozoic strata. These strata have an abundance of mineral resources, most of which have not yet been exploited, such as limestone and clay. The Upper Dammam Formation in the Middle Eocene period is the most predominant surface layer. It is constituted by limestone and Dolomite. The northern zone of Qatar, which comprises the most significant source of fresh groundwater in the peninsula, primarily draws its water from the Umm Err Radhuma Formation and Rus Formation dating to the Paleocene and Lower Eocene periods, respectively. The Mesozoic strata are the most important layers as they contain petroleum. The first substantial deposit of crude oil was discovered in 1940 in the Jurassic period Arab Formation.

== Resources and land use ==
Qatar is the fifth most water stressed country in the world.

Based on 2011 estimates, 5.6% of the land is agricultural. Arable land comprises 1.1%, permanent crops 0.2% and permanent pasture 4.6%. 94.4% of the land was used for other uses. In 2003, 129.4 km^{2} (50.0 sq mi) of land was irrigated.

Severe conditions, such as extremely high temperatures and lack of water and fertile soil, hinder increased agricultural production. Orthents, the predominant soil type in the peninsula, accounting for approximately 1,020,000 ha (3,900 mi^{2}), are unfavorable for crop cultivation because of their extreme shallowness. The limited groundwater that permits agriculture in some areas is being depleted so rapidly that saltwater is encroaching and making the soil inhospitable to all but the most salt-resistant crops.

== Political and human geography ==
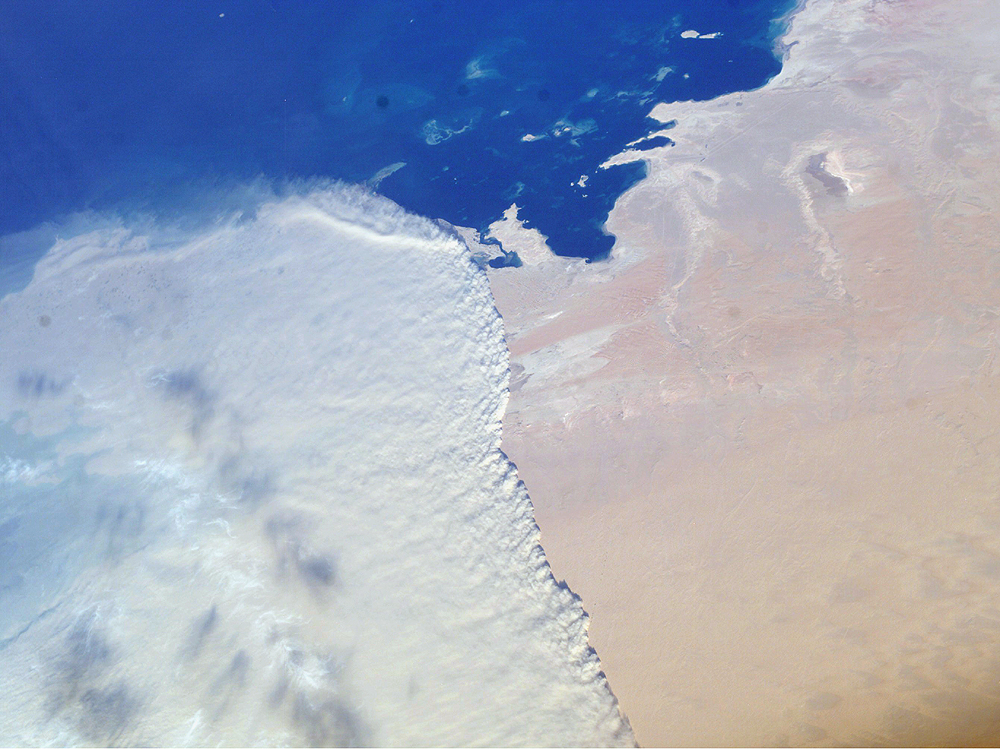
A massive sandstorm sweeping over the Persian Gulf state of Qatar as it races southward toward southeastern Saudi Arabia and the United Arab Emirates on February 15, 2004

The capital, Doha, is located on the central east coast on a sweeping (if shallow) harbor. Other ports include Umm Said, Al Khawr, and Al Wakrah. Only Doha and Umm Said are capable of handling commercial shipping, although a large port and a terminal for loading natural gas are planned at Ras Laffan Industrial City, north of Al Khawr. Coral reefs and shallow coastal waters make navigation difficult in areas where channels have not been dredged.

Doha is the capital of the country and the major administrative, commercial, and population center. In 1993 it was linked to other towns and development sites by a system of about 1,000 km (620 mi) of paved roads. Doha's international airport has an approximately 4,500 m (14,800 ft) main runway, capable of receiving all kinds of aircraft.

Historically, settlement distribution in Qatar has mainly been dictated by the presence of obtainable fresh groundwater. Rawdas, which are depressions with shallow groundwater, have typically been the most popular sites of settlement throughout the peninsula. In Qatar's south, where groundwater is exceedingly difficult to obtain, settlement formation was mostly limited to wadis (dry river valleys) fed by run-off from nearby hills and rawdas.

== Environmental agreements ==
Qatar is currently party to the following international environmental agreements:

- Biodiversity
- Climate Change
- Desertification
- Hazardous Wastes
- Law of the Sea
- Ozone Layer Protection

== Bibliography ==
- Casey, Paula; Vine, Peter (1991). The heritage of Qatar (print ed.). Immel Publishing. ISBN 978-0-907151-50-0.
