= Zekreet =

Zekreet زكريت
- Village
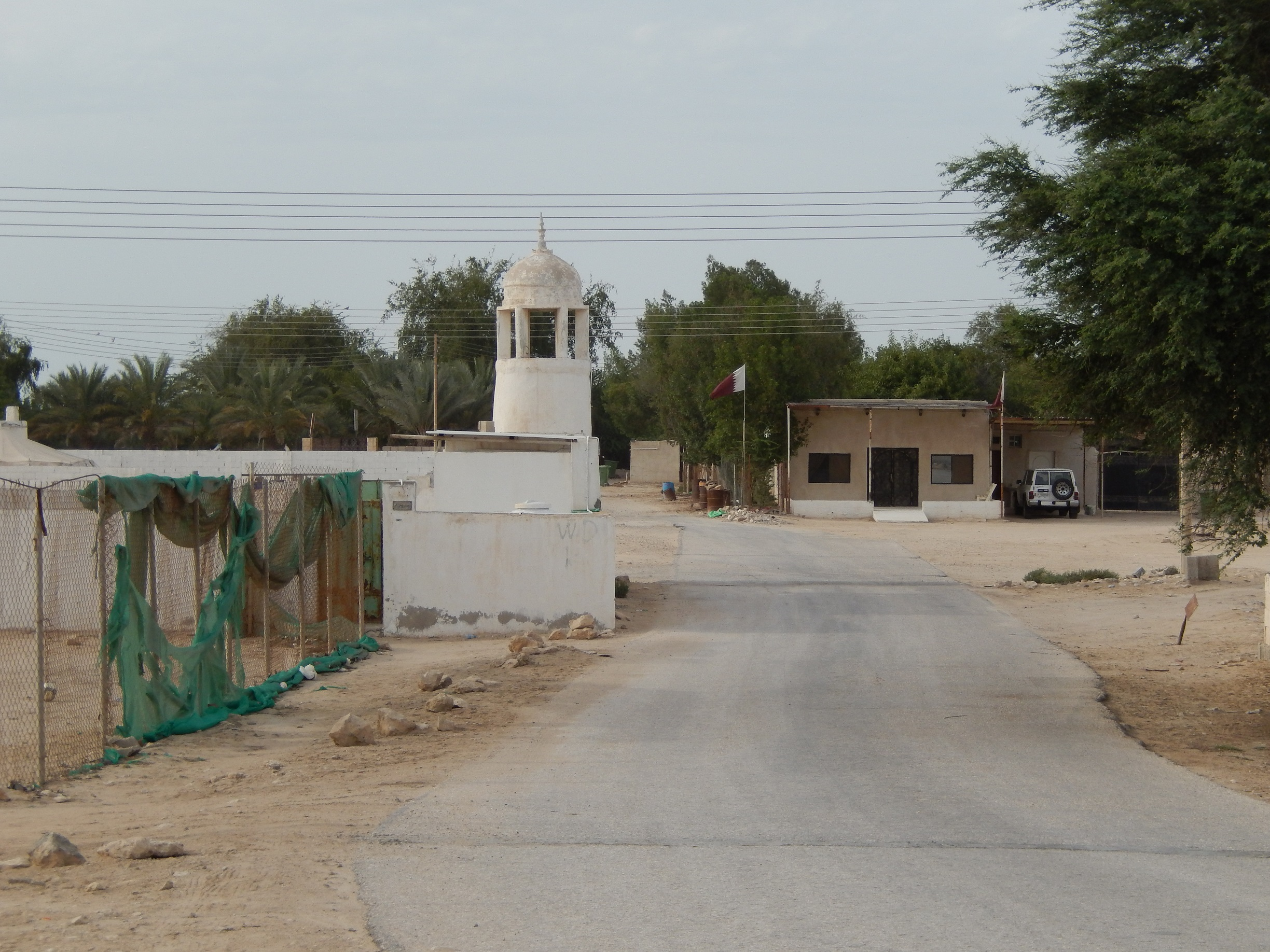
- View of the village in 2015

- Location in Qatar
- Coordinates: 25°31′22″N 50°49′41″E
- Country: Qatar
- Municipality: Al-Shahaniya
- Zone: Zone 72
- District no.: 201

Area
  - Total: 8.0 sq mi (20.6 km^{2})
- Time zone: UTC+3 (AST)

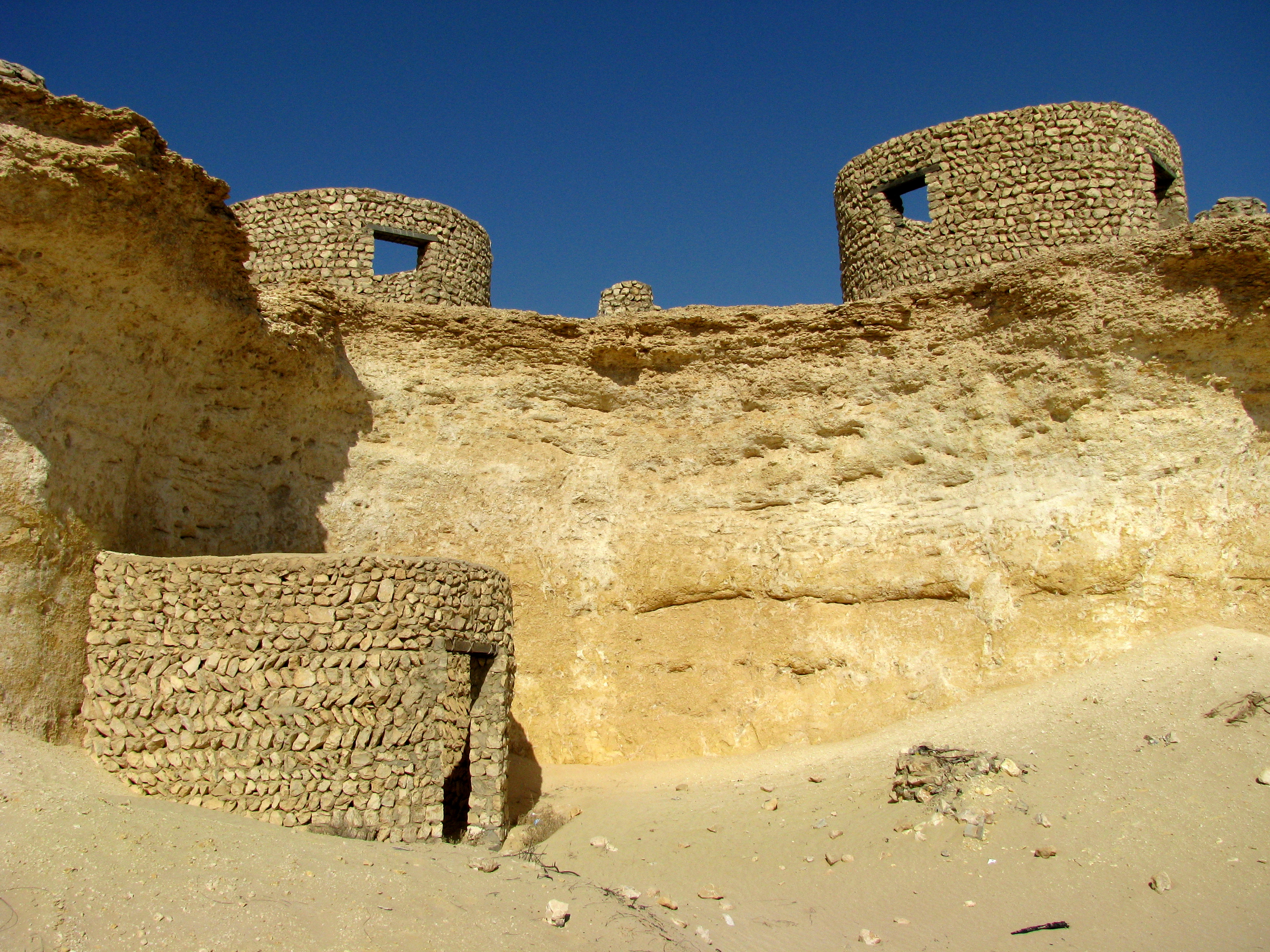
Reconstructed ruins atop a limestone cliff in the Zekreet Peninsula

Zekreet (Arabic: زكريت) is a village in north-western Qatar near Dukhan and about 80 km (50 mi) north-west west of Doha. Originally a sparsely populated area, Zekreet was built up in the 1940s after oil operations commenced in Qatar. This included the construction of a harbor for oil equipment and some small houses which eventually developed into a village. There are several visitor attractions and old ruins at the site including the Zekreet Fort, which is housed to the immediate north of the village.

== Etymology ==
The village's name is derived from the Arabic word zikra, which translates to "memories". Originally, the name applied to a nearby rawda which had sentimental value for its inhabitants, but the name was eventually given to the village itself.

Zekreet is also spelled as Zikrit and Zekrit. An area known by a similar name called Bir Zekrit (more commonly known as Ras Abrouq) is located north of Zekreet.

== History ==
=== Pre-20th century ===
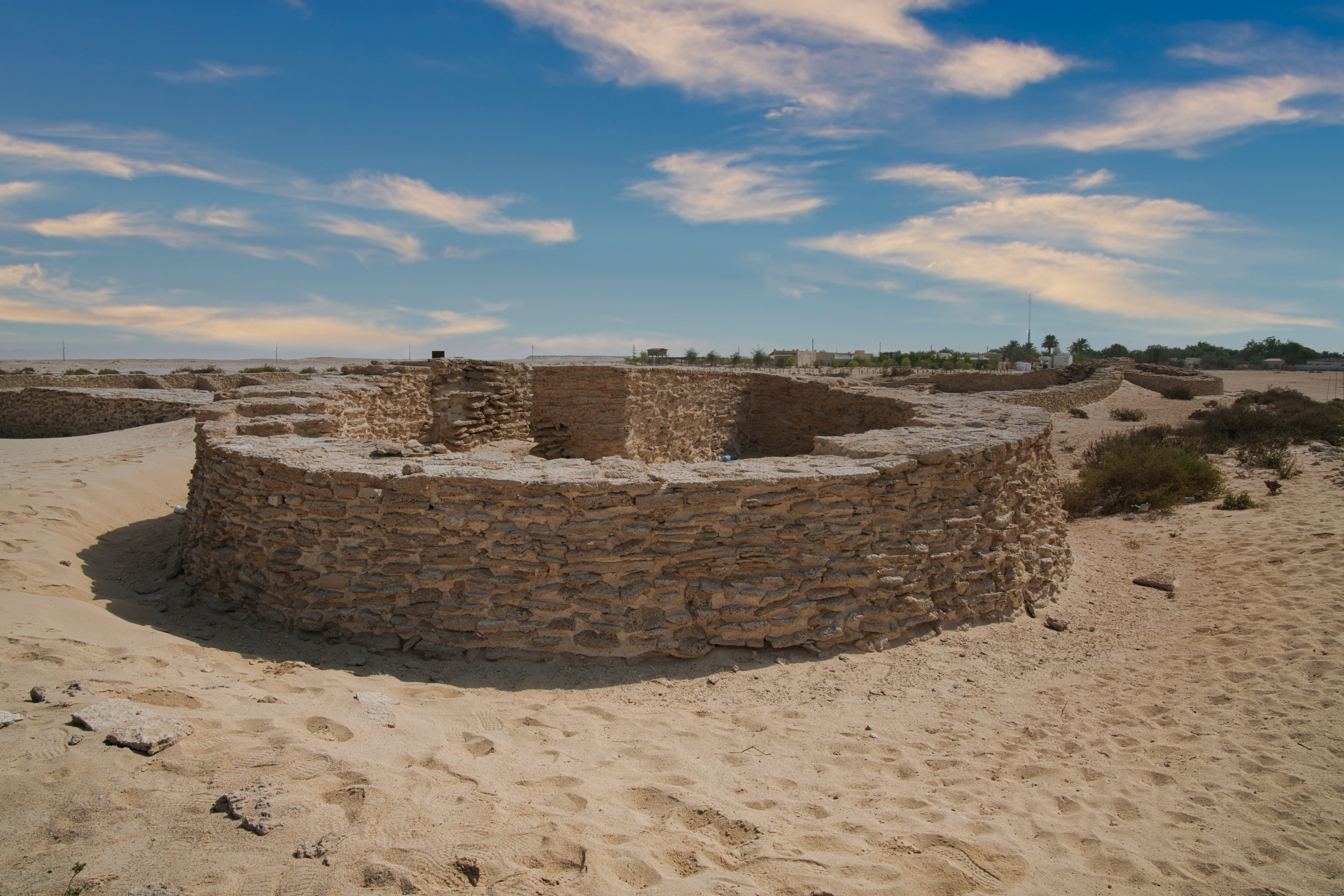
Remains of the historic Zekreet Fort

Zekreet was likely inhabited during the late 18th and early 19th centuries, the same era that saw the rise of the nearby northern settlements of Zubarah and Al Huwaila. Historic references to the area in English are scarce, but a local fort was mentioned by J.G. Lorimer, who claimed it was built by the pirate ruler of Qatar Rahmah ibn Jabir al-Jalahimah in c. 1800. The village may have been abandoned around 1811, in the same period that Zubarah was sacked.

=== 20th century ===
Oil was discovered for the first time in Qatar in 1936 in the nearby mountain range of Jebel Dukhan to the south. The western side of the Bay of Zekreet, across the bay from the village, accommodated the first shallow-water harbor in Qatar to be used by oil companies to unload their equipment during the 1930s and 1940s. It was planned by Bahraini architect Abdulla bin Ali Al-Mal. Food supplies and fresh water from Bahrain were also imported here. The growth and formation of the modern village of Zekreet were dependent on this harbor, however, it was subsequently made obsolete by Mesaieed Harbor in 1952, and by the 1960s was decommissioned.

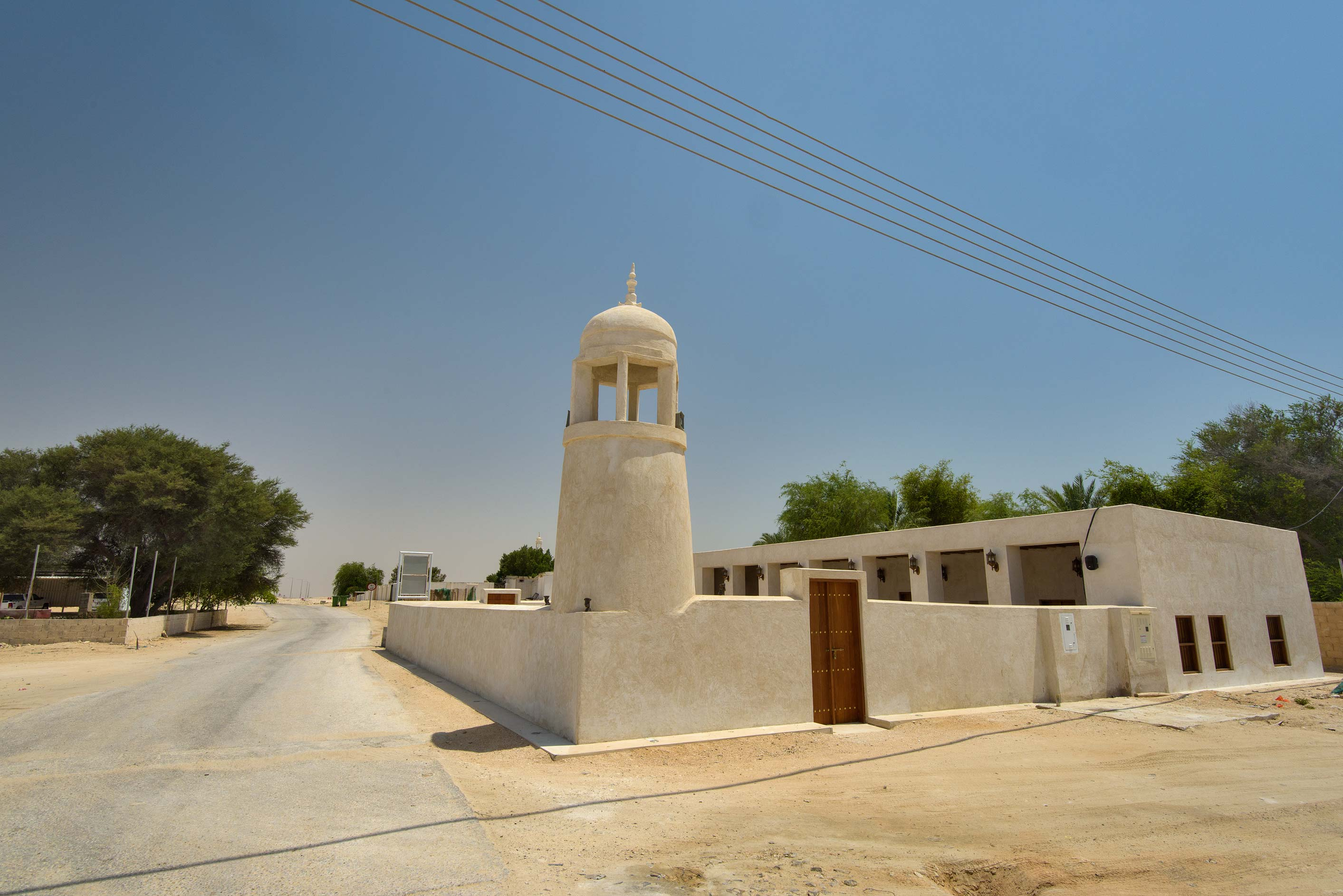
Close-up view of the historic mosque in Zekreet

Like most settlements in Qatar, seawater intrusion contaminated the coastal aquifers, therefore the contemporary village was established inland on the other side of the bay near existing water wells on the Zekreet Peninsula. Many inhabitants from eastern and northern Qatar migrated to the Dukhan region in the 1950s to find work in the oil industry; notable tribes among these migrants were the Al Muhannadi, the Bani Hajer and the Na'im. Population estimates in 1950 put the number of men at 200 and women at 250 in the fledgling village. Zekreet opened its first primary school for boys in 1957 with a capacity of 45 students, making it the first settlement in the region to establish a formal school. In 1960, the village's first primary school for girls was founded with roughly 26 seats. Throughout the late 1950s and 1960s, all inhabitants of the western industrial settlements sent their children to these two schools.

Subsequently, the government decided to centralize all of the western region's infrastructure in the city of Dukhan, and so in the 1970s Zekreet's two schools were closed and its students shifted to the schools' replacements in Dukhan. The population of Zekreet sharply fell in the following years; by 1990 it was estimated that it had only 50 households. A majority of its residents were still employed in the energy sector.

=== 21st century ===
In January 2019, it was estimated that Zekreet had about 7,000 people living in the village, mainly expat workers.

== Geography ==
Zekreet is situated near the bottom small stretch of land known as the Zekreet Peninsula which protrudes into the Persian Gulf and of which Ras Abrouq occupies the northern extremity. Dukhan is the closest sizable settlement. To the west of the village is the Bay of Zekreet, a half-moon shaped bay which in the past was an extension of the 20 km-long (12 mi) Dukhan Sabkha. There is a cape protruding into the bay known as Ras Zekreet. Much of the area is associated with erosional landforms such as foothills and mesas.

== Industry ==
As of 2017, QatarEnergy LNG is in the process of implementing the $600 million Zekreet Gasoline Project. It will eventually produce up to 75,000 barrels per day.

== Archaeology ==
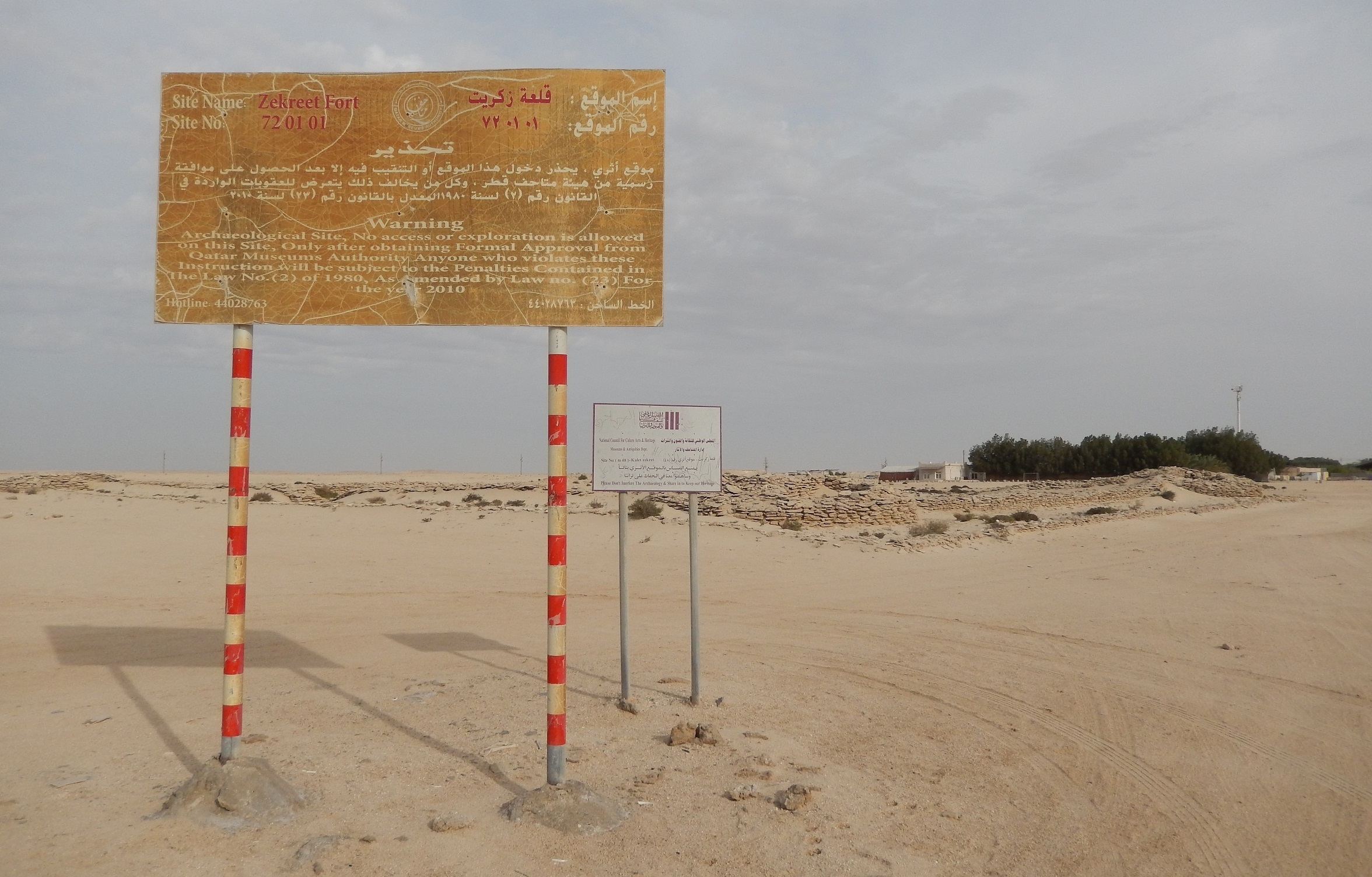
The protected archaeological site of Zekreet Fort

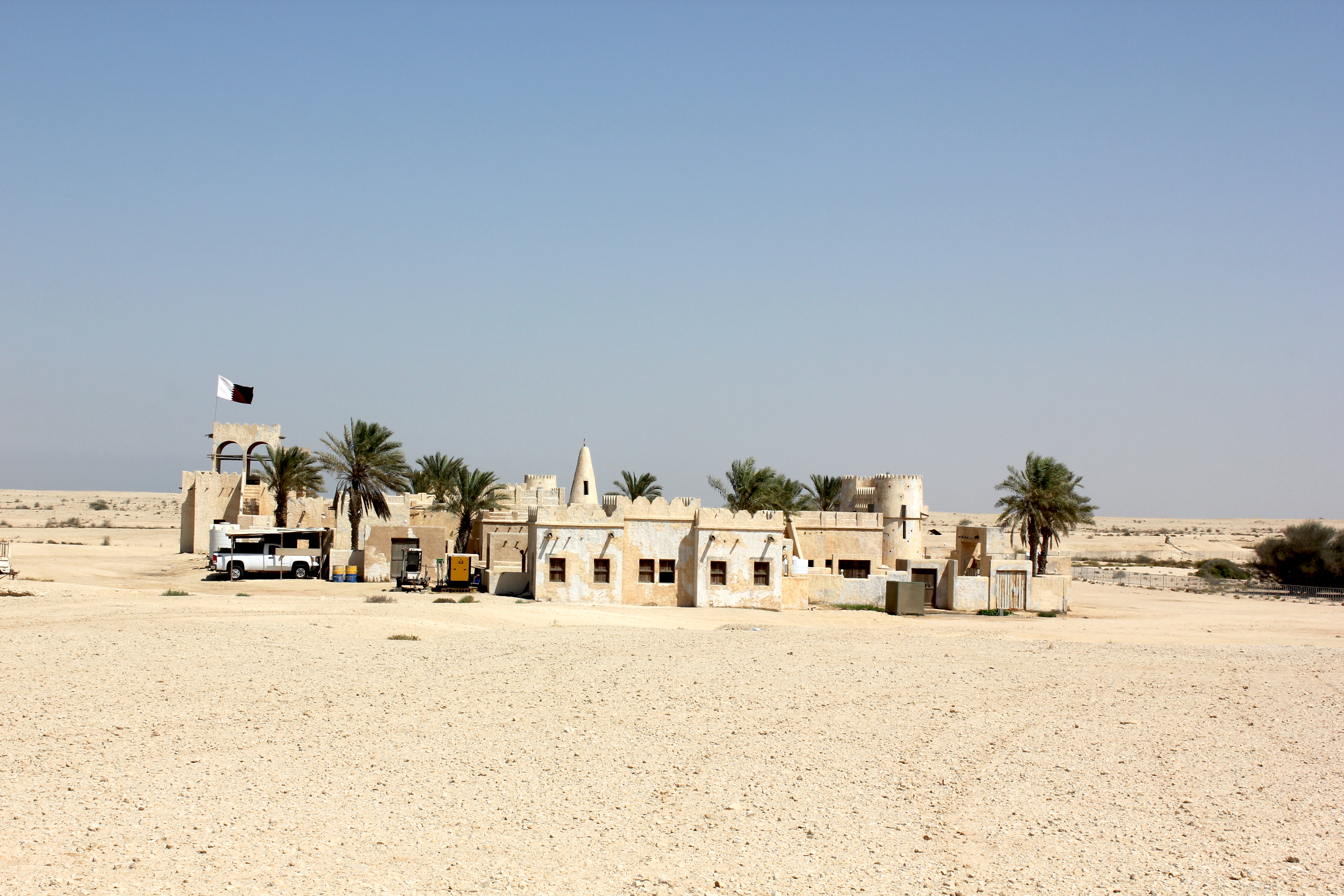
Far view of the Film City in Zekreet

The first archaeological excavations at Zekreet took place in 1973–1974 by a team led by Beatrice de Cardi. Zekreet Fort was discovered during this period. The area was again excavated by a French team from 2002 to 2005 and the contents of this excavation were analyzed in 2006. The total area of the excavated site was 18,000 m^{2} (4.4 acres).

Nineteenth-century ceramics have been discovered on site. Some of the pottery has been traced back to China.

== Visitor attractions ==
=== Zekreet Fort ===
Zekreet Fort has been dated to the late 18th or early 19th century. The fort's shape is quadrangular with four circular watchtowers. At the time of its initial construction, the fort did not have any towers. The towers were instead added to each side in a reconstruction phase. Facilities for "debis" (date syrup) production are believed to have been at the site.

=== Film city ===
A replica city was built to the north of Zekreet for use in film production. It includes a large fort surrounded by palm trees.

=== House of the imam ===
The Qatar Museums Authority has started a project to repackage a house belonging to the former imam of Zekreet during the 1950s as a cultural venue where educational workshops are held. As part of the repackaging, a passage will be constructed from the building to Richard Serra's sculptures in Ras Abrouq.

=== Zekreet Mosque ===
Constructed in 1940, the Zekreet Mosque has long been considered a local landmark and has since been restored by Qatar Museums. The mosque features entrances along its northern and southern exterior walls. The entrance to the iwan of the qibla faces eastward. The mosque's iwans possess two window openings situated on the northern and southern exterior walls. The courtyard dimensions are 10.24 by 15.90 meters (33.6 by 52.2 ft). A designated area for ablution is located at the southeastern corner of the courtyard.

The minaret, positioned at the northeastern corner of the courtyard, is built upon a small square base. An arched door, accessed by a step, leads to a spiral staircase ascending to the minaret's summit. The minaret is cylindrical, crowned by a low circular dome supported by six columns. The open iwan connects to the courtyard through seven square arches and spans 3.17 meters (10.4 ft) meters in width, with an opening on each side. The enclosed iwan, or qibla iwan's area is roughly identical to that of the open iwan. The wall separating the open iwan from the enclosed iwan includes three doors, the central one facing the qibla. The badghirs of the open iwan have been sealed, the original doors have been replaced with metal ones, and the roof has been covered with corrugated sheet metal plates.

=== Zekreet Commercial Plaza ===
On an area of 6,692 m^{2} (72,030 sq ft), the Zekreet Commercial Plaza features 36 businesses, 31 residential units and several offices. Included among these businesses are restaurants, a bank, a post office, and a grocery store.

== Gallery ==
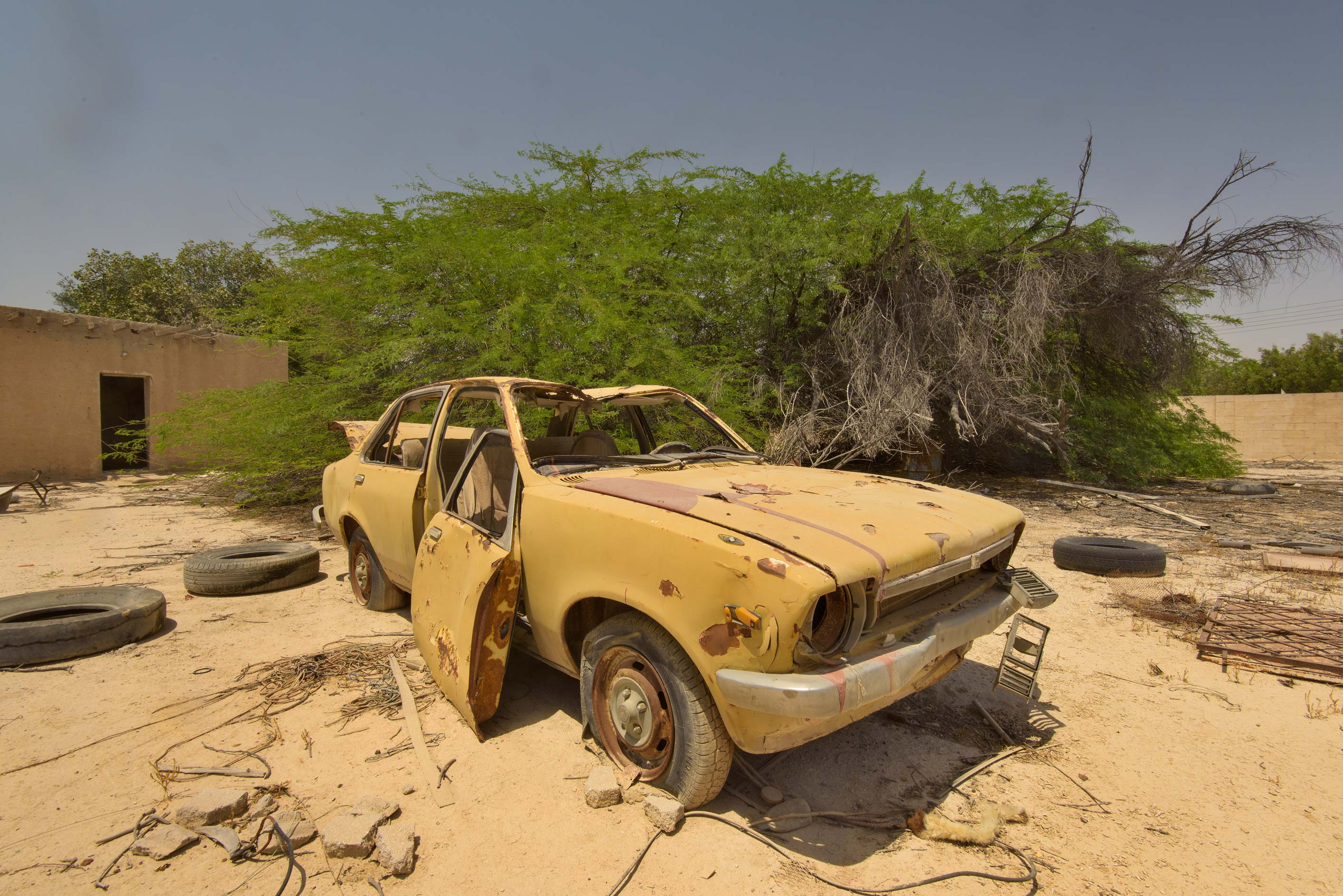
Abandoned vehicle in Zekreet

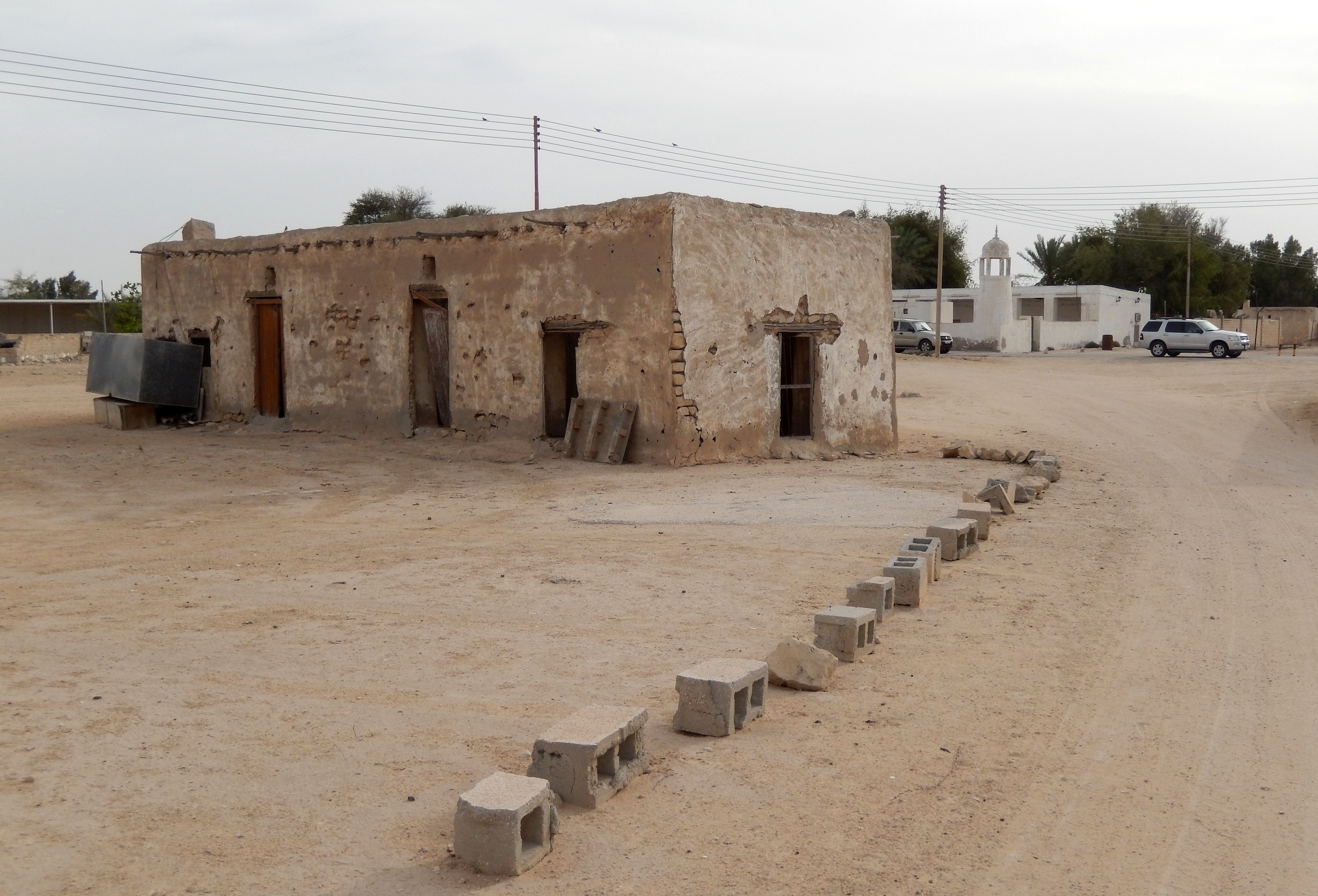
An old building in the village

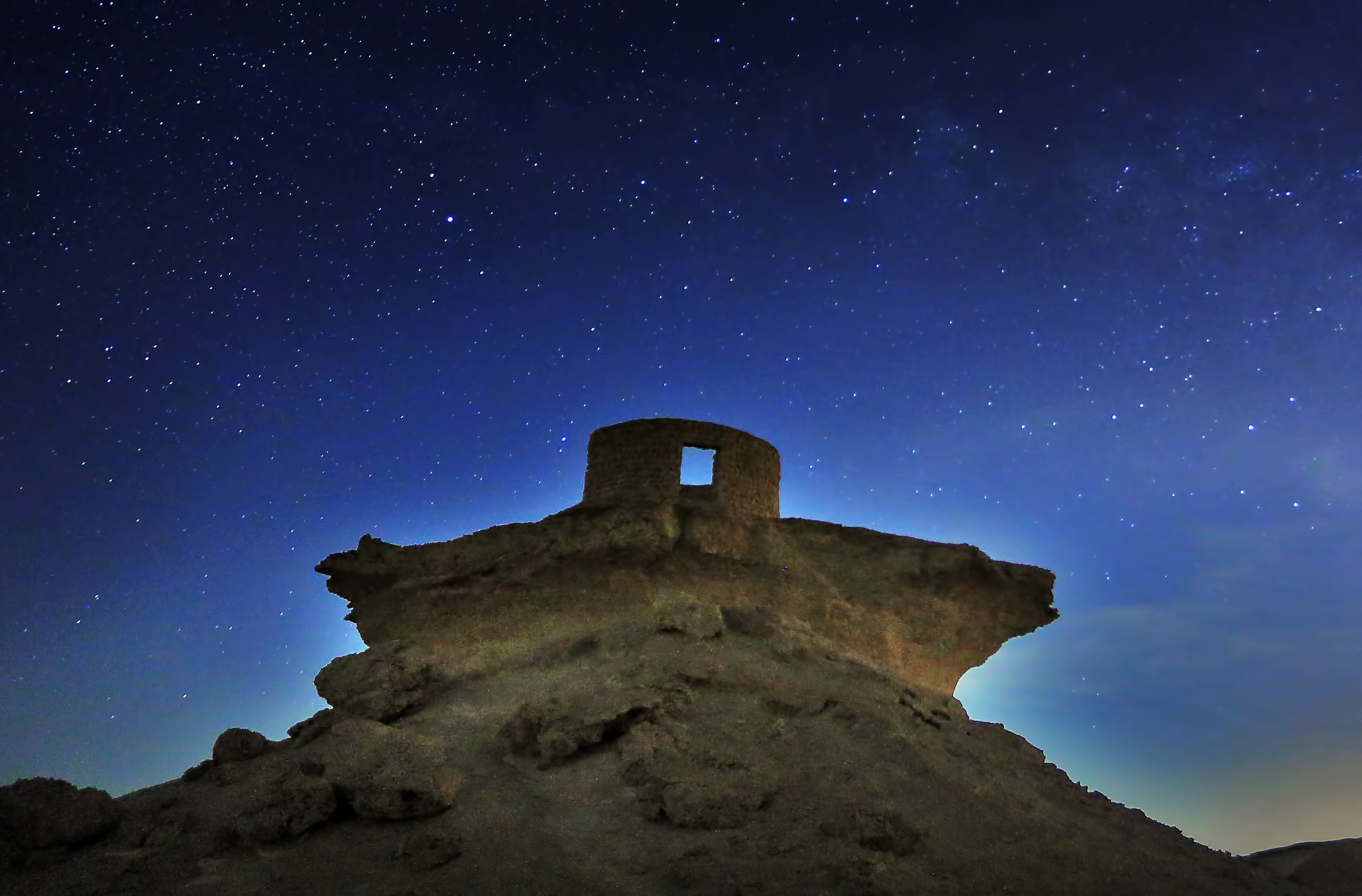
Reconstructed ruins on a limestone rock in the Zekreet Peninsula

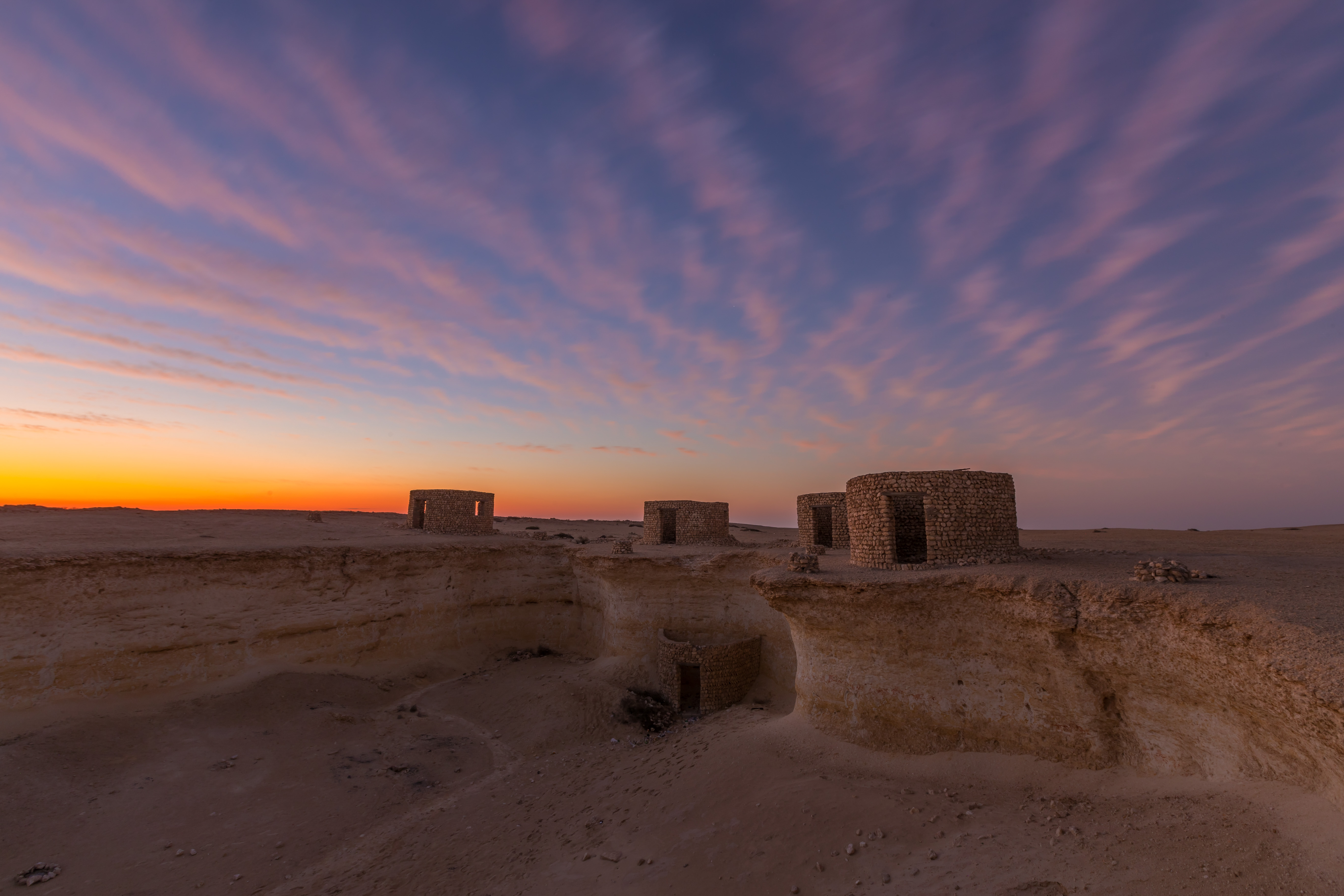
Reconstructed ruins

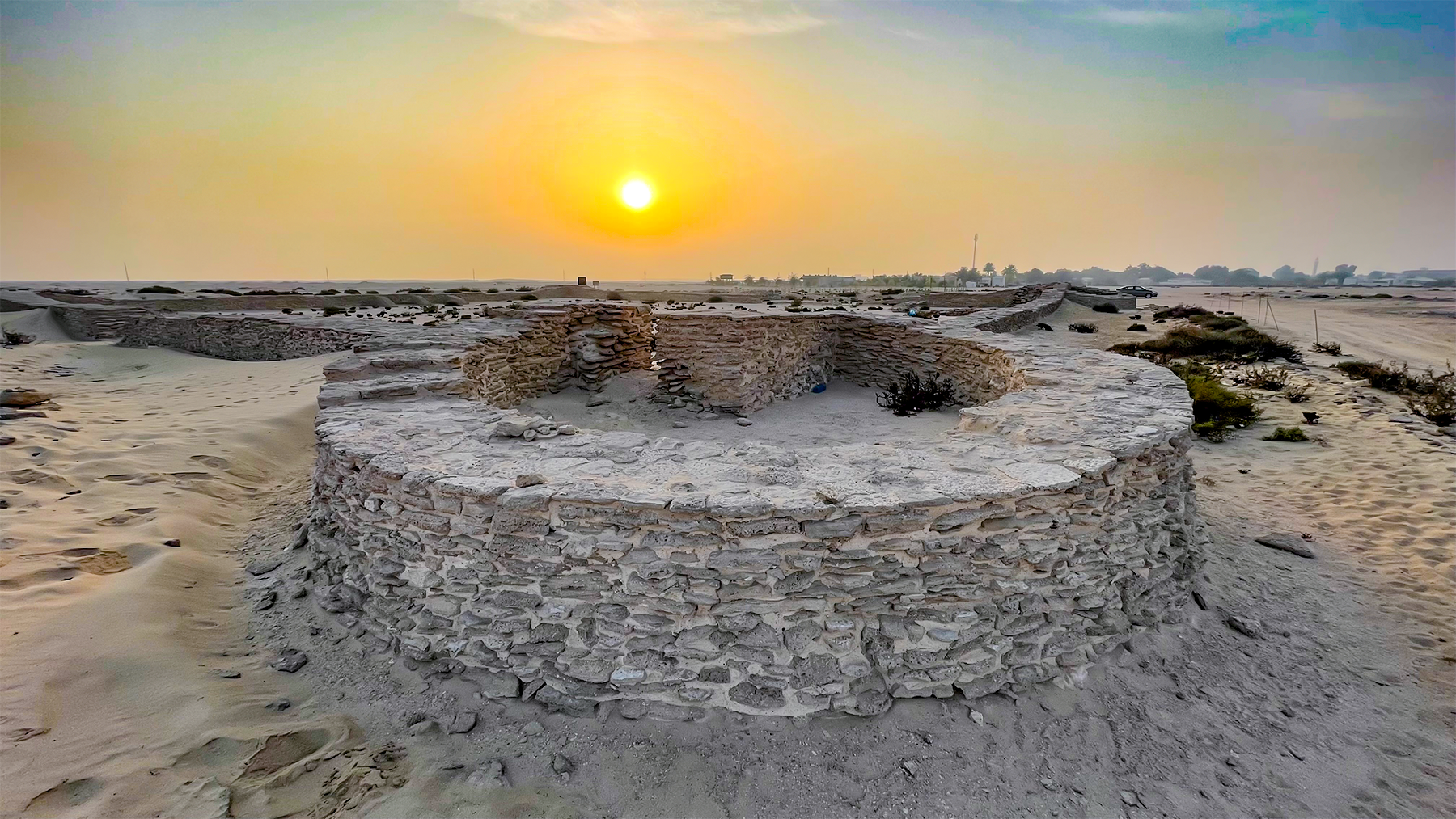
Zekreet Fort
