= Ras Abrouq =

Ras Abrouq رأس أبروق
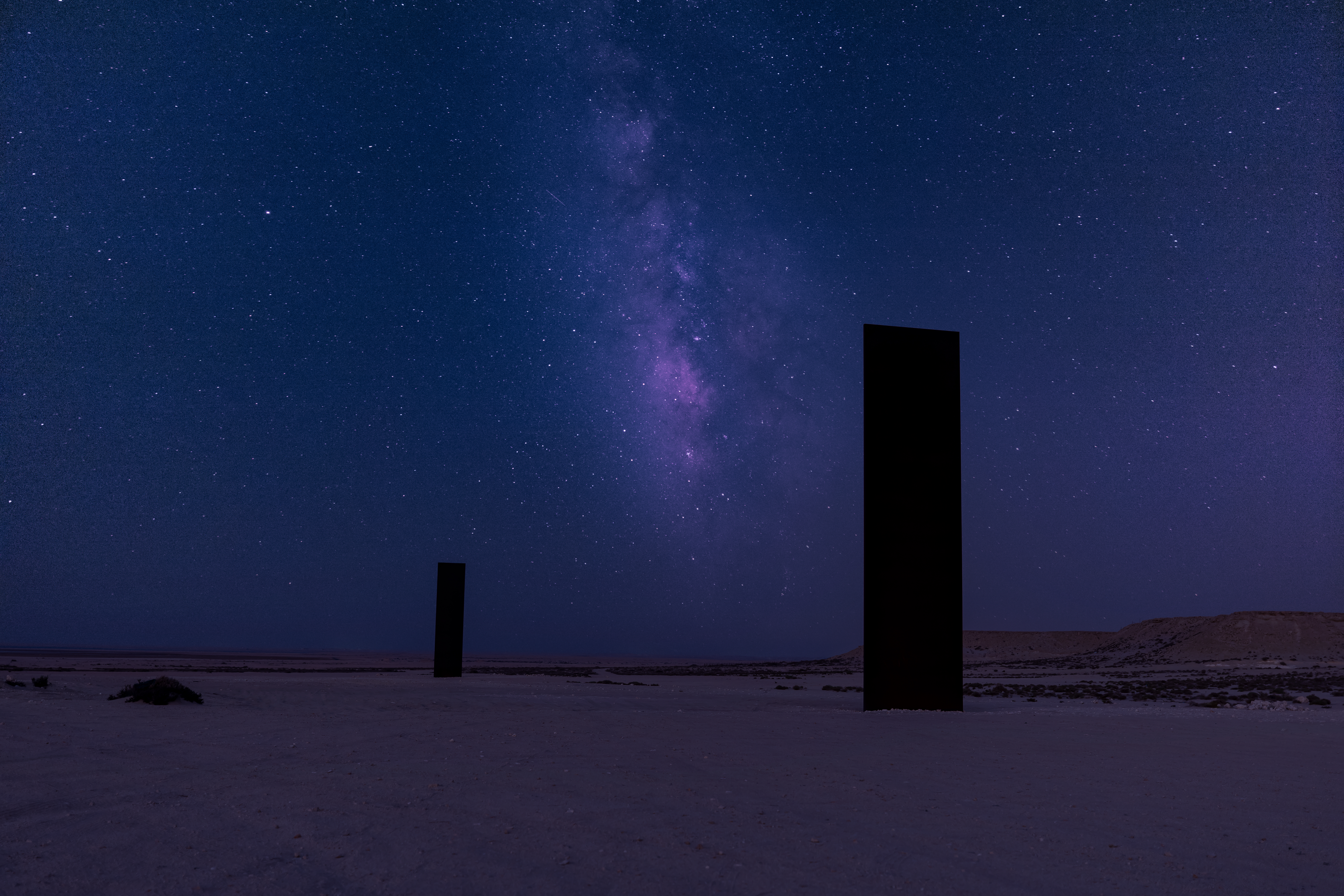
- Richard Serra's East-West/West-East sculpture seen in Ras Abrouq at night

- Location in Qatar
- Coordinates: 25°34′41″N 50°50′46″E
- Country: Qatar
- Municipality: Al-Shahaniya
- Zone: Zone 72
- District no.: 203

Area
  - Total: 11.6 sq mi (30.1 km^{2})
- Time zone: UTC+3 (AST)

Ras Abrouq (Arabic: رأس أبروق; also known as Bir Zekreet) is the northernmost extension of the Zekreet Peninsula, a stretch of land to the north of Dukhan in Qatar. It has a beach of the same name and various archaeological sites. Since the 21st century it has functioned as a tourist site.

Large parts of its territory are legally protected as a nature reserve for wild deer. Richard Serra's East-West/West-East sculpture was completed in Brouq Nature Reserve in 2014 at the behest of the Qatar Museums Authority.

== Etymology ==
The Arabic word ras translates to "head", and in this context refers to a cape. The second element, abrouq, is derived from a nearby range of light-colored hills in the Zekreet Peninsula (also known as the Abrouq Peninsula). These hills are said to shimmer in the sunlight, resembling barq ("lightning").

Its name is also spelled as Ras Broog.

== Geography ==
Ras Abrouq is a cape on the tip of the Zekreet Peninsula near the city of Dukhan in western Qatar. It is 70 km (43 mi) west of the capital Doha. It overlooks the Dawakhil Islands to the north, serving as a significant coastal landmark. The village of Zekreet is located south of Ras Abrouq.

Geographically, it forms the northernmost point of the Dukhan region. The coastal area is relatively narrow, measuring about 3 km (1.9 mi) in width, in contrast to the wider sections of the Dukhan region further south.

== Archaeology ==
Ras Abrouq is one of the most extensive Neolithic sites in Qatar. It has one of the highest proportions of Ubaid potsherds in Qatar. Excavations in the 1970s revealed a ring-like structure, hearths, Ubaid pottery, cairns, and stone tools dating to the Neolithic period. Many fish bones and snail shells were also recovered. G.H. Smith, an excavator of the site, suggested that it was a seasonal encampment and that its inhabitants had trade relations with nearby civilizations.

Further archaeological excavations yielded Barbar ceramics originating from the Dilmun civilization dating to the third millennium BC. A number of chambered cairns dating to the same period contained 108 beads made of stone and shell.

Excavations conducted during the mid-20th century uncovered potsherds with Seleucid characteristic and a cairnfield consisting of 100 burial mounds dating to the 3rd century BC. The relatively large number of cairns suggest a sizable sea-faring community prevailed in the area during this period.

Further excavations revealed a fishing station dating to c. 140 BC which was used by foreign vessels to dry fish during the Sasanian period. A number of stone structures and large quantities of fish bones were recovered from the site.

== Gallery ==
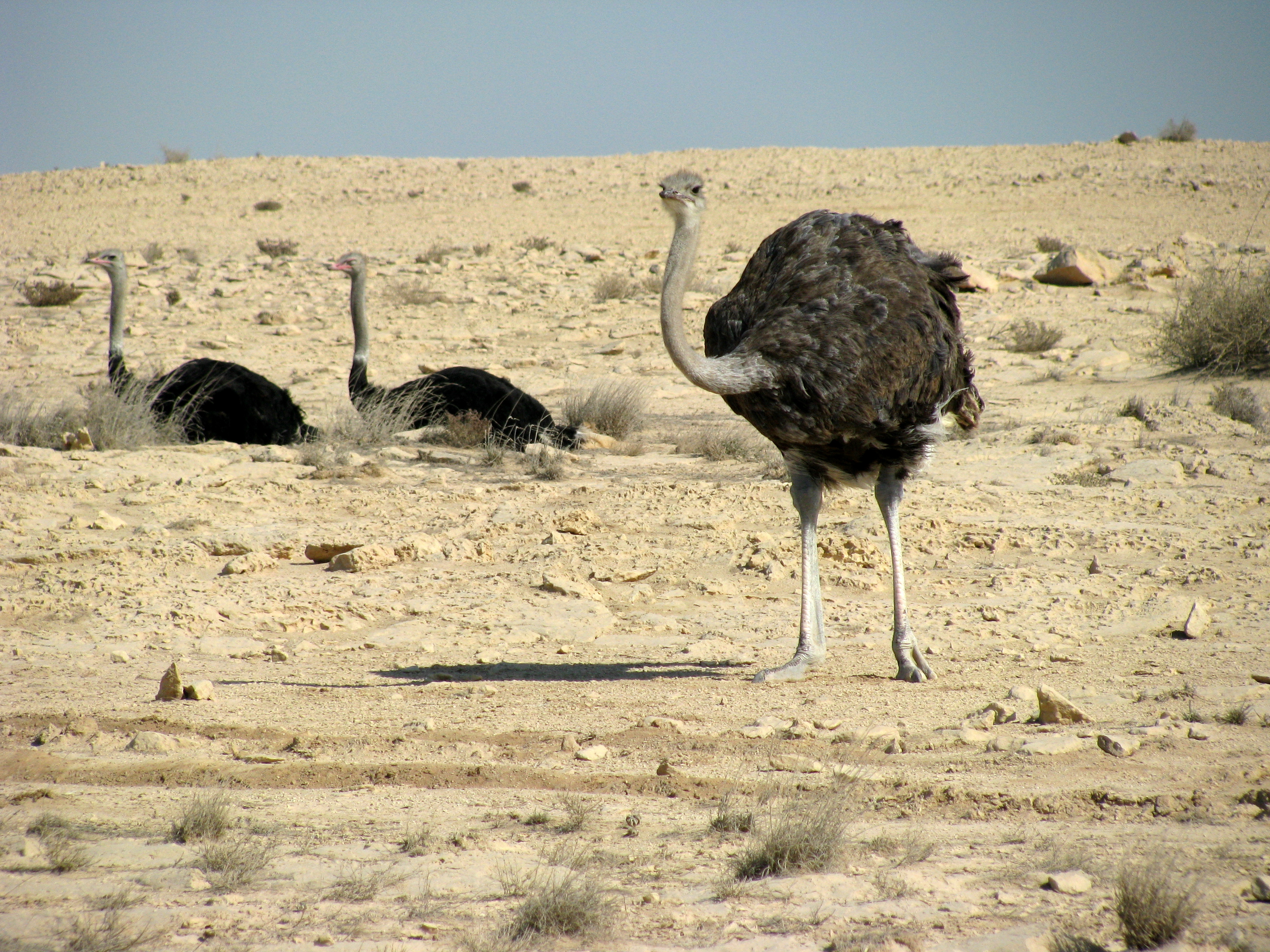
Ras Abrouq contains a high concentration of ostriches

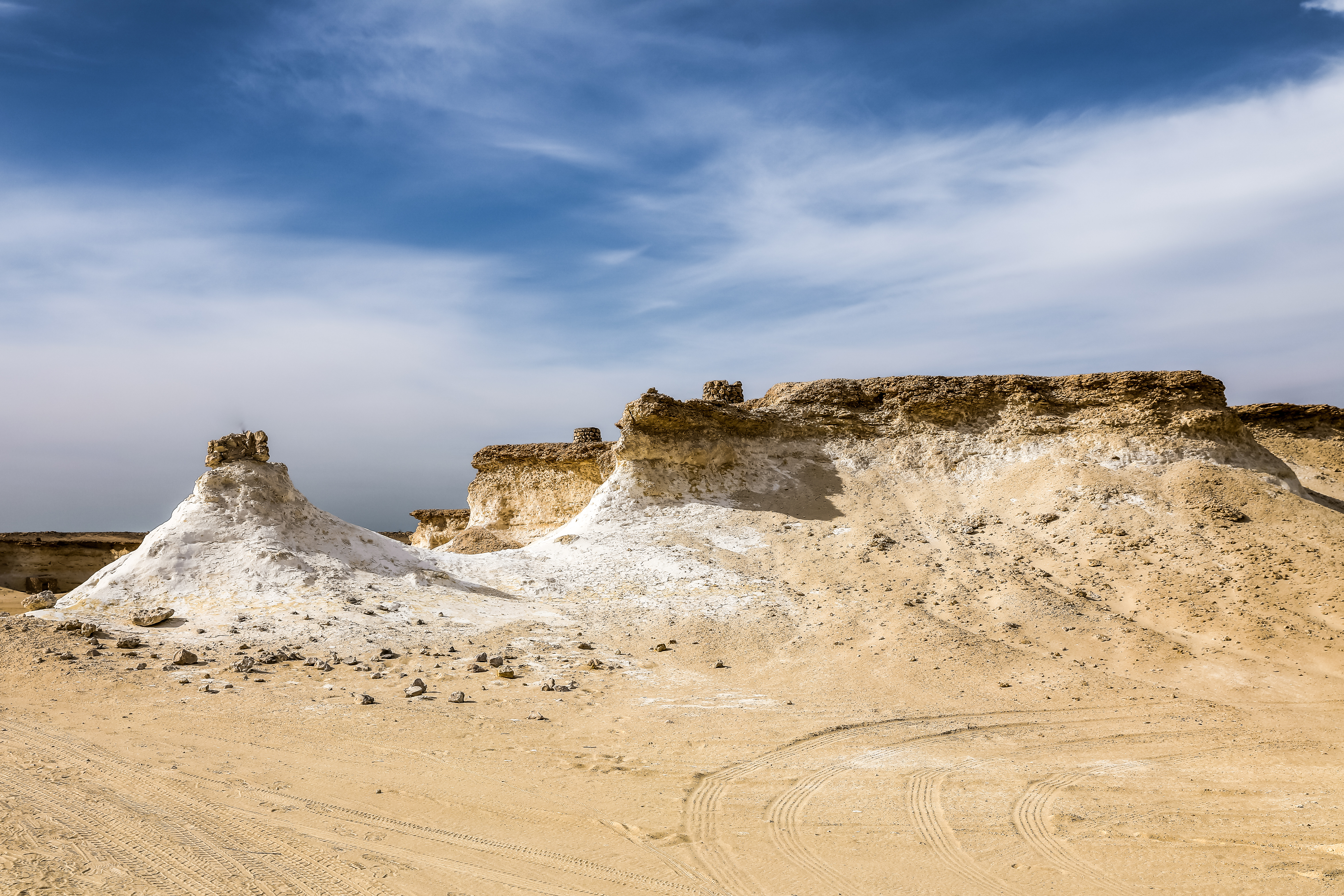
Hills in Ras Arouq

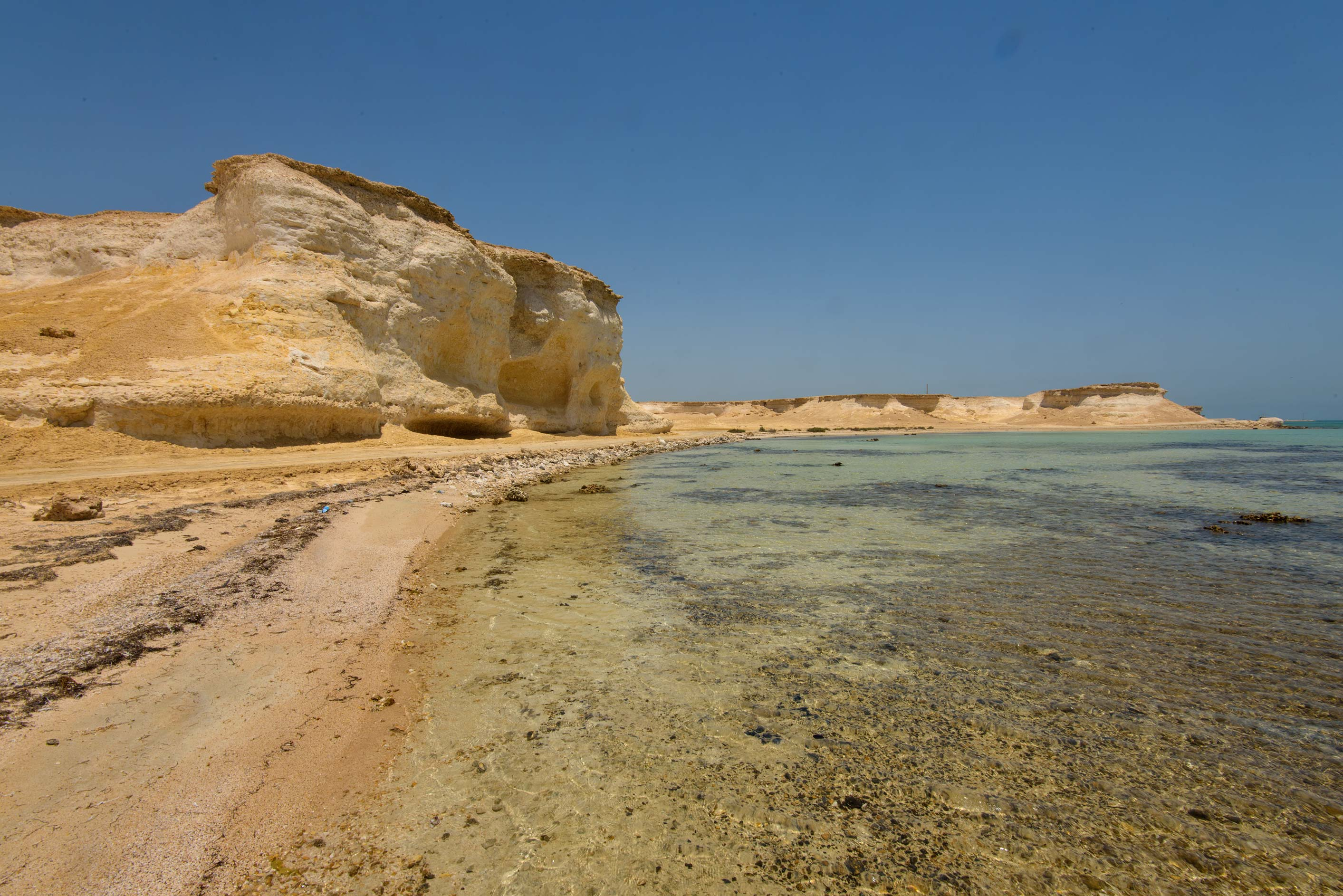
Sandstone cliffs at the cape
