= Bay of Zekreet =

Coordinates: 25°30′30″N 50°49′43″E

The Bay of Zekreet (Arabic: دَوْحَة زِكْرِيت, romanized: Dawḩat az Zikrīt) is a half-moon shaped bay on the Zekreet Peninsula in western Qatar. The Zekreet Peninsula is a rocky, sandy desert, with numerous rock formations and gypsum plateaux. The bay is situated to the north of the industrial city of Dukhan and to the southwest of the village of Zekreet. It is located to the north of the Dukhan Sabkha, and is separated by a straight depression known as Rawdat Jarrah. Geologists have theorized that this depression was an extension of the Bay of Zekreet prior to the drop in sea levels c. 3,000 years ago.

== Geology ==
The area spanning from Dukhan to the upper part of the Bay of Zekreet is the only surface of Qatar where an entire section of the Eocene Dammam Formation is exposed.

== History ==
A settlement dating to the early 19th century was discovered at the southern end of the bay, and was possibly presided over by the pirate ruler of Qatar, Rahmah ibn Jabir al-Jalahimah. Another archaeological site, Uwaynat Ali, is found on the other side of the bay.

The western side of the bay hosted the shallow-water harbor used to unload supplies for Qatar's oil industry. The growth of the modern village of Zekreet, which is across the bay, was dependent on this harbor. Shortly after the Mesaieed Harbor opened in 1952 it was made obsolete.
