= Zekreet Peninsula =

Peninsula in Qatar

Coordinates: 25°34′N 50°51′E

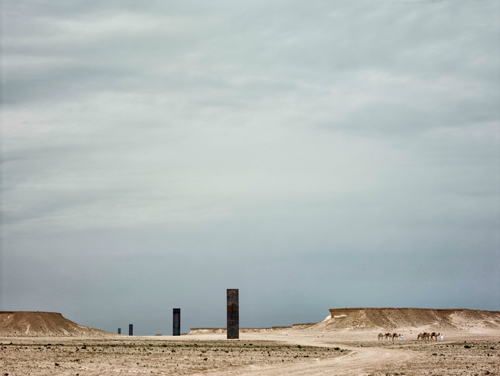
Richard Serra's East-West/West-East installation in the Zekreet Peninsula

The Zekreet Peninsula, also known as the Abrouq Peninsula, is located to the north of the industrial city of Dukhan in western Qatar. Much of the area is associated with erosional landforms such as foothills, mesas and gypsum plateaux. The village of Zekreet, the Zekreet Film City, and the headland of Ras Abrouq (which includes a nature reserve for wild deer) are all found on this stretch of land. The peninsula is part of the Al Reem Biosphere Reserve.

== Geography ==
One of its defining features is the Bay of Zekreet, which is shaped like a half-moon.

=== Geology ===
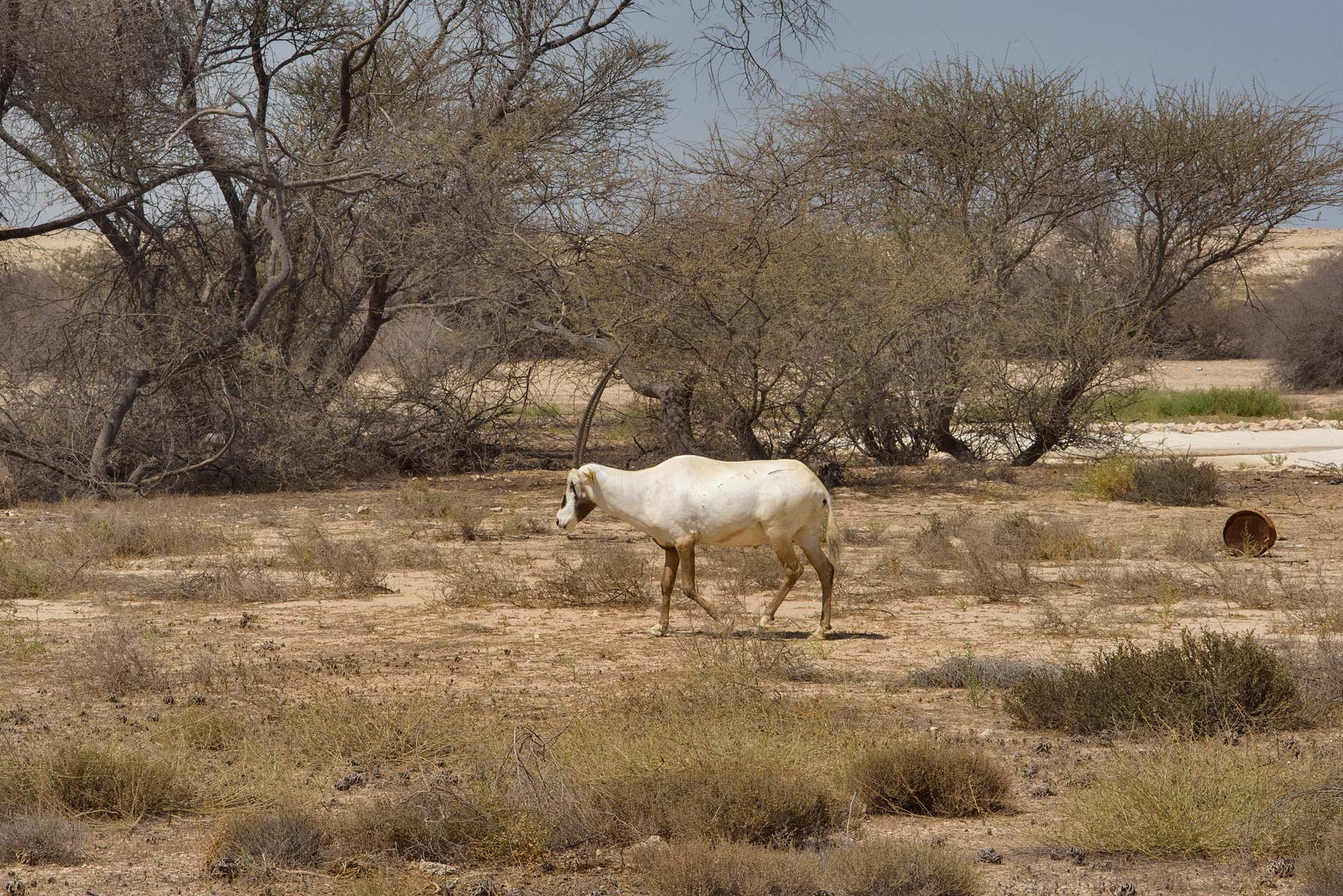
An Arabian oryx in a rawda near Zekreet Film City

The Abarug member of the Eocene-period Dammam Formation is the dominant structural-lithic unit of the area. The uppermost part of the Abarug member is formed of dull-colored slightly calcareous dolomitic limestone and is roughly 2 m (6.6 ft) thick, while the lower part is approximately 10 m (33 ft) thick and is composed of brightly-colored slightly calcareous dolomitic marl.

=== Wildlife ===
Common ostriches, wild deer and gazelles occur in the peninsula. The Ministry of Municipality and Environment advises tourists not to visit during the ostrich breeding season due to their aggressive tendencies.

Flamingos are commonly found near the Bay of Zekreet.

The peninsula is a popular destination for foreign tourists due to its unspoiled beaches and limestone rock formations. Visitors frequently camp here overnight. However, some of the natural geography has suffered as a result of litter left behind, damage to the vegetation and land degradation caused by tourists.
