= Dukhan Sabkha =

Coordinates: 25.394°N 50.845°E

Dukhan Sabkha, located in the northern section of the Dukhan region in western Qatar, is the largest inland sabkha (a type of saltflat) ecosystem found in the Persian Gulf. The sabkha runs for approximately 20 kilometres (12 mi), occupies an area of 73 km^{2} (28 sq mi), has a width of 2 km (1.2 mi) to 4 km (2.5 mi) and a depth of between 6 metres (20 ft) and 7 metres (23 ft) below sea level. Consequently, the lowest point of Qatar is in the sabkha. It is situated roughly 10 km (6.2 mi) east of the city of Dukhan and 2 km (1.2 mi) from Dukhan Highway. The Dukhan Field is to its immediate west.

== Description ==
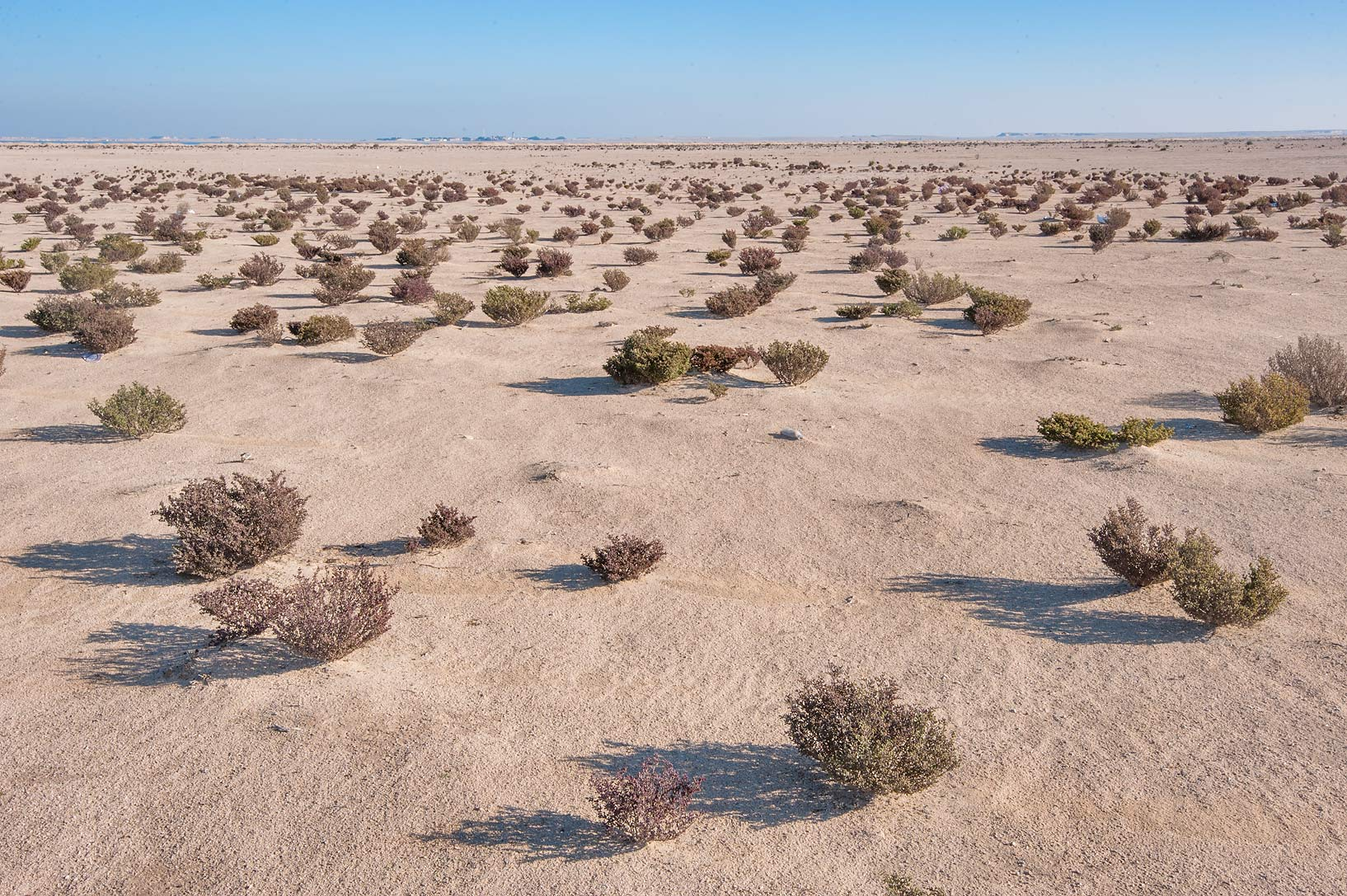
Rawdat Jarrah, a depression that separates the Dukhan Sabkha from the Bay of Zekreet

The sabkha is fed by seawater from the Bay of Zekreet, north by approximately 3 kilometres (1.9 mi). Geologists have theorized that Rawdat Jarrah, the depression separating Dukhan Sabkha from the Bay of Zekreet, was an extension of the bay prior to the drop in sea levels c. 3,000 years ago.

Various species of algae are found on the sabkha's surface.

As a result of high uranium content, the sabkha has very high levels of radioactivity, ranging from a mean of 16 to 75 cps.

Salinity levels are high in the sabkha. Among the reasons for this include the intrusion of seawater, a prevailing desert climate and salt deposition from sediment runoff. The soil lacks nutrients of any substantial quantities except for sodium chloride and calcium. Qatar's government has designated plots of land within the sabkha for biosaline agricultural experimentation to determine which salt-tolerant plant species grow best in sabkha habitats.

== Geology ==
Its main constituents are aggregation sediments, evaporites, and an assemblage of wind-blown sediments. Sediments within the sabkha differ from other sabkhas in the region. Here, they are described as mainly comprising brownish-grey wind-blown sand underneath halite crystals up to 2 metres (6.6 feet) thick. Gypsum crystals are also found overlaying the sabkha, particularly in its centre. The chemical breakdown of these deposits is shown to be 33% anhydrite, 19% halite, 10% gypsum, 14% dolomite and 18% quartz.
