= Dukhan =

Dukhan دخان
- City
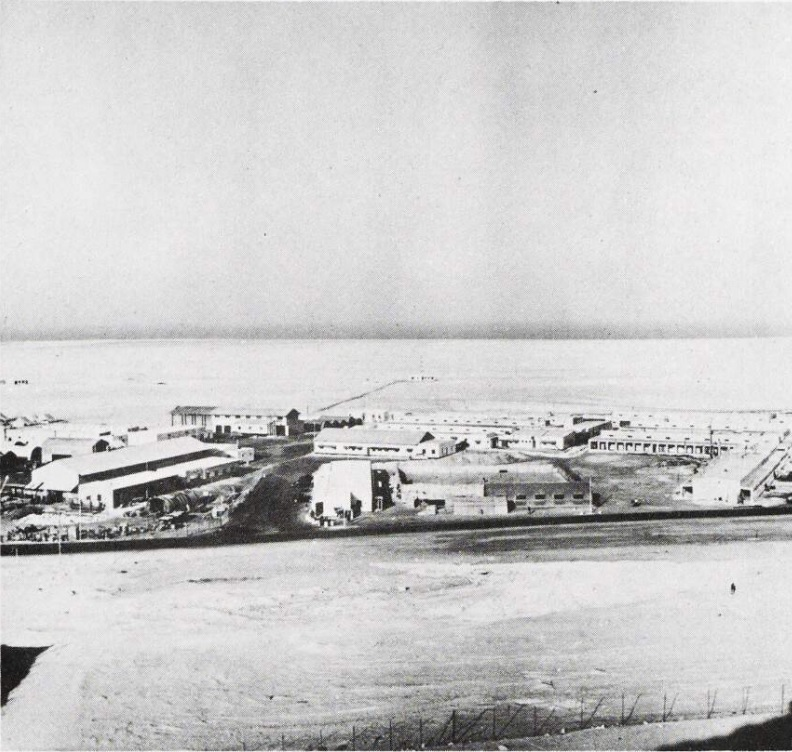
- Aerial view of Dukhan in 1959

- Location in Qatar
- Coordinates: 25°25′10″N 50°47′32″E
- Country: Qatar
- Municipality: Al-Shahaniya
- Zone: Zone 86
- District no.: 621

Area
  - Total: 39.8 sq mi (103.2 km^{2})
- Time zone: UTC+3 (AST)
- Website: Official website

Dukhan (Arabic: دخان, lit. 'smoke') is a city in the western municipality of Al-Shahaniya, Qatar. It is approximately 80 kilometres (50 mi) west of the capital, Doha. Dukhan is administered by Qatar's state oil agency QatarEnergy and is the site of the first oil discovery in Qatar. It was previously a part of Al Rayyan municipality.

All the industrial operations inside the city are administered by the Dukhan Operations Department. A Dukhan entry gate pass from QatarEnergy is required for entry to the city. Dukhan Highway, a four-lane motorway that runs for approximately 66 kilometres (41 miles), connects the city with Doha. In recent years, Dukhan has also become part of Qatar’s shift toward renewable energy, including the development of a large-scale solar power project.

== Etymology ==
In Mike Morton's biography, In the Heart of the Desert, it is noted that the English translation of Dukhan is "smoky mountain" (Jebel Dukhan)— a reference to the clouds that gathered around its summit, and, colloquially, to the smoke emitted from gas flares around the oil camp named after it.

== History of oil operations ==
=== Early operations ===
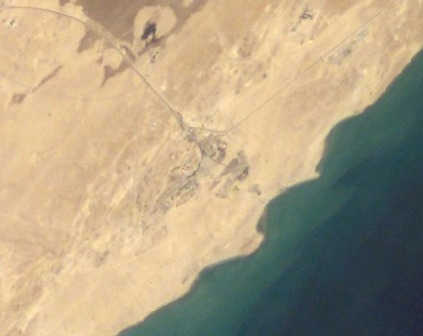
Satellite imagery of Dukhan on the western coast in 2008

Oil exploration in the Dukhan area began in 1935. In 1937, oil was discovered in Dukhan, making it the first major oil reserve found in Qatar. The discovery marked a turning point in Qatar’s economic development by enabling the large-scale production of oil. It also contributed to the country’s transition from a pearling-based economy to an oil-based economy. The development of the Dukhan oil field laid the foundation for Qatar’s modern energy sector. Construction on Dukhan's first oil well began in 1939 and was finished the next year. The original settlement was built as an oil camp for personnel of the Qatar Petroleum Company (today QatarEnergy). Oil operations were temporarily shut down during World War II.

Supplies such as freshwater and food, as well as machinery, were imported from Bahrain through the shallow-water Zekreet Harbor, positioned slightly northward on the Bay of Zekreet. On 31 December 1949, Dukhan exported its first barrel of oil. On 28 March 1953, a massive fire erupted at well DK35, which was drilling the Arab-D reservoir. The full development of Dukhan's oil fields was completed in 1954. The city entered a new stage of development when the Dukhan power station was commissioned in 1958, and when natural gas was found in the Khuff Reservoir the following year at an average depth of 3,000 metres (10,000 ft).

=== Nationalization of oil industry (1973–present) ===
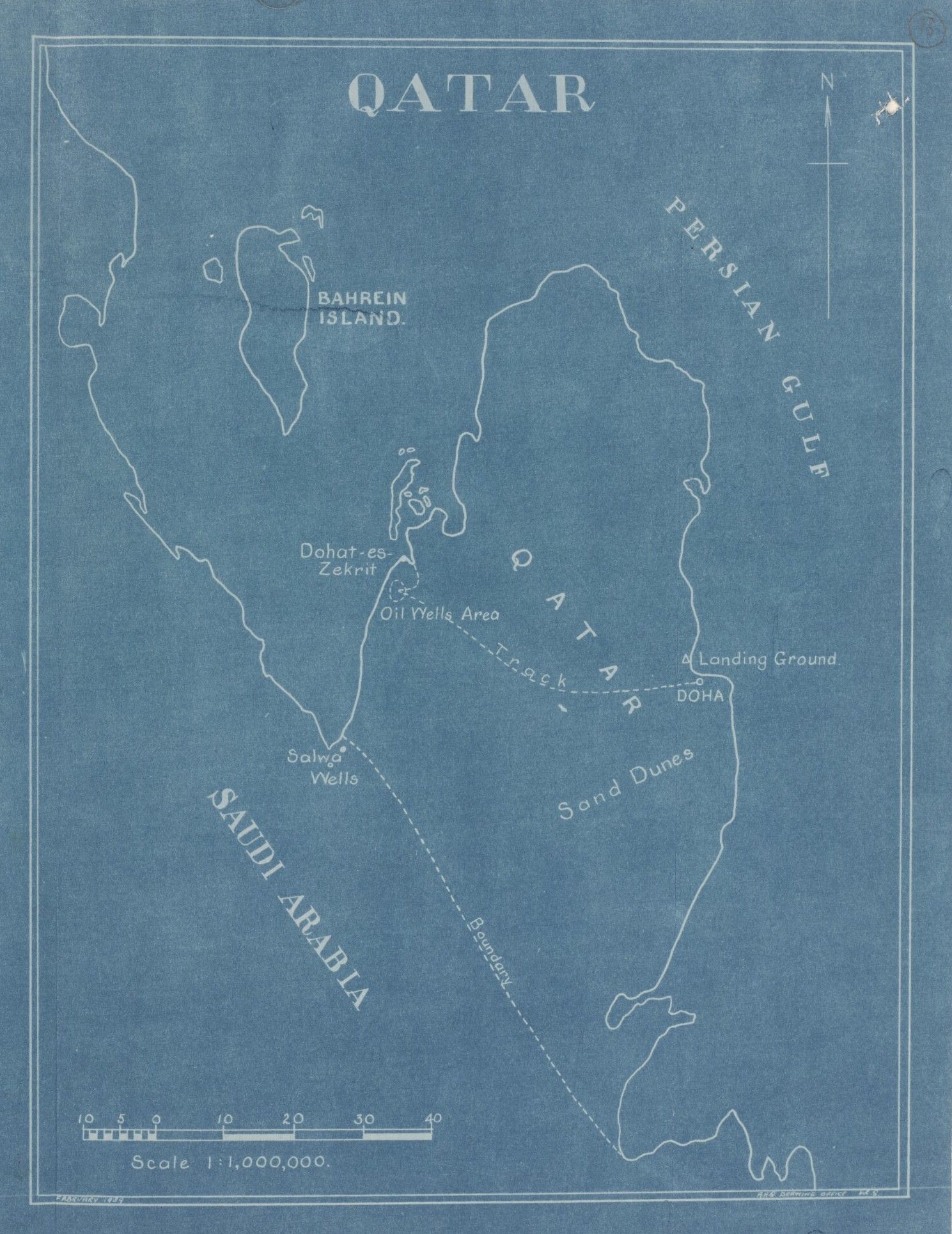
Blueprint sketch map of Qatar, drawn in February 1939, to illustrate the oil wells of Dukhan

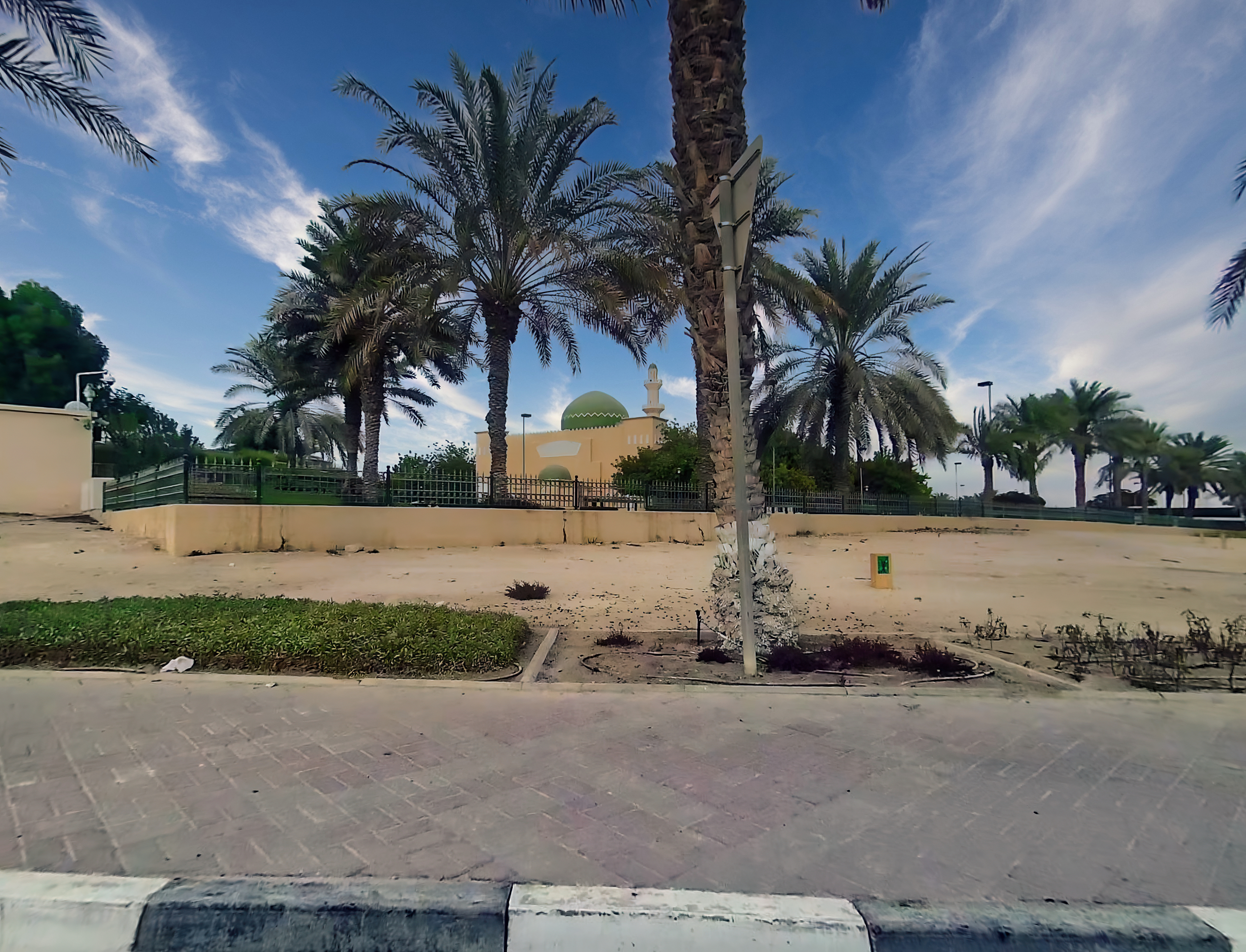
View of Dukhan Masjid, also known as Al Khotba Mosque, from Dukhan Western Road

Over the next few decades Dukhan's growth continued a steady pace. In 1974 the Fahahil plant was commissioned to recover raw natural gas liquids (NGL) from associated gas (which is found in either dissolved in crude oil or as a ‘cap’ of gas above the oil). This milestone was followed in 1976 by the first development well in the Khuff reservoir, and from 1978 to 1982 eight Khuff wellhead treatment plants were commissioned.

Dukhan expanded further in 1989, when the Dukhan reservoir power water injection (PWI) project began, to address the problem of rising water levels in the reservoirs. PWI helped to enhance oil recovery and maintain reservoir pressure in the Dukhan field. Meanwhile, the Fahahil compression station began operations in 1992, to pressurise the Khuff reservoir with surplus North Field gas and help stabilise production. Progress continued throughout the late 1990s and early years of this decade, with several major enhancements – including the two-stage Arab D project to develop the production of gas and condensates, inaugurated by the Emir of Qatar in 1998.

The Dukhan gas lift project was planned in 1999 to help maintain crude oil production. The implementation is still in progress and is set to supply gas to approximately 300 wells in the area. Also forthcoming is Phase VI of the Powered Water Injection (PWI) project, which will increase the number of PWI stations from two to three and result in greater PWI capacity – rising from 538,000 to 708,000 barrels of water per day.

== Oil-producing sectors ==
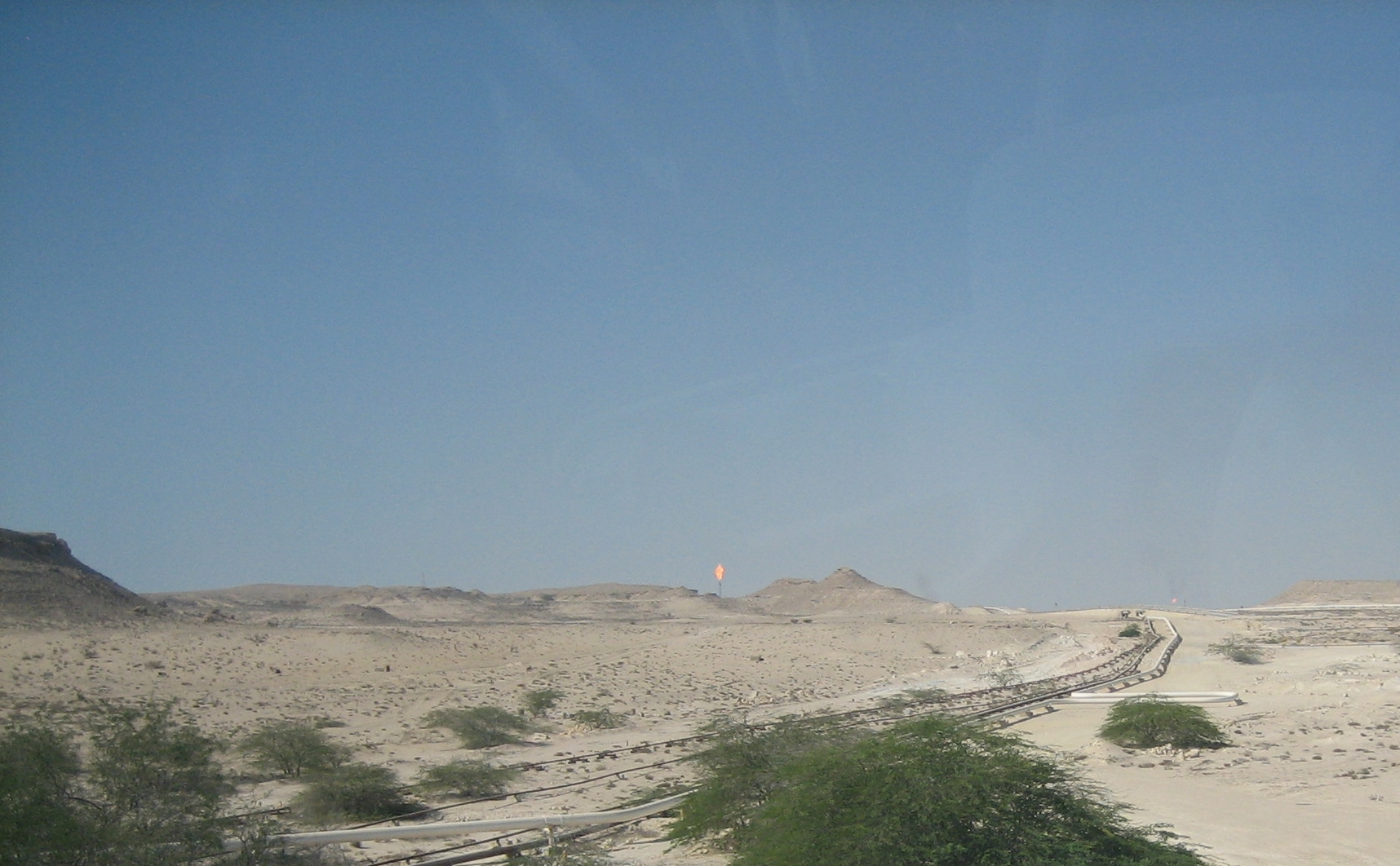
Pipeline system for Dukhan's oil wells. The gas flare of a petroleum refinery can be seen in the distance.

Dukhan has three main oil-producing sectors:

- The Khatiyah sector, which was developed in 1947.
- The Fahahil sector, which was developed between 1954 and 1955.
- The Jaleha sector, which was developed between 1954 and 1955.

== Industrial infrastructure ==
In 1990, there were 390 hydrocarbon wells in Dukhan, covering 0.08% of the area. Of the 390 wells, 140 were oil producing, 20 were gas producing and 219 were for other uses. The pipeline system for these wells covered 0.1% of the area and had an overall length 204 kilometres (127 mi). By 1990, there were seven degassing stations and two pumping stations. The Khatiyah sector was the most densely occupied in terms of infrastructure.

== Residential developments ==
Dukhan's residential area was developed at the same time oil operations began in 1940. The first residential area was a 3 square kilometres (1.2 sq mi) fenced oil camp situated in close proximity to the oil fields. Several issues limited the growth of the camp in its early years, such as lack of private ownership and its remoteness from the capital city. The camp comprised eight residential zones, along with administrative buildings, stores, workshops, and cultural facilities. It also included key community services such as two schools, a hospital, two mosques, and a church. Mike Morton remarked that in 1958, the oil camp had a club with tennis, billiards, hockey, football and cricket facilities, as well as a restaurant, a bar and a library. He claimed that the club's bar was the focal point of the camp.

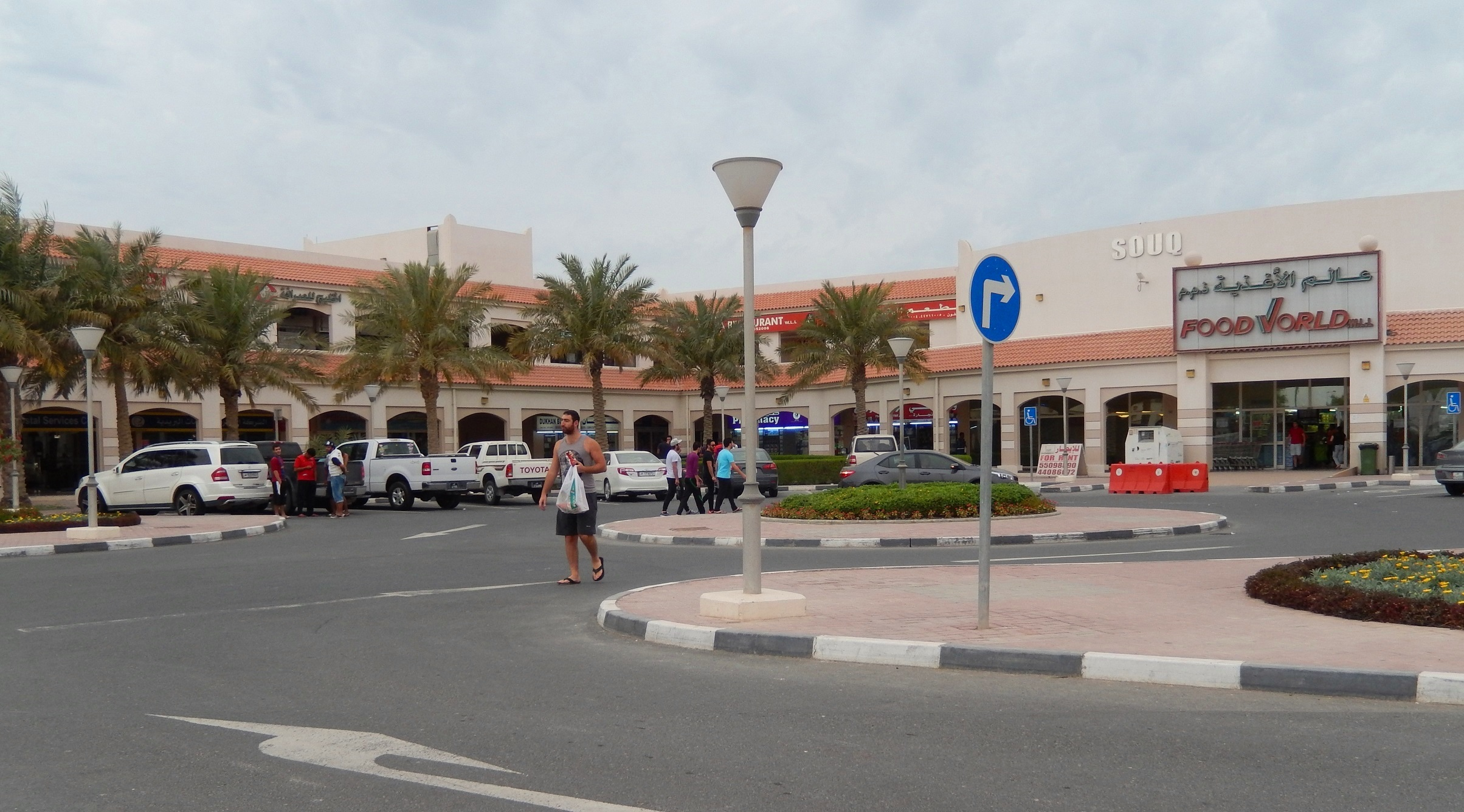
Shopping complex of Dukhan Souq

In the 1940s, communities started forming outside the camp in order to accommodate the increasing number of workers. The most notable community was that in the Khatiyah sector east of the camp. As an initiative to provide housing for Bedouins in the region, in the 1950s the government delegated Dukhan with the task of creating other settlements in the area. Two schools, several service buildings and additional settlements were built outside the camp in that decade. Some of these settlements include Al Zeghain, Afjan, Zekreet and Al Da'asa. The residential area doubled in size during that period.

In addition to housing and infrastructure, Dukhan also includes key service and commercial facilities that support daily life. Dukhan Souq, located near the Khatiya area, serves as a central marketplace and provides residents with access to shops, restaurants, a bank, a pharmacy, and a Q-Post office.

=== 21st century ===
The modern-day city of Dukhan evolved from the main oil camp and ensuing offshoot settlements that were established during the 20th century. In 2003, three billion Qatari riyal worth of projects were launched to develop the city. In 2012, a five-year development project on the city was announced by the chairman of QatarEnergy with a start date of 2013. The five-year development project was supposed to include a new school however, this plan was scrapped due to budget cuts brought about by falling oil prices.

In 2025, QatarEnergy signed a contract with Samsung C&T for the construction of a large-scale solar power plant in Dukhan. The project is expected to reach a total capacity of 2,000 megawatts and will significantly increase Qatar’s renewable energy production. This development highlights Dukhan’s growing importance in Qatar’s shift toward renewable energy and supports the country’s broader sustainability goals. The city continues to play a role in national energy planning and industrial development.

== Geography ==
Dukhan is in the municipality of Al-Shahaniya and is approximately 84 kilometres (52 mi) from the capital Doha.

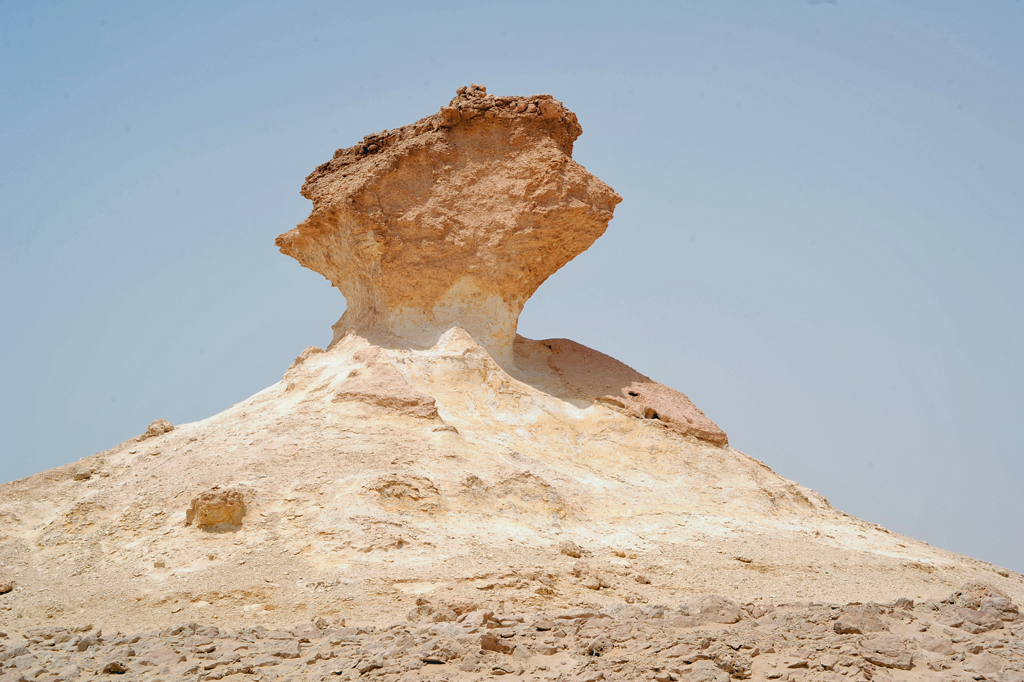
A mushroom-shaped erosional rock formation in Dukhan

The southeasternmost section of the area is 60 metres (200 ft) above sea level. Parts of Dukhan's sabkha zone in the north are several metres below sea level. The coastal region contains parallel formations of Eocene limestone, forming a series of low hills. The top of the Rus Formation from the Lower Eocene period outcrops more than 25 metres (82 ft) in this area. The eastern portion comprises a lowland covered with rock fragments, consisting of wadis and vegetation-rich depressions (known as rawdas). Wadi Diab is one of the major dry riverbeds which extend through Dukhan.

The Dukhan area has varied landforms and is considered one of the five main regions of Qatar. Its width varies from about 3 kilometres (1.9 mi) in the north to 19 kilometres (12 mi) in the center and 6 kilometres (3.7 mi) in the south. The total length of the Dukhan region is approximately 87 kilometres (54 mi). Ras Abrouq serves as the northern boundary while An Nakhsh serves as the southern boundary.

A sabkha (a type of salt flat) ecosystem known as the Dukhan Sabkha is found in the northern section. This sabkha, considered the largest inland salt flat in the Persian Gulf, runs for approximately 20 kilometres (12 mi), occupies an area of 73 km^{2} (28 sq mi), has a width of 2 kilometres (1.2 mi) to 4 kilometres (2.5 mi) km and a depth of between 6 metres (20 ft) and 7 metres (23 ft). It also accommodates the lowest point of Qatar, at 6 metres (20 ft) below sea level. Due to its high uranium content, the sabkha has elevated levels of radioactivity, with measurements ranging from 16 to 75 cps. The sabkha is fed by seawater from the Bay of Zekreet, approximately 3 kilometres (1.9 mi) north. A depression known as Rawdat Jarrah is the midpoint between the Bay of Zekreet and the sabkha; geologists have theorized that it may have been an extension of the bay as early as 3,000 years ago.

In a 2010 survey of Dukhan's coastal waters conducted by the Qatar Statistics Authority, it was found that its average depth was 5 meters (16 ft) and its average pH was 8.1. Furthermore, the waters had a salinity of 64.40 psu, an average temperature 23.5°C and 6.77 mg/L of dissolved oxygen.

=== Jebel Dukhan ===
Jebel Dukhan is a range of uniquely shaped hills varying from 100 feet (30 m) to 300 feet (91 m) above the level of the surrounding country, the surface being light sandy soil with a lot of loose stone.

=== Dukhan anticline ===
The Dukhan Oil Field is situated on the Dukhan anticline, a group of folds which runs in a north northwest to south southeast direction parallel with the western coast. The Dukhan anticline, with its thin lengthened structure and moderately steep dips stands out from the greater part of the neighboring folds. This has prompted some geologists to associate its formation with deep-seated salt movement. The overall length of the anticline is roughly 80 kilometres (50 mi) above the lowest closing contour. Jebel Nakhsh lies at the southern boundary of the anticline. The Dukhan anticline demonstrates a range in the extremity of folding along its length, with the folding of the northern part being more pronounced than the southern.

=== Wildlife ===
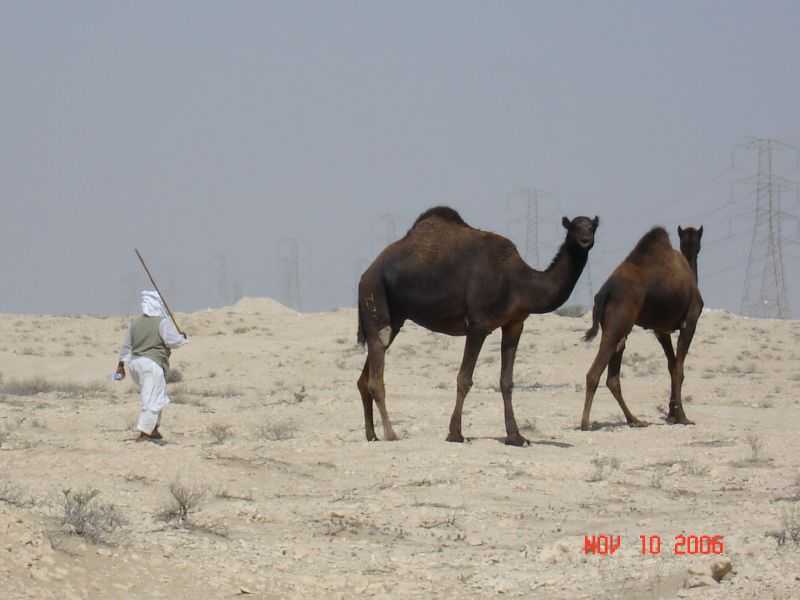
A Bedouin herding his camels in Dukhan, photographed in 2006

Pastoralism has historically been dominant among the nomads of the area as many areas of Dukhan offer suitable grazing territory for camels. Once oil activities commenced, grazing camels often suffered ill-effects from oil pollution and litter. Some camels unknowingly consume residue and waste material left over from oil extraction and become sick. Furthermore, camels may come into contact with sensitive infrastructure, such as switches for oil wells and fences. Incidents have been recorded of camels causing leakages in oil wells, turning off oil wells and injuring themselves on such installations. It was reported in 1992 that oftentimes, camels crossing the roads around Dukhan were the cause of fatal motor accidents, particularly at night. In the early days of Dukhan's oil operations, livestock owners would be compensated by QatarEnergy for any incidents resulting in the death of their camels, however, this precedent was overruled in 1985, with the new official position stating that pastoralists were to be held responsible for their livestock.

Common flora in the area used for livestock grazing include zygophyllum qatarense, vachellia tortilis, blue-stem grass (Hyparrhenia hirta), and gazelle's horn (Lotus halophilus), which grows in depressions. Near Jebel Dukhan, plants found here include athl (Tamarix aucheriana) Arabian primrose (Arnebia decumbens), shabraq (Ononis reclinata), qartam barie (Carthamnus eriocephalus), and ghebayra (Herniaria hirsuta).

Qalam (Arthrocaulon macrostachyum) grows in salt marshes. Torba (Silene conica) occurs rarely on the side of the highway. Desert thumbs (Cynomorium coccineum) and marsh fleabane (Pluchea dioscoridis) commonly grow around the sewage water treatment plant.

Other common vegetation found in Dukhan include buck's horn plantain (Plantago coronopus), eyelash plant (Blepharis ciliaris), jebira (Bassia muricata) on compressed gypsum soils, reeds (Phragmites australis) in wet areas, halaq (Astragalus annularis), raqrouq (Helianthemum kahiricum), lebena (Euphorbia peplus), tiny bristle grass (Rostraria pumila) in lawns and gardens, kebaisha (Erodium glaucophyllum), samah (Mesembryanthemum cryptanthum), woolly-winged milkwort (Polygala erioptera) and marak (Leptadenia pyrotechnica) near the coast.

The buffer zone of the Al Reem Biosphere Reserve starts at a point slightly north of the city.

=== Climate ===
The following is climate data for Dukhan obtained from the Qatar Statistics Authority. Dukhan has a hot arid climate (Koppen: BWh).

Climate data for Dukhan
Month	Jan	Feb	Mar	Apr	May	Jun	Jul	Aug	Sep	Oct	Nov	Dec	Year
Mean daily maximum °C (°F)	22.5 (72.5)	25 (77)	30 (86)	36 (97)	42 (108)	44 (111)	45 (113)	44.5 (112.1)	41.5 (106.7)	37 (99)	30 (86)	23.5 (74.3)	35.1 (95.2)
Mean daily minimum °C (°F)	15 (59)	16.5 (61.7)	20 (68)	25 (77)	30 (86)	32.5 (90.5)	34 (93)	33.5 (92.3)	32 (90)	26.5 (79.7)	23.5 (74.3)	17 (63)	25.5 (77.9)
Average precipitation mm (inches)	10 (0.4)	2 (0.1)	2.5 (0.10)	6 (0.2)	1 (0.0)	0 (0)	0 (0)	0 (0)	0 (0)	0.5 (0.02)	13 (0.5)	19.5 (0.77)	54.5 (2.09)
Average relative humidity (%)	68	67	63	58	53	54	57	63	67	70	75	82	65
Source: Qatar Statistics Authority

== Visitor attractions ==
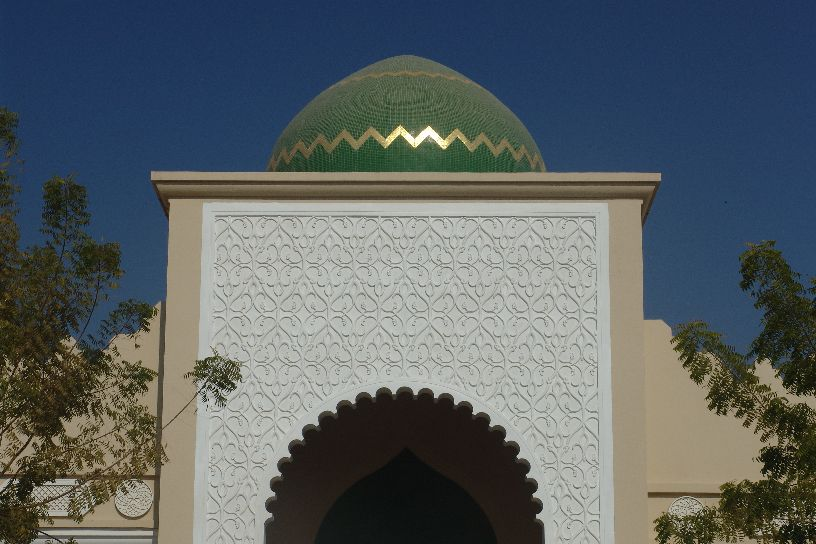
Dukhan Masjid

=== Historic landmarks ===
Al Khotba Mosque, erected in 1942, is one of the oldest mosques in the region. Planned shortly after the oil camp was established, it is noted for its unique decorative elements. The minaret, situated in the north-east section, lies on a square base and is barrel-shaped. An outdoor prayer area is accessible through six pathways in the courtyard, while the prayer hall has three entrances leading from the outdoor area.

=== Recreational facilities ===
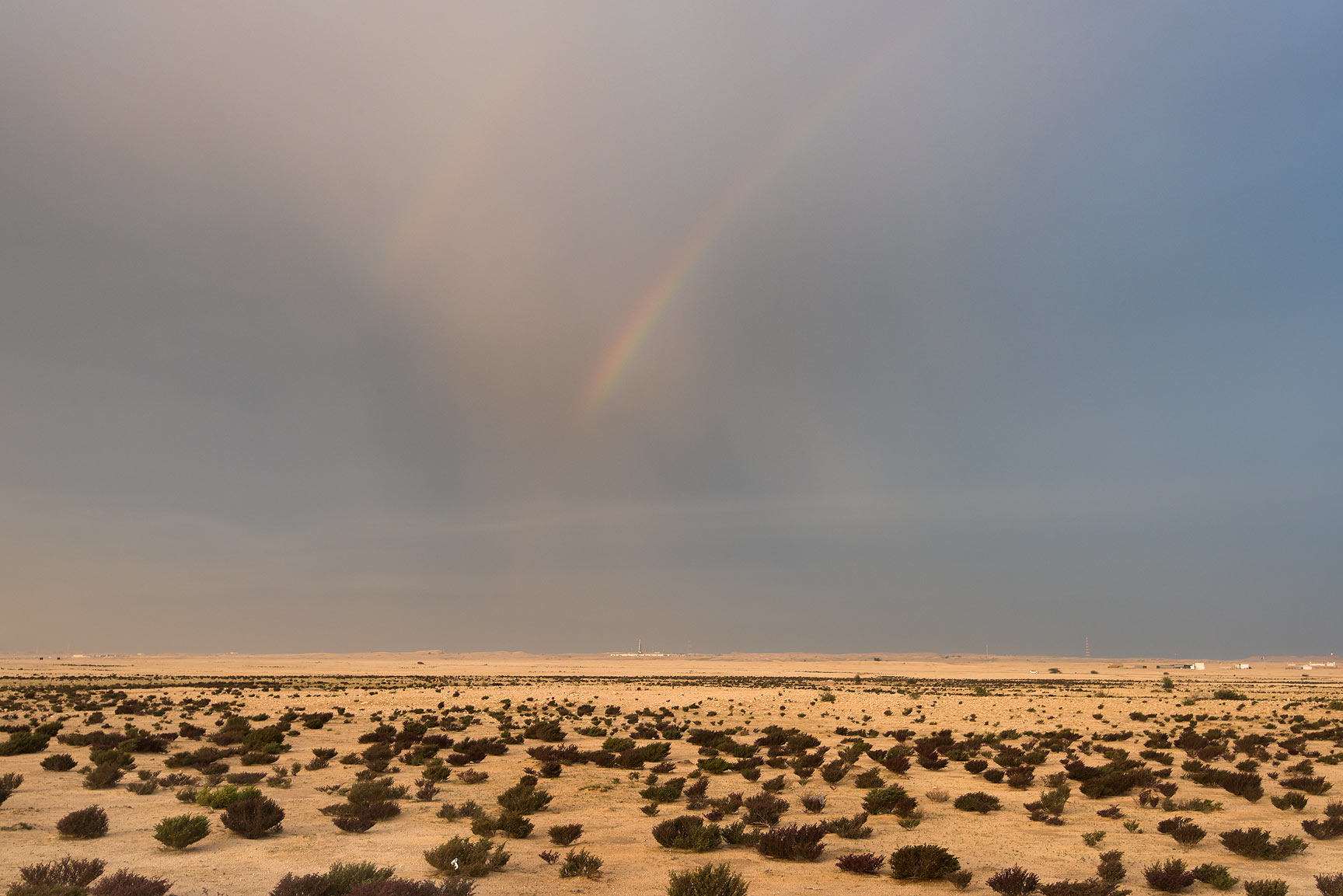
Rainbow in the Rawdat Jarrah depression north-east from Dukhan

Dukhan is served by several recreational facilities. One of the oldest recreation clubs in the city is Dukhan Recreation Club (DRC), known as Dukhan Fields Club until 1988. It has a swimming centre, a garden, a conference centre, a library, a sports lounge, and an indoor stadium. It hosts several community functions, such as the yearly Dukhan Women's Association handicraft exhibition, school events and sports events.

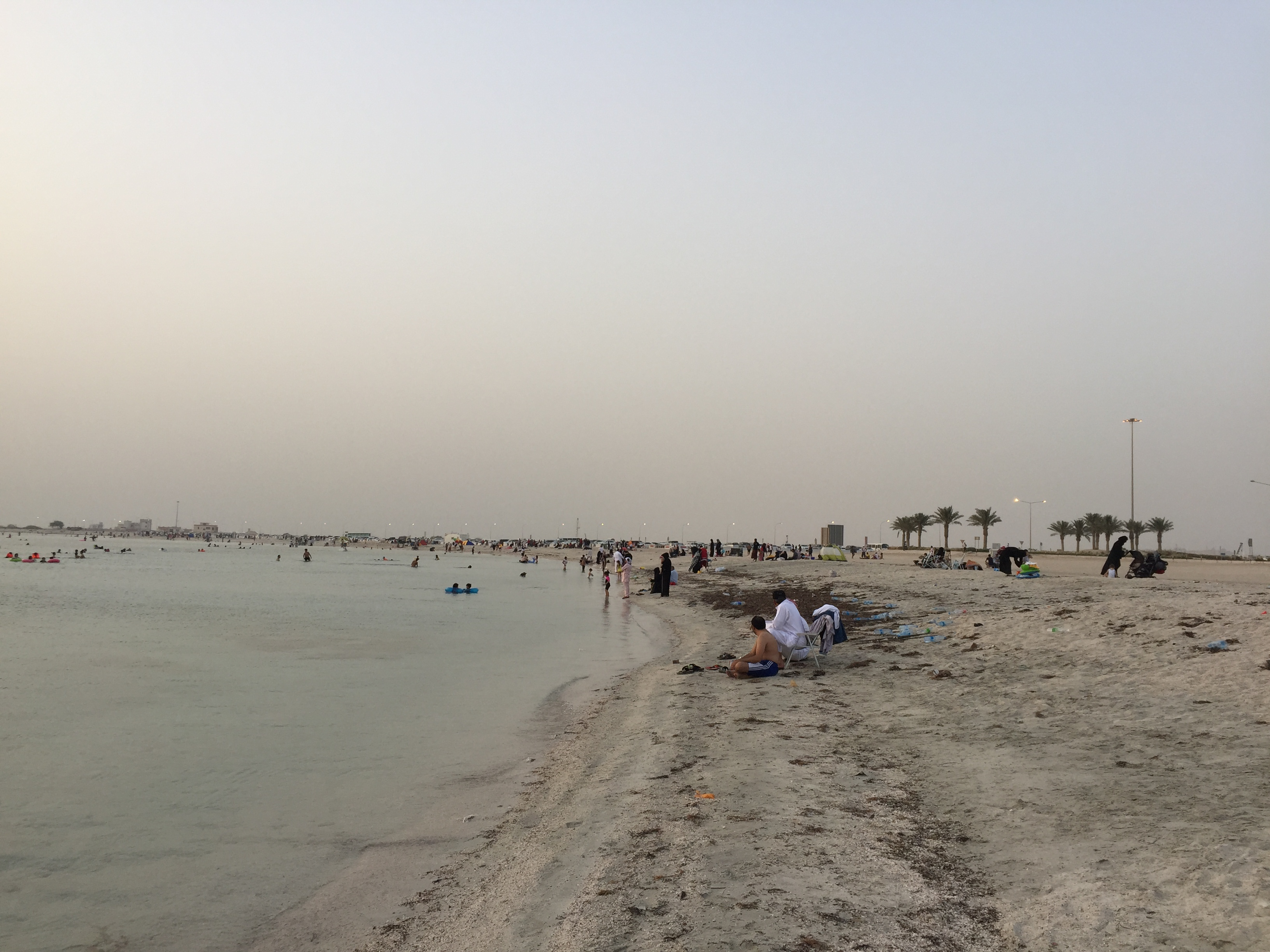
Dukhan public beach

Jinan Recreation Club serves the city as a multi-recreational facility. It contains a library, a party hall, numerous sports facilities, and a cinema.

A fitness club exists in the city, but it is exclusive to QatarEnergy employees. Facilities are gender-segregated.

There is a water sports club in the community called Dukhan Water Sports (previously known as Dukhan Sailing Club). It was formed in the 1960s, and currently offers services such as powerboat sports, jet skiing and windsurfing. Events hosted by the club include an annual sailing regatta and an annual raft race. Dukhan also has a golf club; its facilities include a practice range, a lounge and a club house.

Dukhan Cinema opened in 1982. It has a seating capacity of 620 and features four weekly multilingual shows. It also facilitates community functions and drama classes for the Dukhan English School.

== Transport ==
=== Road ===
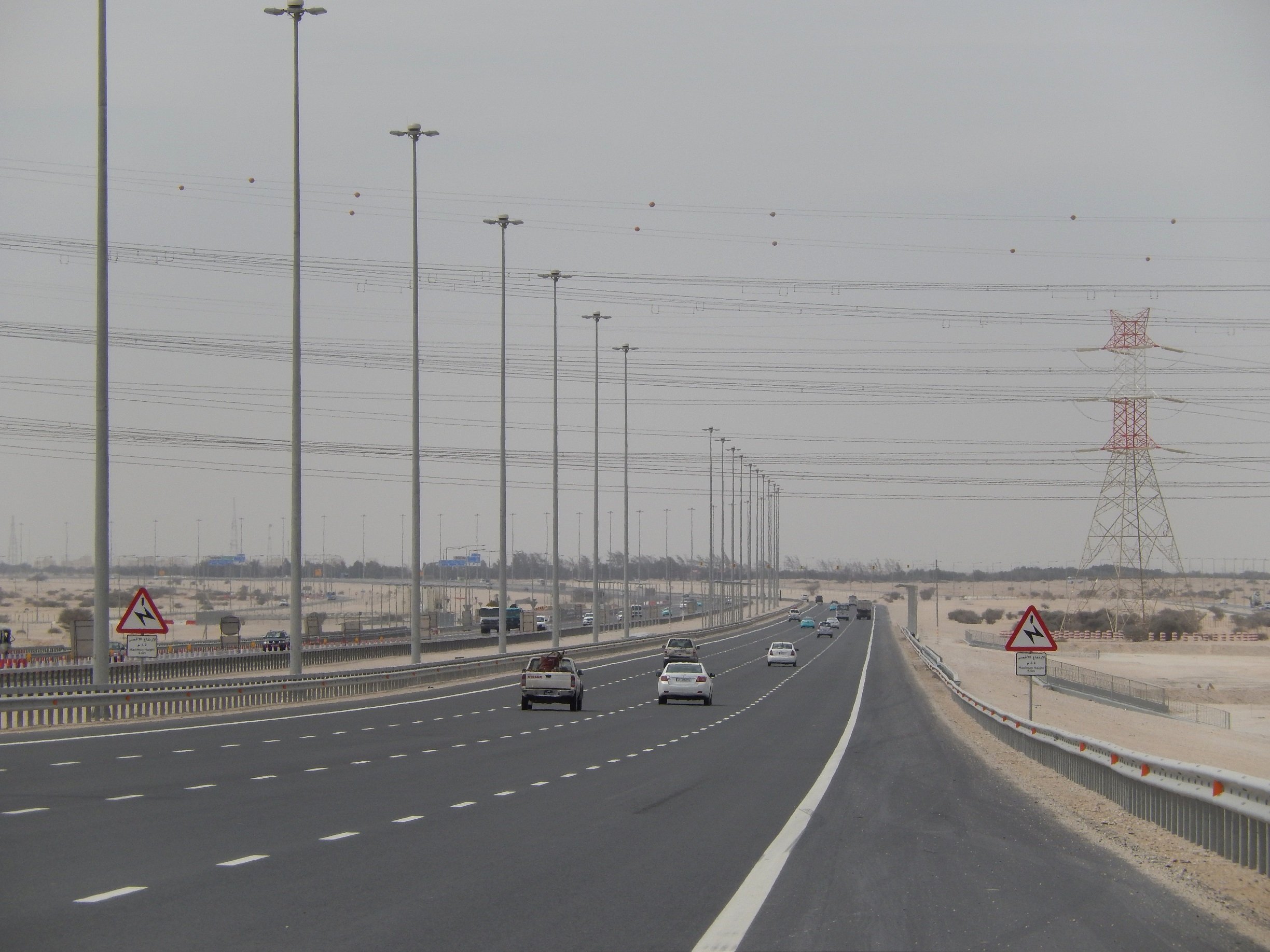
Dukhan Highway leading from Dukhan to Doha

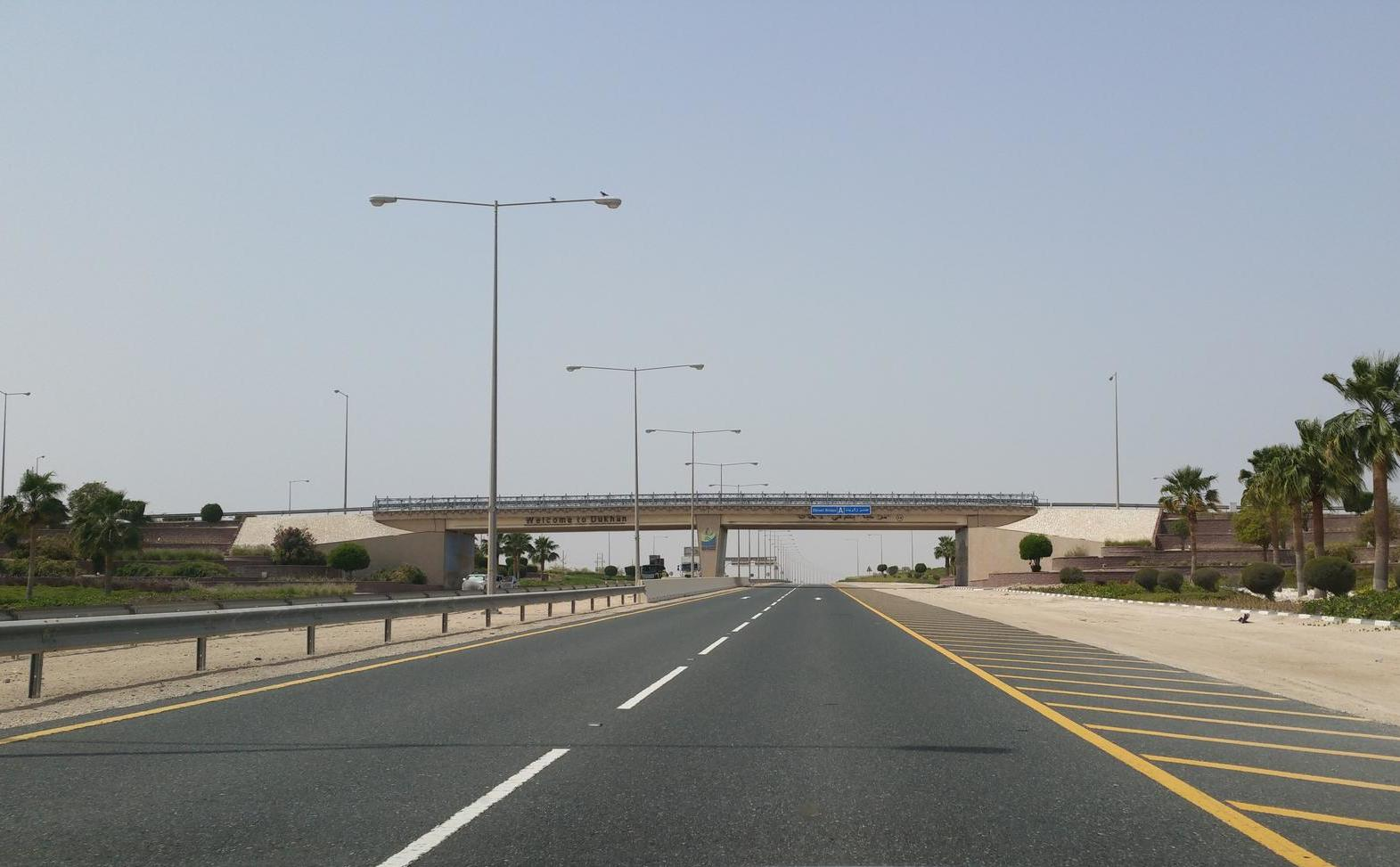
"Welcome to Dukhan" sign on Dukhan Highway

The first road in Dukhan was built in 1940 to connect the oil camp to Doha. Travel by car to the capital took approximately three hours. The only other form of transport to the capital at this time was by boat through Zekrit jetty, located 11 kilometres (7 mi) away from the camp. A second road was built in 1948 to connect Dukhan to Umm Bab and Mesaieed. In the 1970s, the Salwa Road was developed to link all four of the aforementioned areas. The total road system was 2.2 square kilometres (0.85 sq mi) by the 1990s.

In 2014, Dukhan Highway, the road linking Dukhan to Doha, was reconstructed by the Public Works Authority as part of a 384.5 million dollar project.

=== Air ===
Dukhan Airport, constructed in the late 1930s, was Qatar's first-ever airport but was eventually made obsolete by the Doha International Airport, opened in 1959. The airport grounds were left in ruins with some buildings (like the control tower) preserved. This airport is not related to the new Dukhan / Tamim Airbase, which was built in 2018.

== Healthcare ==
Healthcare services in the city are provided by Dukhan Medical Centre. It offers primary healthcare, occupational healthcare, and dental services. Additionally, a contractor clinic is located in the city. The Directorate Industrial Security, a subsidiary of QatarEnergy, is the primary occupational safety agency in the Dukhan.

The Cuban Hospital opened in Dukhan in January 2012 and provides health services mainly to the city of Dukhan, the town of Umm Bab and the village of Zekreet. The hospital has a capacity of 75 beds and over 450 Cuban staff members. The hospital is a joint initiative between the State of Qatar and the Cuban government. By providing medical services locally, it reduces the need for residents to travel to Doha for treatment. It also plays a key role in strengthening healthcare infrastructure in western Qatar and supports the country’s broader efforts to expand access to healthcare beyond major urban centers.

== Media ==
The community has two local publications: Dukhan Bulletin and Brooq Magazine.

== Archaeology ==
Dukhan is one of the most important Paleolithic sites in the peninsula. One of the largest bifaces in Qatar, measuring 35 cm (14 in)in length and 12 cm (4.7 in) in width, was previously recovered from Dukhan. In 1960, the largest Paleolithic flint chipping site at that time was discovered 5 km (3.1 mi) south of Dukhan, around 150 m (500 ft) from the shore. It covered 2.5 acres and contained an assortment of Stone Age implements such as arrowheads, blades, scrapers and hand axes. Camping grounds and flint tools were discovered in Ras Uwainat Ali, 10 km (6.2 mi) north of Dukhan. The archaeological sites of Ras Abrouq, Zekreet and Al Da'asa are also in the vicinity of Dukhan.

== Administration ==
When free elections of the Central Municipal Council first took place in Qatar in 1999, Dukhan was designated the seat of constituency no. 25. It would remain constituency seat in the next three consecutive elections until being transferred to constituency no. 24 and being replaced as constituency seat by Al Jemailiya in the fifth municipal elections in 2015. In the inaugural municipal elections in 1999, Hassan Mesfer Al-Hajri won the elections, receiving 48.8%, or 122 votes. Runner-up candidate was Jaber Hamad Rashed, who attained 32.8%, or 82 votes. Overall, voter turnout was 72.3%. The 2002 elections saw Mohammed Rashid Al Shahwani emerge as the new constituent representative. In the third municipal elections in 2007, Rashid Abdul Hadi Al-Hajri was elected as the representative. During the 2011 elections, Mohamed Faisal Al Shahwani polled the highest and won the elections.

== Education ==
The following schools are located in Dukhan:

Dukhan English School

Name of School	Curriculum	Grade	Genders	Official Website	Ref
Dukhan English School	International British	Kindergarten – Secondary	Both	Official website	
Dukhan Primary, Preparatory and Secondary Independent School and Kindergarten for Girls	Qatari National Curriculum	Kindergarten – Secondary	Girls-only	N/A	
Dukhan Primary, Preparatory and Secondary Independent School and Kindergarten for Boys	Qatari National Curriculum	Kindergarten – Secondary	Boys-only	N/A	

The Dukhan Learning Center is located on the city's outskirts. It was inaugurated in 2012 to provide various training programs for QatarEnergy employees. It also accommodates a library.

== Bibliography ==
- Abdul Nayeem, Muhammad (1998). Qatar Prehistory and Protohistory from the Most Ancient Times (Ca. 1,000,000 to End of B.C. Era). Hyderabad Publishers. ISBN 9788185492049.
