= Afjan (Qatar) =

Afjan عفجان
- Village
- Location in Qatar
- Coordinates: 25.287582°N 50.873986°E
- Country: Qatar
- Municipality: Al-Shahaniya
- Zone: Zone 86
- District no.: 633
- Established: 1970

Area
  - Total: 15.1 sq mi (39.2 km^{2})

Afjan (Arabic: عفجان) is a village in western Qatar located in the municipality of Al-Shahaniya. The city of Dukhan is to the north.

Two main sections define this village: Western Afja and Eastern Afja, the former village being the larger of the two.

== Etymology ==
Afjan is derived from the Arabic afja, a word used to describe a habitat similar to a sabkha (salt-flat) except for the fact that it is better suited to hosting vegetative life. Three afjas dot this area (from west to east): Afjan Al Gharbi, Afjan Al Wusti, and Afjan Al Sharqi. The village is located within the confines of the latter afja.

== History ==
The village was established in 1970 as a housing area for workers of the Dukhan oil fields. Like Al Zeghain to the north, Bedouins of the Manasir tribe and Bani Hajr tribe formed the bulk of its early inhabitants. Approximately 20 households existed in the village around 1990.
