= Cherry Hill and The Gallops, Barton Mills =

Protected area in Suffolk, England

Coordinates: 52.318°N 0.526°E

- Site of Special Scientific Interest
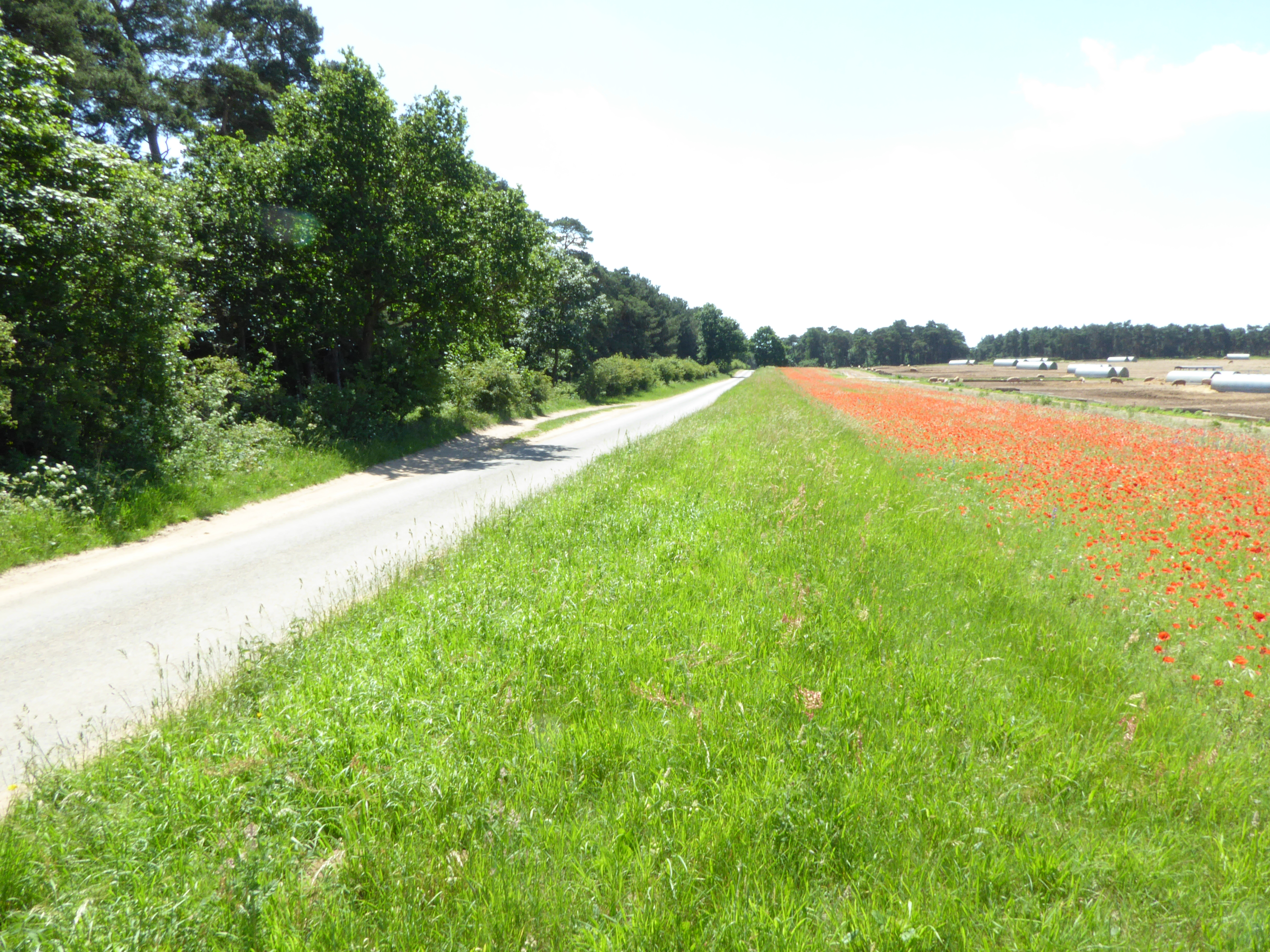
- Location of Cherry Hill and The Gallops, Barton Mills.
- Area of search: Suffolk
- Grid reference: TL 723 719
- Interest: Biological
- Area: 10.4 hectares
- Notification date: 1985
- Location map: Magic Map

Cherry Hill and The Gallops, Barton Mills is a 10.4-hectare (26-acre) biological Site of Special Scientific Interest south of Barton Mills in Suffolk. It is a Nature Conservation Review site, Grade 2.

This site consists of road verges which have calcareous grassland with four nationally rare plants, and two locally uncommon ones, sand catchfly and yellow medick. There is also a strip of pine plantation which has several rare insects.

There is public access to these roadside verges along stretches of Herringswell Road and Worlington Road.
