= Al Zeghain =

Al Zeghain الزغين
- Village
- Location in Qatar
- Coordinates: 25°18′0″N 50°52′0″E
- Country: Qatar
- Municipality: Al-Shahaniya
- Zone: Zone 86
- District no.: 634
- Established: 1950

Area
  - Total: 27.6 sq mi (71.5 km^{2})

Al Zeghain (Arabic: الزغين, romanized: Az Zughayn) is a village in Qatar located in the municipality of Al-Shahaniya. It is south of the city of Dukhan and north of Afjan. A spring called Ain Al Zeghain is near the village.

== Etymology ==
The literal translation from Arabic of zeghain is "armpit". This name was given to the area because its landscape resembles that of a pit crater.

== History ==
The village was established in 1950 as a housing area for oil workers employed in the Dukhan industrial city. Bedouins of the Manasir and Bani Hajr tribes formed the bulk of its first inhabitants. Around 20 houses existed in the village around 1990, with most of its working population employed in the oil industry. As there were no schools in the village, children received their schooling in the city of Dukhan.
