= Qatar National Cement Company =

Qatari cement manufacturer

- Native name: شركة قطر الوطنية لصناعة الاسمنت
- Type: Private
- Founded: 1965
- Headquarters: Doha, Qatar
- Website: www.qatarcement.com

Qatar National Cement Company is a cement manufacturer based in Umm Bab, Qatar. It was the first cement company established in the State of Qatar. The company claims to serve 70% of the local cement demands in the country.

== Location ==
The company is situated in Umm Bab in western Qatar. Umm Bab was selected as a result of the site being one of the two areas in the country where large quantities of limestone and clay can be easily excavated from.

== History ==
The cement industry in Qatar was initially planned in 1956, with a preliminary survey being conducted in 1963. Qatar National Cement Company was established in 1965 and was the first major non-oil industry to be commissioned in Qatar. It had a starting capital of QR5 million, and was one of the few industries to have had both private and public ownership. The government of Dubai was one of its first private stakeholders.

The first board of directors was appointed in its inauguratory year, with nine members overall. Two were government officials, one was an official from the government of Dubai, and six were founding members. The Dubai government official withdrew from the board in 1972.

In 1967, the company began installing its facilities. Its facilities were inaugurated in May 1969, with an annual production capacity of 100,000 tonnes. The government formed two departments for the company in 1976. One was for exporting cement, and the other was supervising cement sales within the country. Both departments proved to be ineffectual and were annulled shortly after. In 1980, the board was restructured, resulting in a greater representation of the Qatari government. As of 2010, the Qatari government owns 43% of the company.

== Facilities ==
Qatar National Cement Company's first facility was inaugurated in May 1969. Its second facility was constructed in 1974, and the third in 1976. A lime calcination plant was completed in 1978, with a capacity of 100 tpd. In 1985, a hydrated lime plant was established with a tpd of 240.

== Production capacities ==
In 1970, the daily production capacity was 271 tonnes. Its production capacity was not officially recorded prior to this year. The company's facilities were originally designed to produce only Portland cement, but demand soon grew to produce salt-resistant cement. In 1980, the daily production capacity stood at approximately 575 tonnes. As of 2015, the daily production capacity is 14,750 tonnes. The daily clinker capacity is at 11,900.
