= Dukhan English School =

Coordinates: 25°25′6.1″N 50°47′12.3″E

- The school field with the Specialist Block in the background
- Dukhan; Qatar

Information
- Type: Private international school
- Motto: Unity in Diversity, Trust and Partnership, Learning for Life
- Established: 1954
- Principal: Mr. Colter Stephen Watt
- Age: Nursery to VI Form
- Enrollment: 1400
- Language: English
- Accreditation: UCLES (secondary)
- Website: des.com.qa

The Dukhan English School is an international school located in Dukhan, Qatar, following the British Curriculum. The school serves students from 3 to 18 years old, catering mainly to families affiliated with QatarEnergy. It was established in 1954.
