= Dukhan Field =

Oilfield in Qatar

Coordinates: 25.4485°N 50.7874°E

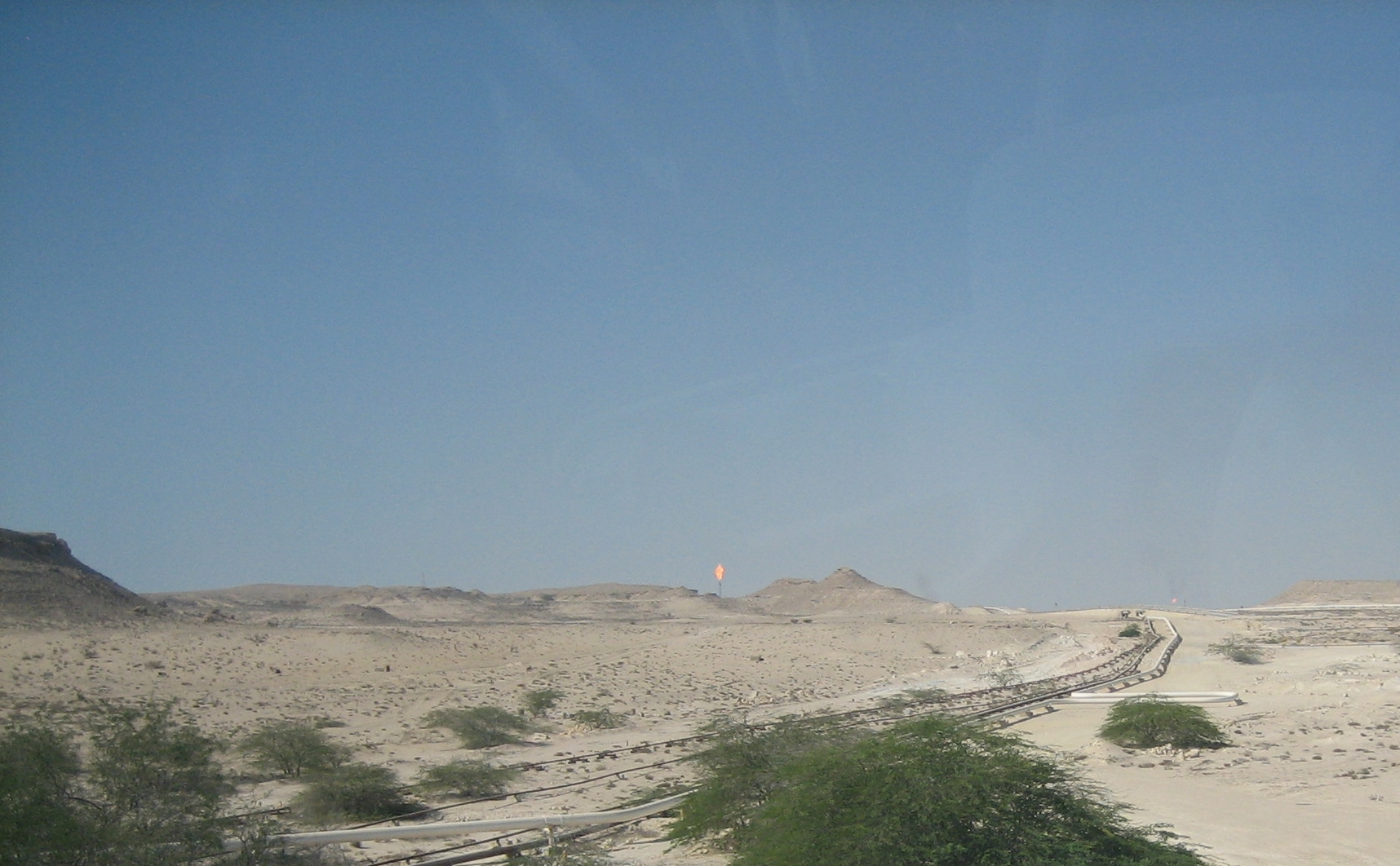
Pipeline system for Dukhan's oil wells. The gas flare of a petroleum refinery can be seen in the distance.

Dukhan Field is a large petroleum-producing field extending over an area of approximately 80 km in Dukhan, Qatar. The first well was drilled in 1939/1940 and the first export of petroleum from Dukhan went out in 1949. The field produces up to 335,000 barrels (53,300 m^{3}) of crude oil per day.

== Overview ==
The onshore Dukhan field, located along the west coast of the peninsula, is the country's largest producing oil field. The field is roughly 70 kilometres (43 mi) long and between 4 kilometres (2.5 mi) to 6 kilometres (3.7 mi) wide. It contains four reservoirs: Khatiyah, Fahahil and Jaleha/Diyab, three are oil reservoirs, and one contains non-associated gas. Oil and gas are separated in four degassing stations: Khatiyah North, Khatiyah Main, Fahahil Main and Jaleha. Stabilized crude is transported by pipeline to the Mesaieed port.

== History ==
Exploratory drilling was initiated in 1938 on the Dukhan anticline and, in 1939, the initial oil well was struck in the Number 3 Limestone of the Qatar Formation. Operations were put on hold temporarily in 1942 due to the Second World War but were resumed in 1947. In 1949, oil was discovered in two reservoirs of the Upper Jurassic Arab Formation known as Arab C and Arab D. On 28 March 1953, a massive fire erupted at well DK35, which was drilling the Arab-D reservoir.

== Geology ==
The Dukhan Field is situated on the Dukhan anticline, a group of folds which runs in a NNW to SSE direction parallel with the western coast. The Dukhan anticline, with its thin lengthened structure and moderately steep dips stands out from the greater part of the neighboring folds. This has prompted some geologists to associate its formation with deep-seated salt movement. The overall length of the anticline is roughly 80 km above the lowest closing contour. Jebel Nakhsh lies at the southern boundary of the anticline.

The Dukhan anticline demonstrates a range in the extremity of folding along its length; the folding of the northern part being more pronounced than the southern. Intricate mapping of the anticline was carried out in 1948–49.
