= Umm Bab =

Umm Bab أم باب
- Town
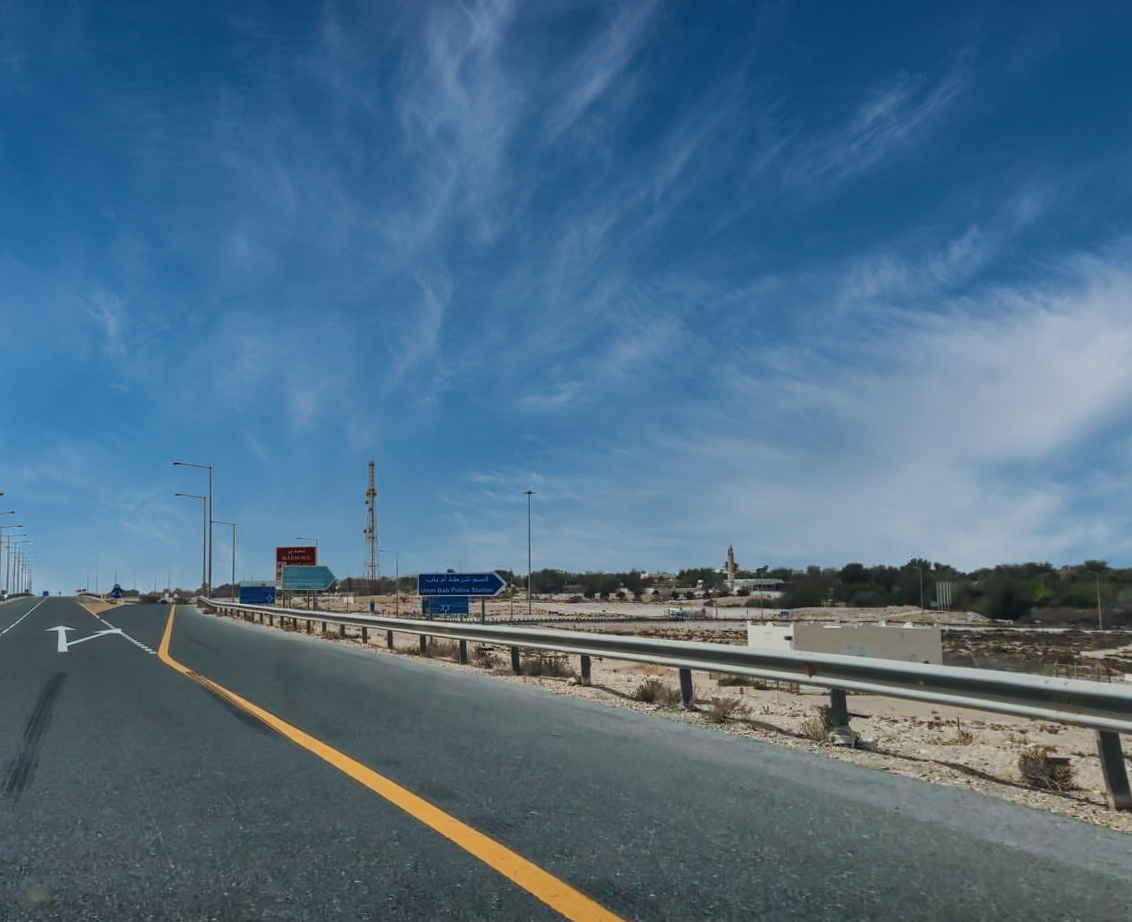
- Entrance to Umm Bab on Umm Bab Road

- Location within Qatar
- Coordinates: 25°12′35″N 50°48′48″E
- Country: Qatar
- Municipality: Al-Shahaniya
- Zone: Zone 84
- District no.: 559

Area
  - Total: 131.1 km^{2} (50.6 sq mi)

Umm Bab (Arabic: أم باب) is a settlement in western Qatar, located in the municipality of Al-Shahaniya. It used to be part of the Al Rayyan municipality and prior to that part of Al Jemailiya municipality before the latter was incorporated into Al Rayyan. Umm Bab is well known locally for Al Khraij Beach, which is also known as 'Palm Tree Beach' owing to a small cluster of palm trees situated off the shoreline.

Aside from accommodating Qatar's first major non-oil related industry in the form of a cement processing facility which began operation in 1969, there also exists minor oil and gas separation facilities within the settlement.

== Etymology ==
The settlement derived its name from local geographical features. Umm Bab translates to "mother of gateway". The "gateway" portion of the name refers to a narrow path or opening in the area surrounded by two small hills which resemble a gateway.

== History ==
In 1948, shortly after the commencement of oil drilling operations in Dukhan, a housing village was built to the immediate south of Umm Bab to accommodate both Qatar Petroleum workers and locals of Umm Bab. A road was built the same year to connect Umm Bab and Dukhan. In 1961, the government inaugurated a boys school in the village. The housing village had approximately 50 households and a population of about 1,000 by 1990, most of which belonged to members of the Al Murrah tribe who were employed by Qatar Petroleum.

== Geography ==
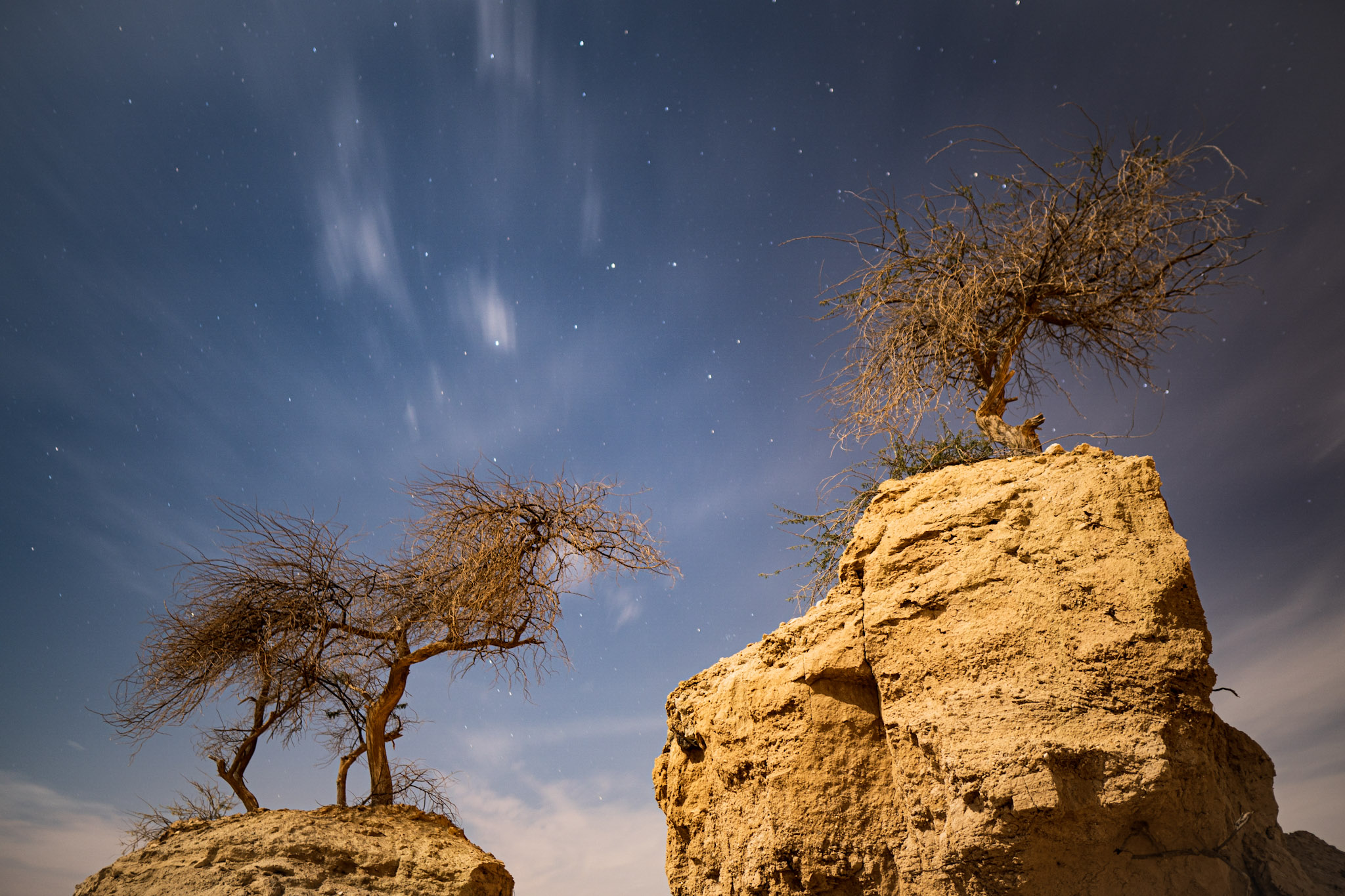
Umm Bab Clay Quarry at night.

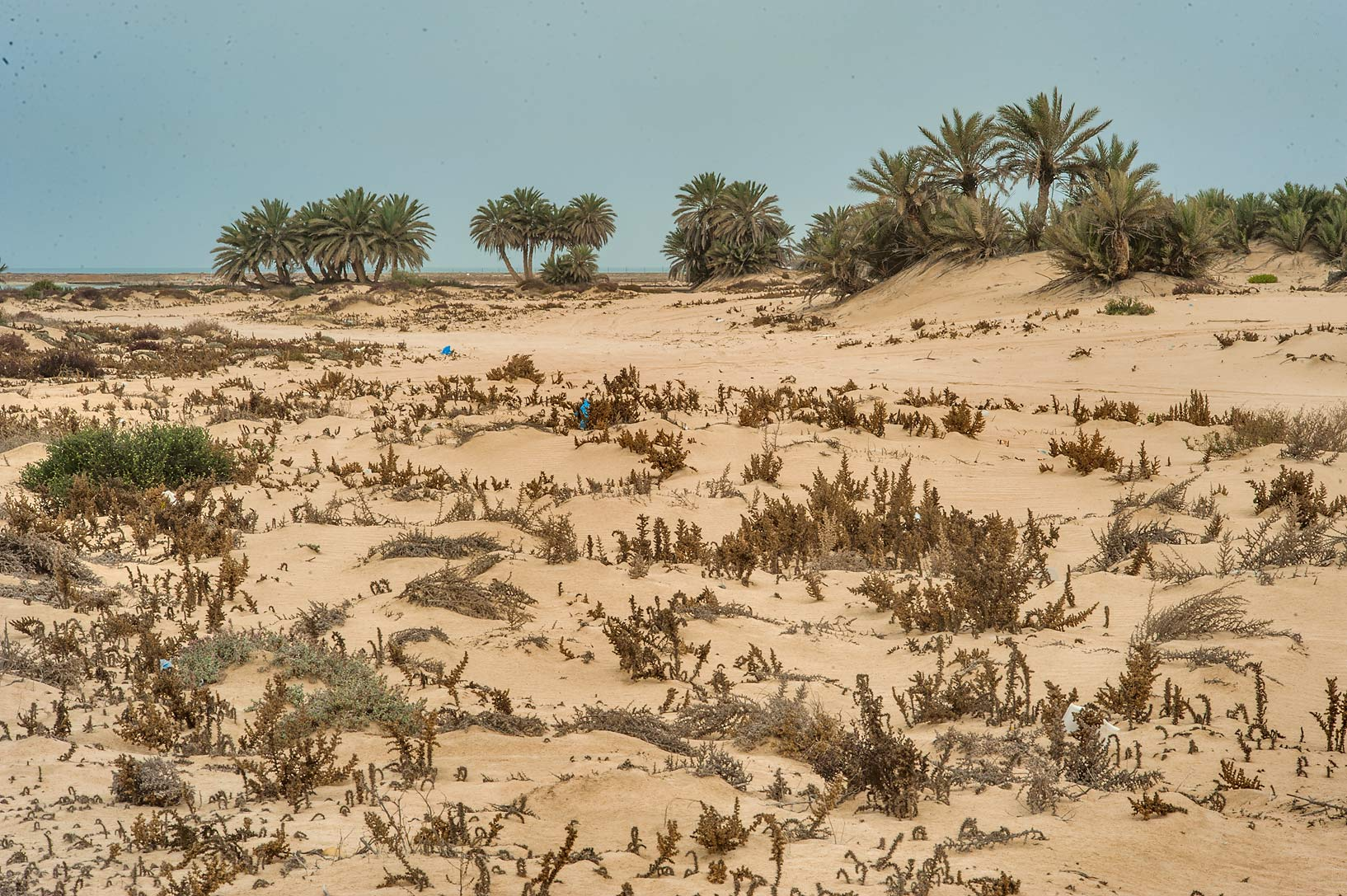
Beach sands in the vicinity of Al Hamlah Water Well near Umm Bab.

Situated in western Qatar, Umm Bab is only 25 km away from the industrial city of Dukhan. It is 85 km west of the capital of Doha, 142 km southwest of Al Khor, and 100 km northwest of Al Wakrah. The Aswan Quarries are to its southeast. Umm Bab is situated on the Dukhan anticline, a group of folds which runs in a NNW to SSE direction parallel with the western coast.

Common vegetation found in Umm Bab include date palms (Phoenix dactylifera) on the coast, alaqool (Alhagi maurorum) in disturbed sandy soils, arta (Calligonum comosum) in sand dunes, shawla (Reseda arabica), halaq (Astragalus annularis), qalam (Arthrocaulon macrostachyum) in salt marshes, torba (Silene conica) rarely on the side of the highway, hadh (Cornulaca aucheri), jalwa (Atractylis carduus), shajarat (Ifloga spicata), bagraa (Launaea mucronata), Pallenis hierochuntica, and Polycarpaea repens.

Inhabitants of the village of Umm Bab have aired their grievances to the government of negative health effects from living in such close proximity (within 8 kilometres (5.0 mi)) of the cement plant as a result of air pollution. Furthermore, much of the natural flora has been harmed by quarrying operations. At the clay quarry, about 20 kilometres (12 mi) south of the village, incomplete excavation has resulted in a series of small hillocks topped with lone trees surrounded by excavated earth.

== Infrastructure ==
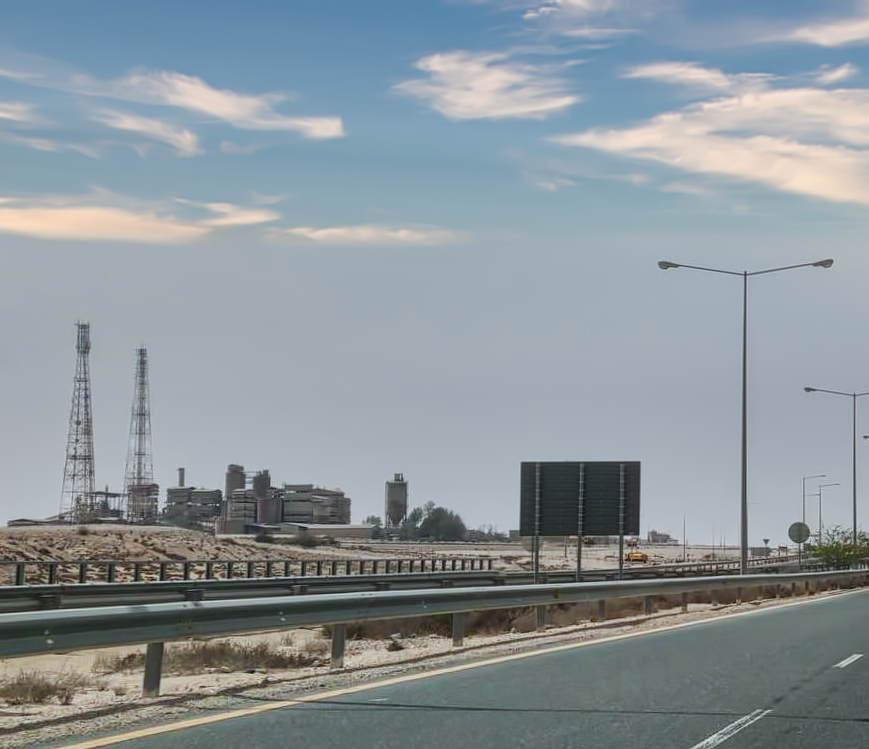
View of cement industries off Umm Bab Road.

The Umm Bab Coastal Center was opened in May 2017 by The Ministry of Interior's General Directorate of Coasts and Borders Security. Included within this center is a seaport, administrative buildings, and a boat maintenance shop. It is intended to serve as the primary coastguard station for the directorate's Western District.

Multiple police patrols are stationed in the area to protect the industry. This is for an initiative to implement better safety for campers and ensure they do not go to places which are closed off.

== Industry ==
Umm Bab is one of only two sites in Qatar from which large quantities of limestone and clay can be easily excavated, the other site being Umm Salal. Furthermore, north of Umm Bab is massive quantities of silica sand, which is used in the blending of cement and in construction. In 1965, the government capitalized on Umm Bab's rich natural resources by headquartering the Qatar National Cement Company in the area, approximately 8 kilometres (5.0 mi) north from the village of Umm Bab. This decision also served as an impetus to develop Qatar's western region.

The first processing of cement took place in 1969, and the factory received its water supply from Rawdat Rashed and its oil supply from Dukhan.

An 85 kilometres (53 mi) pipeline was built here in the 1940s, and in December 1949, it facilitated the first export of oil from Dukhan to Mesaieed.

== Transport ==
Concurrent with Qatar Petroleum's establishment of the housing village in Umm Bab in the late 1940s, the first paved road was built linking the village with Dukhan. In turn, the village was also connected to Doha through this same road. In the late 1970s, the government had launched multiple road construction projects, both to convert the road linking Dukhan and Doha to a dual carriageway and to construct a highway linking Umm Bab to Doha.

== Archaeology ==
The archaeological site of Asaila is near Umm Bab. It was discovered by a French archaeological team that surveyed and excavated several sites in Qatar between 1976 and 1982. By 1981, the team had excavated Asaila. This site was revisited by a joint German–Qatari archaeological team which was formed in 2012. The artifacts recovered at the site indicate a human presence during the early Neolithic period, c. 8,000 years ago. Several other archaeological sites have been discovered near Umm Bab.

In July 2018, a resident alerted archaeologists to the first inland rock art site in the country near Umm Bab. Rock samples were collected and are pending analysis on their dating.

== Gallery ==
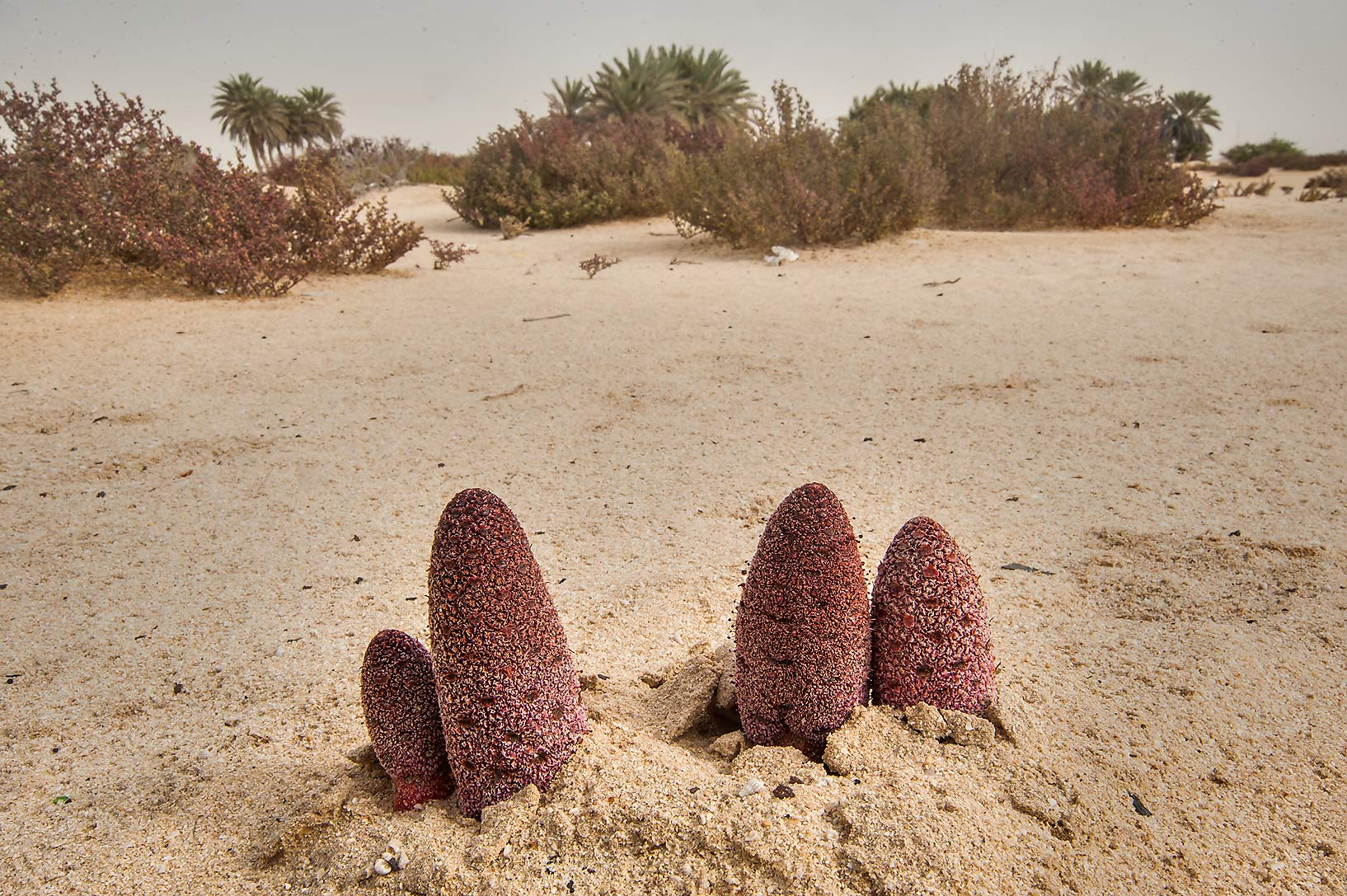
Desert Thumbs (Cynomorium coccineum, local name tartouth) on a beach near Umm Bab.

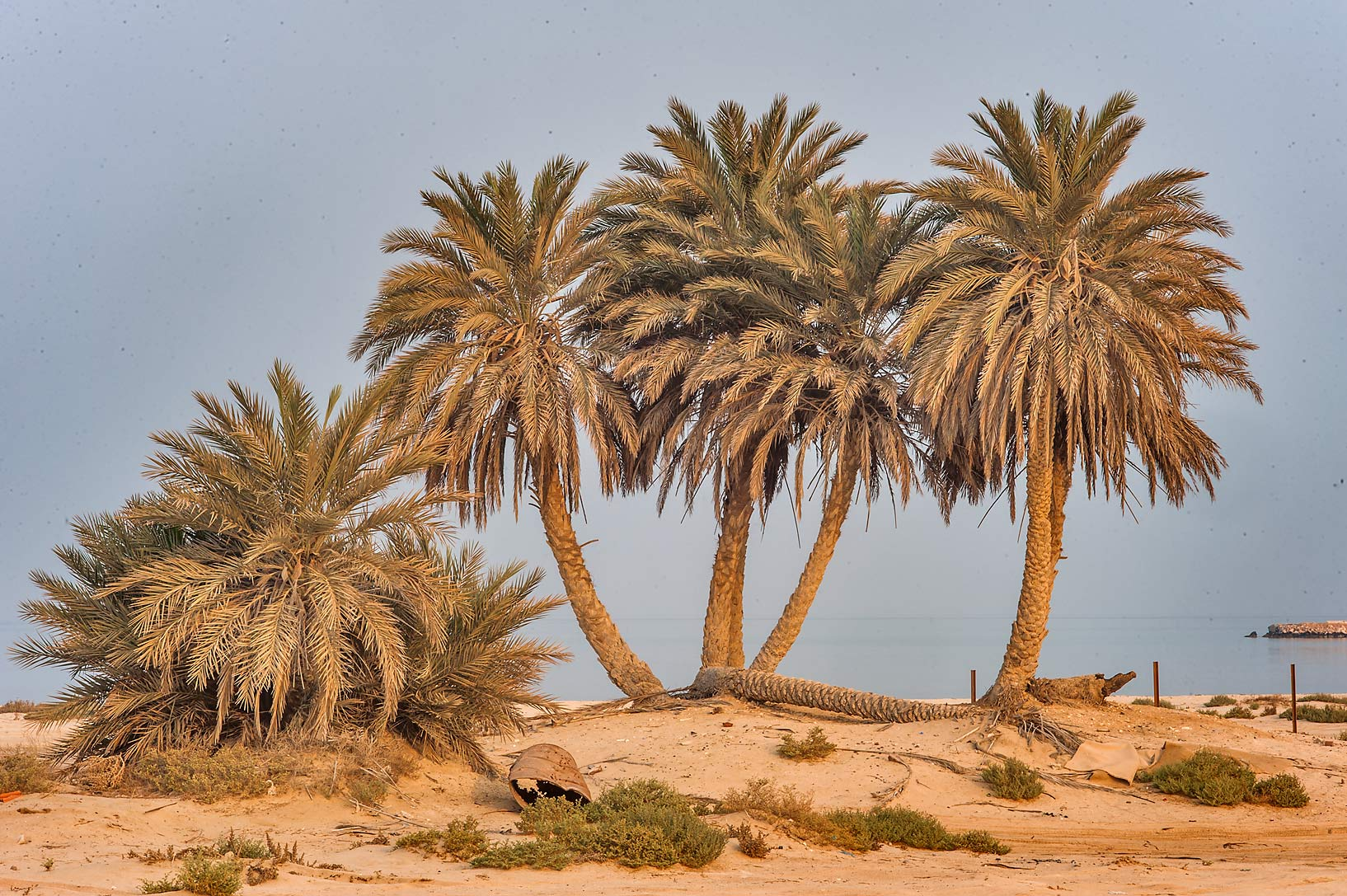
Cluster of palm trees near Umm Bab beach.

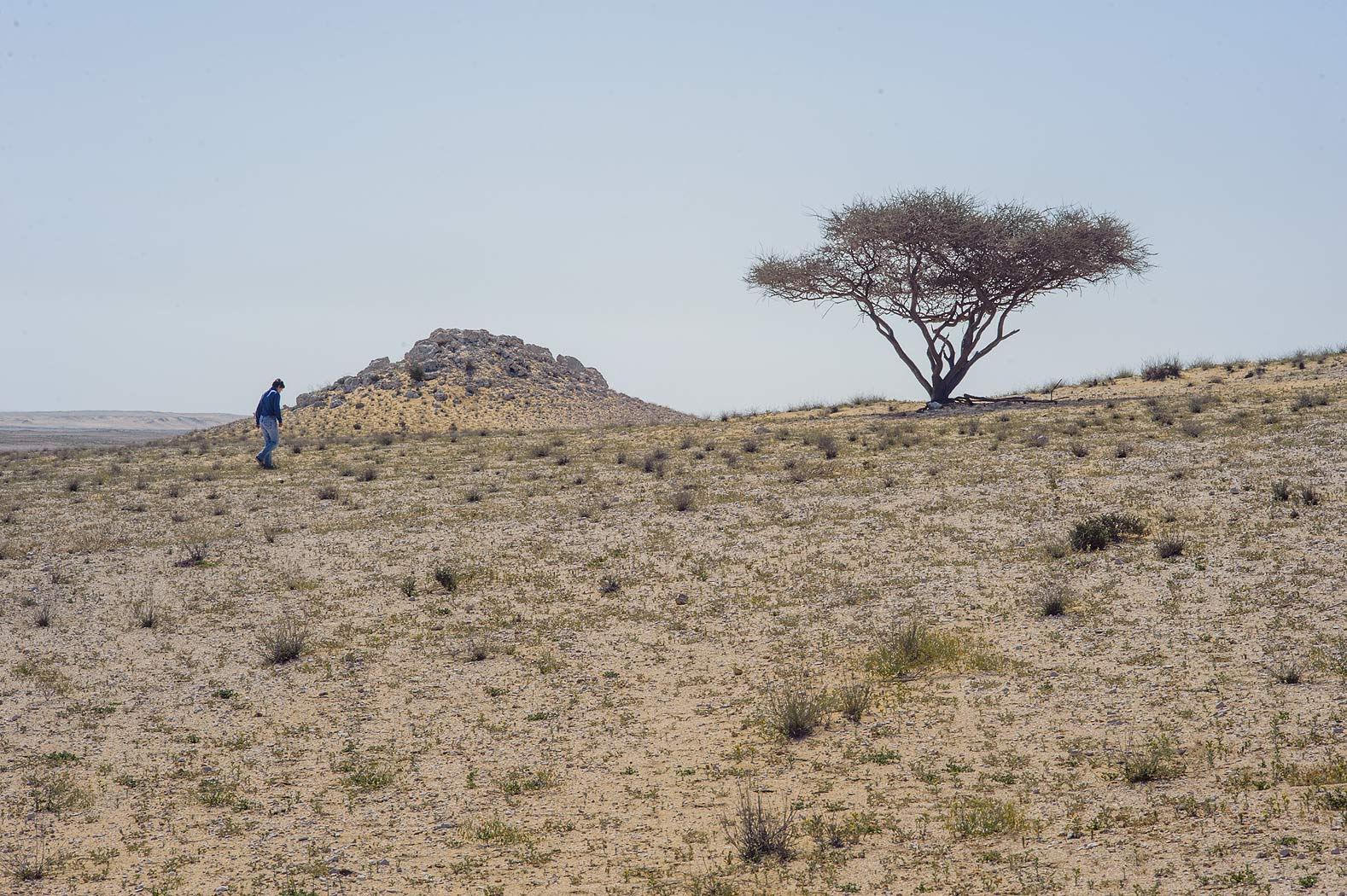
Rocky lightly vegetated desert south of Umm Bab with a single Acacia tortilis tree.
