= Jebel Nakhsh =

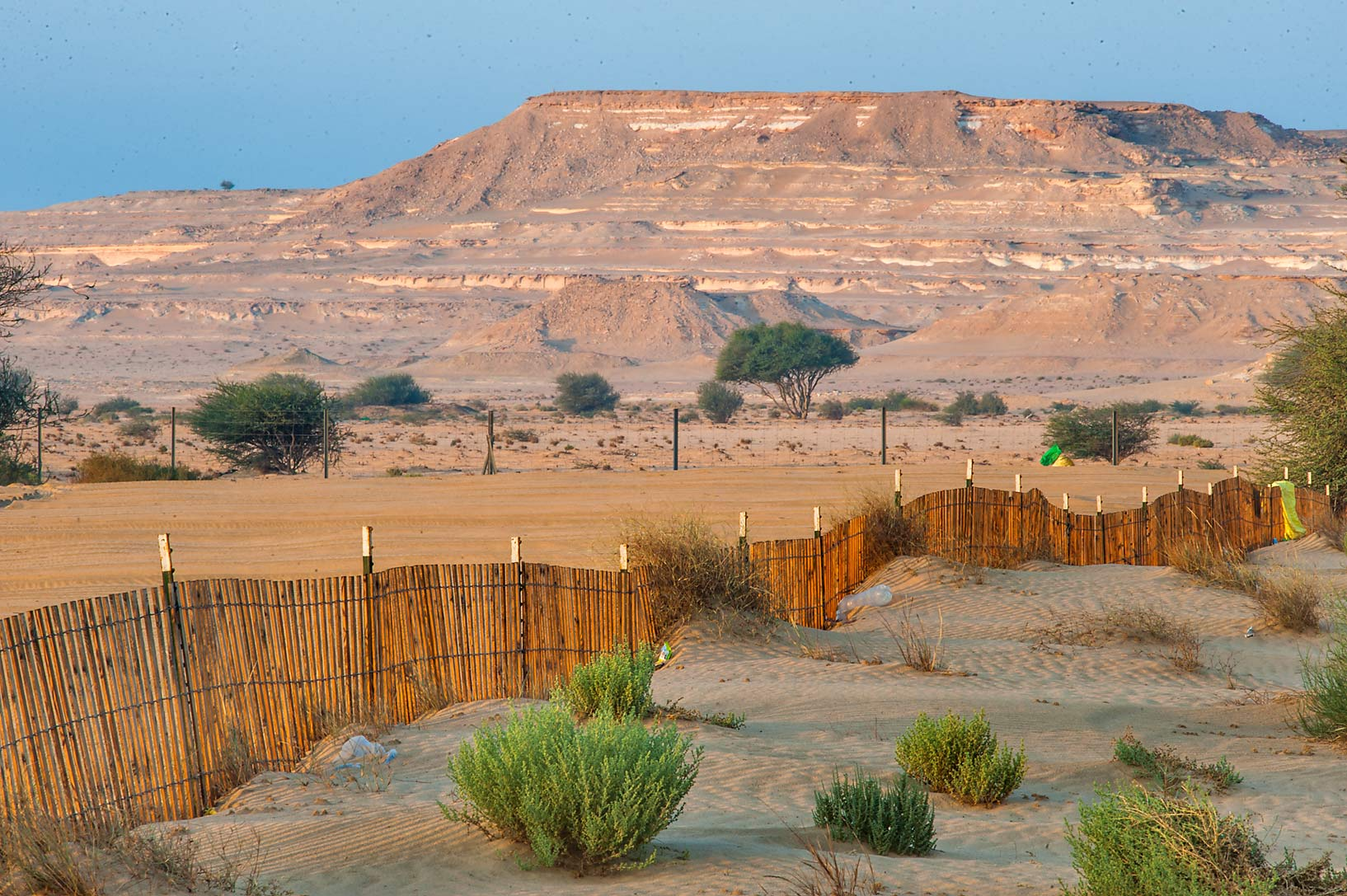
- Fenced-off area of Jebel Nakhsh

Highest point
- Elevation: 90 m (300 ft)
- Coordinates: 24°52′27″N 50°54′13″E

Geography
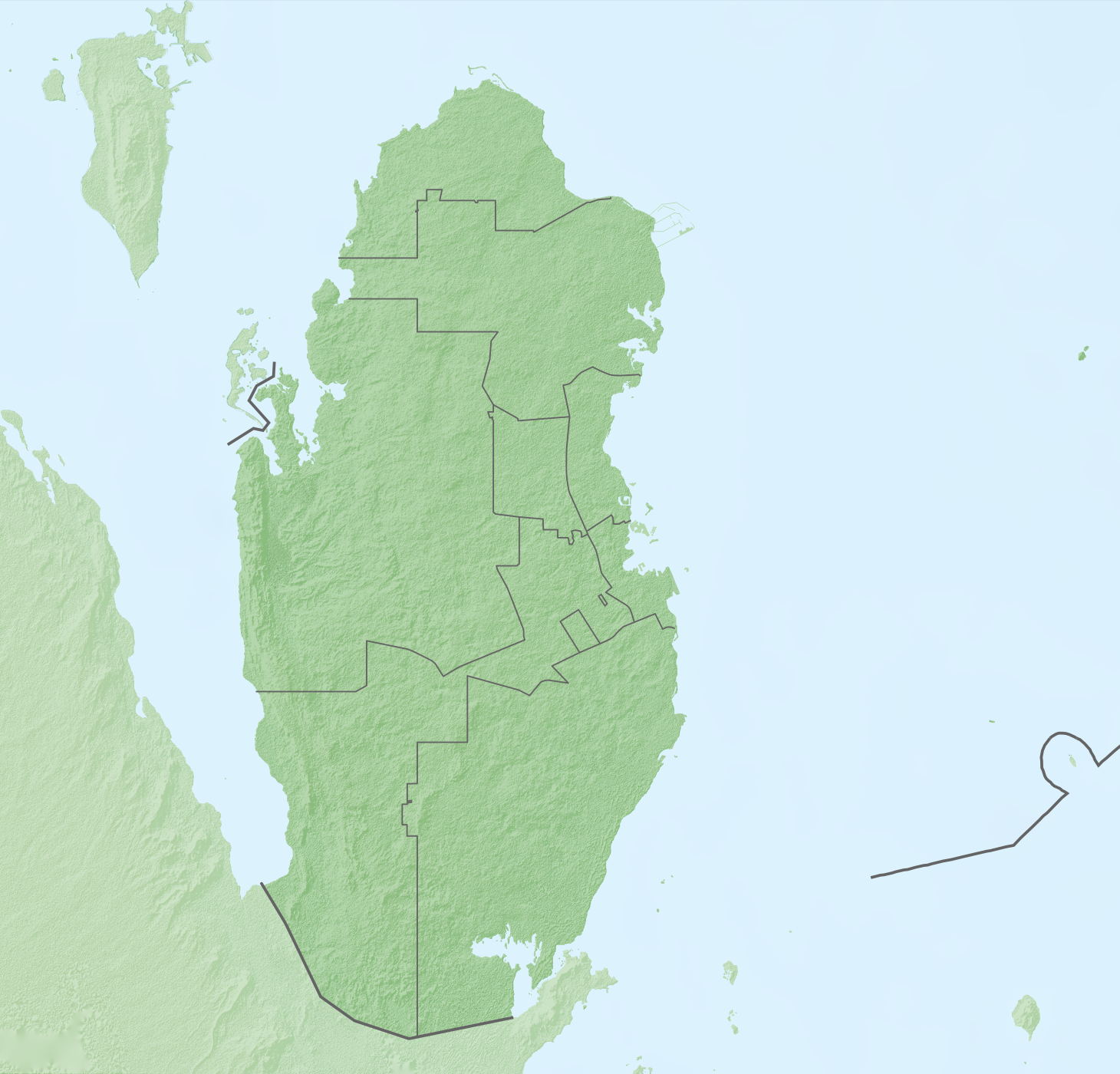
- Location within Qatar
- Location: Qatar

Geology
- Mountain type: Mountain ridge

Jebel Nakhsh (Arabic: جبل النخش; also known as Khashm Al Nakhsh) is a mountain ridge in southern Qatar that stands roughly 90 meters (300 ft) tall, and which runs southeast-to-northwest for 33 kilometres (21 mi) parallel with the western coast.

Three main rock layers make up the mountain: the bottom layer contains multiple burrows and is primarily composed of limestone, marl, and shale; the middle and largest is composed of limestone, marl, stromatolitic limestone and evaporites; and the top layer consists mainly of sedimentary limestone.

== Geology ==
The British, after surveying the mountain and sending samples to be tested in London in the summer of 1947, decided that it should be mined for gypsum. The Holloway Brothers were commissioned to oversee operations and to set up a mine railway to Umm Bab. A small labor camp was also established in the area. As much as 75 tons of gypsum had been quarried from the mountain by July 1948. The contract was later handed off to the C.A.T. Company, and by October 1948 the amount of gypsum extracted increased to 200 tons. From January 1949 to July 1949, a total of 420 tons had been extracted, and from August to the close of the year, 650 tons. Jacques Leblanc, a geologist working for QatarEnergy, notes that while the British report explicitly mentions Jebel Nakhsh, the mountain bears no apparent signs of exploitation and that it may be a case of mistaken identity.

The Miocene Dam Formation is the predominant formation of Jebel Nakhsh and of that formation, the three members exposed on the mountain's surface are the 6-meter thick Abu Samrah Member on top, 33-meter thick Nakhsh Member in the middle and the 27-metre thick Salwa Member on the bottom. The Nakhsh Member is very rich in gypsum and is the only member of the Dam Formation to contain stromatolites.

The bottom layer, largely made up of soft clays, is particularly fragile and chemical weathering of the clay surfaces has caused the underlying limestone to collapse in some areas, thus forming suitable abodes for certain desert mammals such as foxes and hyenas. There has also been instances recorded of mammals mechanically burrowing into these fragile surfaces. Its caves were first surveyed in 1983–84 by Peter Whybhrow.

Jebel Nakhsh is in southern Qatar and falls within the boundaries of Al Rayyan Municipality. It is near the border with Saudi Arabia to the south and the Gulf of Salwah to the west. The hill of Qarn Abu Wayil is approximately 2 km to the south.

== History ==
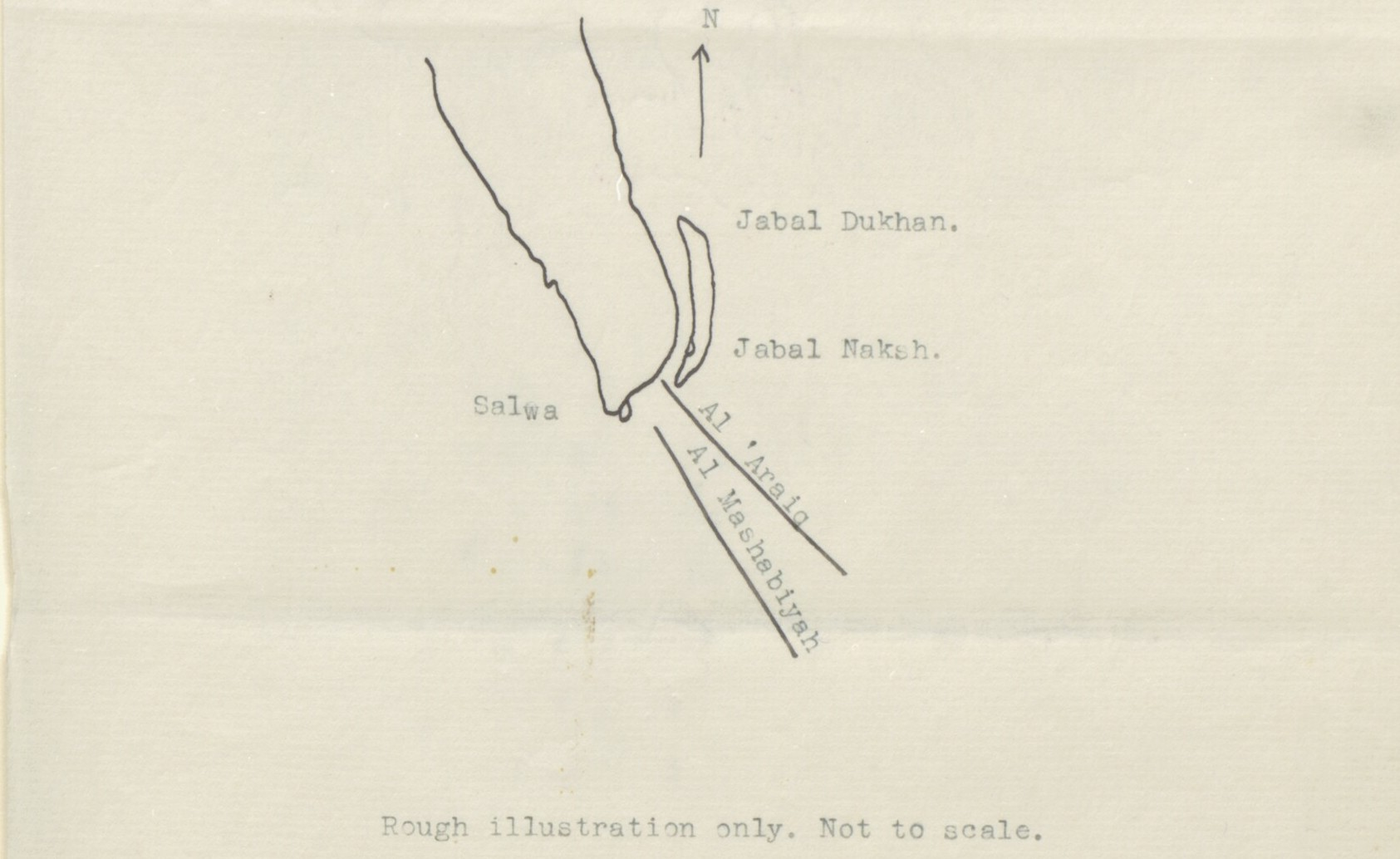
Rough sketch map drawn in 1936 showing Jebel Nakhsh

The jebel was a site of contention in the early-to-mid 20th century between Ibn Saud and Amir Abdullah bin Jassim Al Thani. Ibn Saud had wanted Jebel Nakhsh to be Saudi Arabia's frontier with Qatar. According to him, the Qatari Amir had previously signed an agreement ceding Jebel Nakhsh to him, although the Amir denied this. In a 1935 correspondence between British diplomats concerning the Saudi–Qatar frontier, the British claimed that "they [the Qataris] could never consent to attribute to Saudi Arabia features, such, for example, as the Jebel Naksh, which form an integral part of the physical structure of the Qatar Peninsula itself and have always, in fact, been an equally integral part of the Sheikhdom." In the following weeks, a British communique stated that they "could not agree to deprive the Sheikh of any portion of the main block of that peninsula".
