= Zone 86, Qatar =

Zone 86
- Zone
- Interactive map of Zone 86
- Coordinates: 25.389352°N 50.836163°E
- Country: Qatar
- Municipality: Al-Shahaniya
- Blocks: 57

Area
  - Total: 365 km^{2} (141 sq mi)

Population (2015)
  - Total: 13,274
  - Density: 36.4/km^{2} (94.2/sq mi)
- Time zone: UTC+03 (Arabia Standard Time)
- ISO 3166 code: QA-SH

Zone 86 is a zone in the municipality of Al-Shahaniya in Qatar. The main district recorded in the 2015 population census was Dukhan.

Other districts which fall within the municipality's administrative boundaries are Al Khattiya, Al Ruwais West, and Al Zeghain.

== Demographics ==
As of the 2010 census, the zone comprised 1,908 housing units and 147 establishments. There were 11,520 people living in the zone, of which 80% were male and 20% were female. Out of the 11,520 inhabitants, 83% were 20 years of age or older and 17% were under the age of 20. The literacy rate stood at 99.4%.

Employed persons made up 76% of the total population. Females accounted for 6% of the working population, while males accounted for 94% of the working population.

Year	Population
1986	3,341
1997	5,299
2004	6,117
2010	11,520
2015	13,274

== Land use ==
The Ministry of Municipality and Environment's breakdown of land use in the zone is as follows.

Area (km^{2})	Developed land (km^{2})	Undeveloped land (km^{2})	Residential (km^{2})	Commercial/ Industrial (km^{2})	Education/ Health (km^{2})	Farming/ Green areas (km^{2})	Other uses (km^{2})
365.01	5.04	359.98	0.45	0.12	0.29	0.33	3.85
