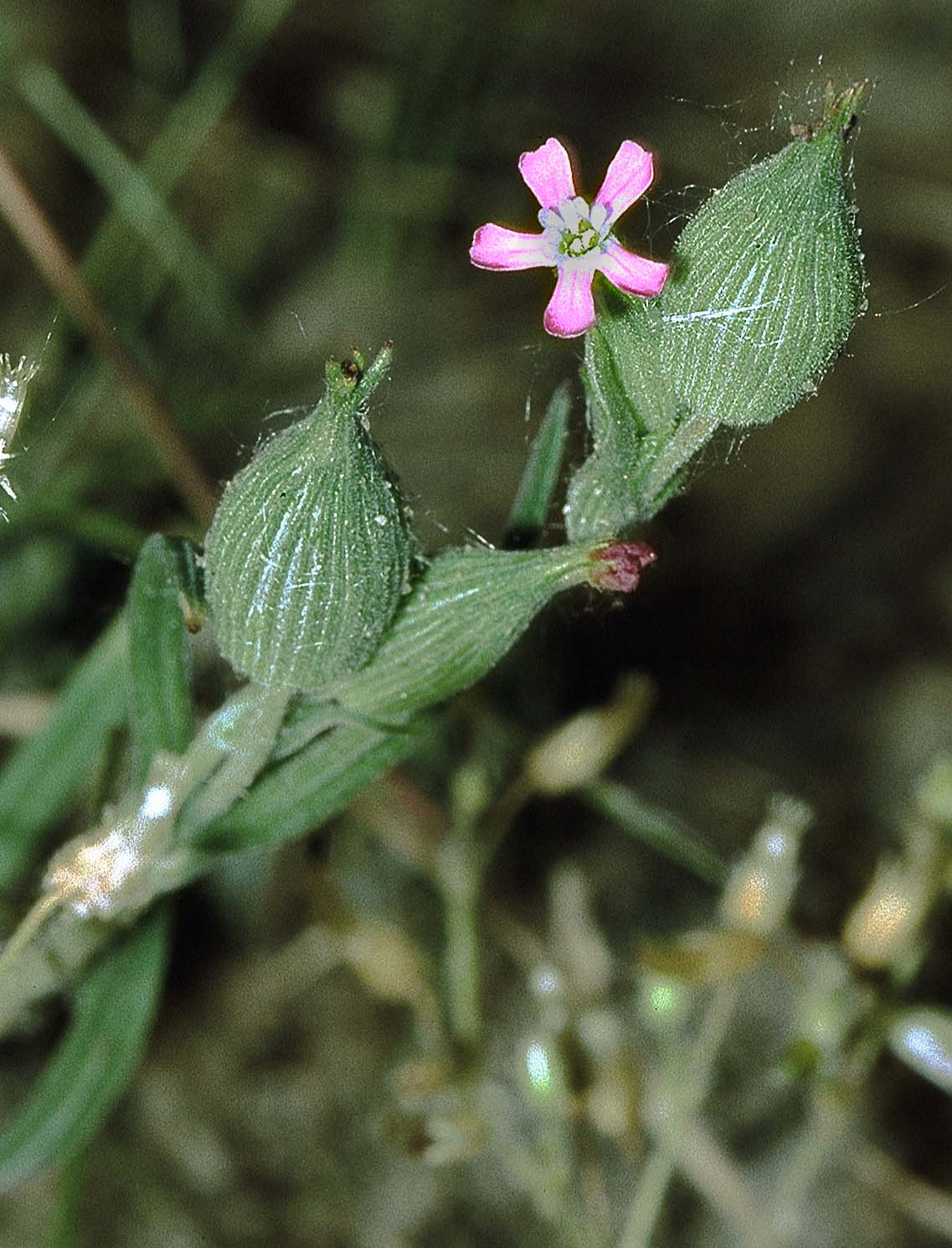

Scientific classification
- Kingdom: Plantae
- Clade: Tracheophytes
- Clade: Angiosperms
- Clade: Eudicots
- Order: Caryophyllales
- Family: Caryophyllaceae
- Genus: Silene
- Species: S. conica

Binomial name
- Silene conica L.

= Silene conica =

Species of flowering plant

Silene conica is a species of flowering plant in the family Caryophyllaceae known by the common names striped corn catchfly and sand catchfly. It grows in dunes and sandy soils and is widespread in Europe and western Asia. It has an annual life history and produces self-compatible hermaphroditic flowers and occasional male-sterile flowers (i.e., gynomonoecy). Like other members of Silene section Conoimorpha, S. conica is readily recognizable based on its bright pink petals and the prominent, parallel veins on its calyx. In contrast to most flowering plants, S. conica appears to have a very rapid rate of mitochondrial mutation, and has the largest mitochondrial genome (11.3 Mb) ever identified.
