= List of schools in Qatar =

There are approximately 338 international schools operating in Qatar. The following are both national and international schools in Qatar (arranged in alphabetical order). (Tertiary schools are presented in the separate list of universities and colleges in Qatar.)

== A ==
Name of school	Location	Curriculum	Grade	Genders	Official website	Ref.
Abdulla Bin Turky Model Independent Boys	Al Aziziya	Independent	Kindergarten – Primary	Male-only	N/A	
Abdullah bin Jassim Al Thani Boys Model Independent	Mebaireek	Independent	Kindergarten – Primary	Male-only	N/A	
Abdullah bin Zaid Al-Mahmoud Boys Model Independent	Baaya	Independent	Kindergarten – Primary	Male-only	N/A	
Abi Ayyoob Al Ansari Model Independent Boys	Umm Al Seneem	Independent	Kindergarten – Primary	Male-only	N/A	
Abi Haneefa Model Independent Boys	Leqtaifiya	Independent	Kindergarten – Primary	Male-only	N/A	
ACS Doha School	Al-Kheesa	International	Pre-k - Highschool	Both	Official website	
ACS - Alpha Cambridge School	Al Wukhair	International	Kindergarten – Secondary	Both	Official website	
Al Arqam Academy	Abu Hamour	International	Kindergarten – Secondary	Female-only	N/A	
Al Bayan First Primary Independent Girls	Hazm Al Markhiya	Independent	Kindergarten – Primary	Female-only	N/A	
Al Bayan Second Primary Independent Girls	Al Sadd	Independent	Kindergarten – Primary	Female-only	N/A	
Al Duhail Model Independent Boys	Duhail	Independent	Kindergarten – Primary	Male-only	N/A	
Al Emam Ashafei Prep Independent Boys	Muaither	Independent	Primary – Secondary	Male-only	N/A	
Al Falah Primary Independent Girls	Al Mamoura	Independent	Kindergarten – Primary	Female-only	N/A	
Al Ghuwairia Girls School	Al Ghuwariyah	Independent	Kindergarten – Secondary	Female-only	N/A	
Al Hamad International Developed	Old Airport	International	Kindergarten – Secondary	Both		
Al Hekma International School	Al Dafna	International	Kindergarten – Secondary	Both	Official website	
Al Israa Primary Independent Girls	Al Aziziya	Independent	Kindergarten – Primary	Female-only	N/A	
Al Jazeera Academy	N/A	International	Kindergarten – Secondary	Both	Official website	
Al Jumailiya Girls Schools	Al Jemailiya	Independent	Primary – Secondary	Female-only	N/A	
Al Jumailiya Boys Schools	Al Jemailiya	Independent	Primary – Secondary	Male-only	N/A	
Al Kaaban Boys School	Madinat Al Kaaban	Independent	Primary – Secondary	Male-only	N/A	
Al Khwarizmi Independent School	Al Wajbah	Independent	Kindergarten – Primary	Female-only	N/A	
Al Maha Academy for Boys	Ain Khaled	International	Kindergarten – Secondary	Male-only	http://boys.almahaacademy.com.qa/	
Al Maha Academy For Girls	Ain Khaled	International	Kindergarten – Secondary	Female-only	http://girls.almahaacademy.com.qa	
Al-Muntazah English School	Abu Hamour	International	Kindergarten – Secondary	Both	N/A	
Al Qima Academy	Al Manaseer	International	Primary – Secondary	Both	Official website	
Al Shamal Preparatory Boys School	Madinat ash Shamal	Independent	Primary – Secondary	Male-only	N/A	
Al Sharq Al-Awsat International Private School	Al Mamoura	International	Kindergarten – Secondary	Both	N/A	
Al Zubara Boys Schools	Al Zubarah	Independent	Primary – Secondary	Male-only	N/A	
American Academy School	Al Thumama	International	Primary – Secondary	Both	Official website	
American School of Doha	Fereej Al Soudan / Al Waab	International	Kindergarten – Secondary	Both	Official website	
Arab International Academy	Al Sadd	International	Primary – Secondary	Both	Official website	
Al Wataniya International School	Al Dafna	International	Kindergarten – Primary	Both	Official website	
Awsaj Academy	N/A	International	Primary – Secondary	Both	Official website	

=== Kindergarten ===
Name of school	Location	Curriculum	Grade	Genders	Official website	Ref.
ABC 123 Kindergarten	N/A	Independent	Kindergarten	Both	N/A	
Al Aziziya Private Kindergarten	Al Aziziya	Independent	Kindergarten	Both	N/A	
Al Bashaer Private Kindergarten	Al Ebb	Independent	Kindergarten	Both	N/A	
Al Bateel International Nursery	Al Mamoura	International	Kindergarten	Both	N/A	
Al Bayan Secondary Independent Girls	Hazm Al Markhiya	Independent	Secondary	Female-only	N/A	
Al-Bustan Private Kindergarten	N/A	Independent	Kindergarten	Both	N/A	
Al Dana Private Kindergarten	Lejbailat	Independent	Kindergarten	Both	N/A	
Al Doha Minaret Kindergarten	N/A	International	Kindergarten	Both	N/A	
Al Faisal Kindergarten	New Al Rayyan	Independent	Kindergarten	Both	N/A	
Al Fajar Al Jadeed Kindergarten	Old Airport	International	Kindergarten	Both	N/A	
Al Farida Kindergarten	Al Sadd	International	Kindergarten	Both	N/A	
Al Gharafa Modern Kindergarten	Gharrafat Al Rayyan	Independent	Kindergarten	Both	N/A	
Al Huda Kindergarten	Rawdat Al Khail	Independent	Kindergarten	Both	N/A	
Al Jazeera Kindergarten	Al Hilal	Independent	Kindergarten	Both	N/A	
Al Kholoud Kindergarten	Old Airport	International	Kindergarten	Both	N/A	
Al Naman Kindergarten	Madinat Khalifa North	Independent	Kindergarten	Both	N/A	
Al Noor Language Kindergarten	Al Waab	International	Kindergarten	Both	N/A	
Al Redwan Kindergarten	Abu Hamour	Independent	Kindergarten	Both	N/A	
Al Rowad International Kindergarten	N/A	International	Kindergarten	Both	N/A	
Al Sama Kindergarten	Al Kharaitiyat	Independent	Kindergarten	Both	N/A	
Al Thuraya Kindergarten	Al Hilal	International	Kindergarten	Both	N/A	
Al Watan Private Kindergarten	N/A	International	Kindergarten	Both	N/A	
Al Zahra Kindergarten	Al Mashaf	Independent	Kindergarten	Both	N/A	
Al Ashbal International Kindergarten	Ain Khaled	Independent	Kindergarten	Both	Official Website	

=== Primary ===
Name of school	Location	Curriculum	Grade	Genders	Official website	Ref.
Aatikha Primary Girls School	Al Luqta	Independent	Primary	Female-only	N/A	
Al Andalus Elementary Private Schools for Boys	Muaither	Independent	Primary	Male-only	Official website	
Al Ekhlas Model Independent School Boys	Al Sailiya	Independent	Primary	Male-only	N/A	
Al Falah Elementary Private School	N/A	Independent	Primary	Male-only	N/A	
Al Fatah Al Muslimah Elementary Private School	N/A	Independent	Primary	Female-only	N/A	
Al-Furqan Primary School For Boys	N/A	Independent	Primary	Male-only	N/A	
Al Ghashamia Primary Boys Independent School	Umm Al Ghailam	Independent	Primary	Male-only	N/A	
Al Shamal Model School	Madinat ash Shamal	Independent	Primary	Male-only	N/A	
Al Shrouq Model School	Al Wakrah	Independent	Primary	Male-only	N/A	
Al Taawon Independent School	N/A	Independent	Primary	Female-only	N/A	
Az Zaaeen Primary Girls School	Umm Qarn	Independent	Primary	Female-only	N/A	
Az Zakhriya Primary Girls School	Al Thakhira	Independent	Primary	Female-only	N/A	
Az Zakhriya Model Boys School	Al Thakhira	Independent	Primary	Male-only	N/A	

=== Secondary ===
Name of school	Location	Curriculum	Grade	Genders	Official website	Ref.
Abdullah Bin Ali Al Misnad Prep/Sec Independent Boys	Al Khor	Independent	Secondary	Male-only	N/A	
Abdurrahman Bin Jasim Preparatory Independent Boys	Al Wakrah	Independent	Secondary	Male-only	N/A	
Abu Bakr Assedeeq Preparatory Independent Boys	Rawdat Al Khail	Independent	Secondary	Male-only	N/A	
Abu Obaida Preparatory Independent Boys	Al Gharafa	Independent	Secondary	Male-only	N/A	
Ahmad Bin Hanbal Secondary Independent Boys	Najma	Independent	Secondary	Male-only	N/A	
Ahmed Bin Mohmmad Secondary Independent Boys	Ain Khaled	Independent	Secondary	Male-only	N/A	
Al Andalus Preparatory Secondary Private School for Boys	Umm Lekhba	Independent	Secondary	Male-only	Official website	
Al Emam Secondary Independent Girls	Al Mamoura	Independent	Secondary	Female-only	N/A	
Al-Furqan Private Secondary School For Boys	N/A	Independent	Secondary	Male-only	N/A	
Al Mahd International School	Al Thumama	International	Secondary	Both	N/A	
Al Shamal Girls School	Madinat ash Shamal	Independent	Secondary	Female-only	N/A	
Al Tarbia Al Hadeetha Private School for Boys	N/A	Independent	Secondary	Male-only	N/A	

== B ==
Name of school	Location	Curriculum	Grade	Genders	Official website	Ref.
Brilliant Indian International School	Al Duhail	International	Kindergarten – Primary	Both	https://brilliantindianschool.com/	
Bangladesh M.H.M High School and College	Abu Hamour	International	Kindergarten – Primary	Both	N/A	
Beta Cambridge School	Al Wukair	International	Kindergarten – Secondary	Both	Official website	
Bhavan's Public School - Airport	Old Airport	International	Kindergarten – Secondary	Both	Official website	
Bhavan's Public School - Al-Wakra	Al Wakrah	International	Kindergarten – Secondary	Both	Official website	
Birla Public School - Abu Hamour	Abu Hamour	International	Kindergarten – Secondary	Both	Official website	
Birla Public School - Al Hilal	Al Hilal	International	Kindergarten – Secondary	Both	Official website	
Bright Future Pakistani Private School	Muaither	International	Kindergarten – Secondary	Both	Official website	

=== Kindergarten ===
Name of school	Location	Curriculum	Grade	Genders	Official website	Ref.
Baraaem Al Khor Kindergarten	Al Khor	Independent	Kindergarten	Both	N/A	
Birla Public Kindergarten	N/A	International	Kindergarten	Both	Official website	

== C ==
Name of school	Location	Curriculum	Grade	Genders	Official website	Ref.
Cairo Private School For Boys	Al Aziziya	International	Kindergarten – Secondary	Male-only	N/A	
Cairo Private School For Girls	Al Aziziya	International	Kindergarten – Secondary	Female-only	N/A	
Cambridge International School For Girls	Nu`ayjah	International	Kindergarten – Secondary	Female-only	Official website	
Cambridge International School	Al Nuaija East	International	Kindergarten – Secondary	Both	Official website	
Cambridge School	Al Mamoura	International	Kindergarten – Secondary	Both	Official website	
Compass International School Doha - Gharaffa Campus (A Nord Anglia Education School)	Al Gharaffa	International	Kindergarten – Secondary	Both	Official website	
Compass International School Doha - Rayyan Campus (A Nord Anglia Education School)	Al Rayyan	International	Kindergarten – Secondary	Both	Official website	
Compass International School Doha - Madinat Khalifa Campus(A Nord Anglia Education School)	Madinat Khalifa North	International	Primary – Secondary	Both	Official website	

=== Kindergarten ===
Name of school	Location	Curriculum	Grade	Genders	Official website	Ref.
Care & Learn	N/A	International	Kindergarten	Both	N/A	
Creator Kids Kindergarten	Muaither	Independent	Kindergarten	Both	N/A	

=== Primary ===
Name of school	Location	Curriculum	Grade	Genders	Official website	Ref.
Cardiff International Primary School	Al Dafna	International	Primary	Both	N/A	

== D ==
Name of school	Location	Curriculum	Grade	Genders	Official website	Ref.
Doha British School Ain Khaled	Ain Khaled	British	Early years - Primary - Secondary - Sixth Form	Both	Official website	
Doha British School Al Wakra	Al Wakra	British	Early years - Primary - Secondary - Sixth Form	Both	Official website	
Doha British School Rawdat Al-Hamama	Rawdat Al Hamama	British	Early years - Primary - Secondary - IGCSE	Both	Official website	
Doha Modern Indian School	Abu Hamour	International	Kindergarten – Secondary	Both	http://dmisqatar.com	
International School for Medical Science and Engineering	Al Messila	International	Primary – Secondary	Both	Official website	
DPS-Modern Indian School, Doha-Qatar	Al Wakrah	Indian	Kindergarten – Secondary	Both	Official website	
Doha Academy - Al Mamoura	Al Mamoura	International	Kindergarten – Secondary	Both	Official website	
Doha Academy - Salawa	Mesaimeer	International	Kindergarten – Secondary	Both	Official website	
Doha College	Abu Hamour & West Bay	International	Kindergarten – Secondary	Both	(http://www.dohacollege.com Official website)	
Doha English Speaking School	Fereej Kulaib	British	Primary	Both	(http://www.dess.org Official website)	
Doha International School	Hazm Al Markhiya	International	Kindergarten – Primary	Both	N/A	
Doha Modern Indian School	Abu Hamour	International	Kindergarten – Secondary	Both	Official website	
Dukhan English School	Dukhan	International	Kindergarten – Secondary	Both	Official website	

=== Kindergarten ===
Name of school	Location	Curriculum	Grade	Genders	Official website	Ref.
Danat Al Shamal Kindergarten	Madinat ash Shamal	Independent	Kindergarten	Both	N/A	
Doha International Kindergarten	Al Mamoura	International	Kindergarten	Both	N/A	

== E ==
Name of school	Location	Curriculum	Grade	Genders	Official website	Ref.
Edison International Academy - Al Markhiya	Al Markhiya	International	Kindergarten – Secondary	Both	N/A	
Edison International Academy - Dahl Al Hamam	Dahl Al Hammam	International	Kindergarten – Secondary	Both	N/A	
Edison International Academy - Muaither	Muaither	International	Kindergarten – Secondary	Both	N/A	
Egyptian Language School	Al Mamoura	International	Kindergarten – Secondary	Both	N/A	
Elite International School	Al Aziziya	International	Kindergarten – Secondary	Both	N/A	
English Modern School - Doha	Al Messila	International	Kindergarten – Secondary	Both	Official website	
English Modern School - Al Khor	Al Khor	International	Kindergarten – Secondary	Both	Official website	
English Modern School - Al Wakrah	Al Wakrah	International	Kindergarten – Secondary	Both	Official website	

== G ==
Name of school	Location	Curriculum	Grade	Genders	Official website	Ref.
GEMS American Academy	Al Wukair	American	Kindergarten - Ninth Grade	Both	Official website	
GEMS Wellington School	Al Wukair	British	Kindergarten - Ninth Grade	Both	Official website	
German International School	Al Mamoura	International	Kindergarten – Secondary	Both	Official website	
Global Academy International	Old Airport	International	Kindergarten – Secondary	Both	N/A	
Gulf English School	Al Gharafa	International	Kindergarten – Secondary	Both	Official website	

== H ==
Name of school	Location	Curriculum	Grade	Genders	Official website	Ref.
Hayat Universal School	Muaither	International	Kindergarten – Secondary	Both	Official website	
Hamilton International School	Mesaimeer	ISP	Kindergarten - Secondary	Both	this.qa	

=== Kindergarten ===
Name of school	Location	Curriculum	Grade	Genders	Official website	Ref.
Haqel Al Rabeea Kindergarten - Al Wakrah	Al Wakrah	International	Kindergarten	Both	N/A	
Haqel Al Rabeea Kindergarten - Airport	Old Airport	International	Kindergarten	Both	N/A	

== I ==
Name of school	Location	Curriculum	Grade	Genders	Official website	Ref.
Ibn Seena Model Independent Boys	Al Ebb	Independent	Kindergarten – Primary	Male-only	N/A	
Ideal Indian School	Abu Hamour	International	Kindergarten – Secondary	Both	Official website	
International British School	Duhail/Bani Hajer	International	Kindergarten – Secondary	Both		
International Leaders School	Ain Khaled	International	Kindergarten – Secondary	Both	N/A	
International Philippine School	Ain Khaled	International	Kindergarten – Secondary	Female-only	N/A	
International School of Choueifat	West Bay	International	Kindergarten – Secondary	Both	N/A	

=== Kindergarten ===
Name of school	Location	Curriculum	Grade	Genders	Official website	Ref.
Iqraa English Kindergarten	Nu`ayjah	International	Kindergarten	Both	Official website	

=== Primary ===
Name of school	Location	Curriculum	Grade	Genders	Official website	Ref.
Iqraa English School For Boys	Al Aziziya	International	Primary	Male-only	Official website	
Iqraa English School For Girls	Al Mamoura	International	Primary	Female-only	Official website	
Iranian Elementary School For Boys	Abu Hamour	International	Primary	Male-only	N/A	

=== Secondary ===
Name of school	Location	Curriculum	Grade	Genders	Official website	Ref.
Ibn Khaldoon Preparatory Independent Boys	Al Gharafa	Independent	Secondary	Male-only	N/A	

== J ==
Name of school	Location	Curriculum	Grade	Genders	Official website	Ref.
Japan School of Doha	Rawdat Egdaim	International	Primary – Secondary	Both	Official website	
Jordanian Private School	Ain Khaled	International	Kindergarten – Secondary	Both	N/A	

== K ==
=== Kindergarten ===
Name of school	Location	Curriculum	Grade	Genders	Official website	Ref.
Kids Academy Kindergarten	Muaither	International	Kindergarten	Both	N/A	
Kingdom Kindergarten	Leqtaifiya	International	Kindergarten	Both	N/A	

== L ==
Name of school	Location	Curriculum	Grade	Genders	Official website	Ref.
London International School	N/A	International	Kindergarten – Secondary	Both	Official website	
Lycée Bonaparte	Onaiza	International	Kindergarten – Secondary	Both	Official website	
Lycée Franco-Qatarien Voltaire - Al Waab	Al Waab	International	Primary – Secondary	Both	Official website	
Lycée Franco-Qatarien Voltaire - West Bay	West Bay	International	Kindergarten – Secondary	Both	Official website	

== M ==
Name of school	Location	Curriculum	Grade	Genders	Official website	Ref.
M.E.S Indian school	Abu Hamour	International	Kindergarten – Secondary	Both	Official website	
Mesaieed International Private School	Mesaieed	International	Primary – Secondary	Both	http://mis.qp.qa/	

=== Kindergarten ===
Name of school	Location	Curriculum	Grade	Genders	Official website	Ref.
Modern Muaither Kindergarten	Muaither	Independent	Kindergarten	Both	N/A	

== N ==
Name of school	Location	Curriculum	Grade	Genders	Official website	Ref.
Newton International School - Al Hilal	Al Hilal	International	Kindergarten – Secondary	Both	Official website	
Newton International School - Al Waab	Al Waab	International	Kindergarten – Secondary	Male-only	Official website	
Nord Anglia International School - Al Khor (A Nord Anglia Education School)	Al Khor	International	Kindergarten – Secondary	Both	Official website	

=== Kindergarten ===
Name of school	Location	Curriculum	Grade	Genders	Official website	Ref.
New Generation Kindergarten	Al Sadd	Independent	Kindergarten	Both	N/A	
Newton International Kindergarten	Leqtaifiya	International	Kindergarten	Both	Official website	

=== Secondary ===
Name of school	Location	Curriculum	Grade	Genders	Official website	Ref.
Newton International School - West Bay	West Bay	International	Secondary	Both	Official website	

== P ==
Name of school	Location	Curriculum	Grade	Genders	Official website	Ref.
Pak Shama School	N/A	International	Kindergarten – Secondary	Both	Official website	
Park House English School	N/A	International	Kindergarten – Secondary	Both	Official website	
Pakistan International School	Abu Hamour	International	Kindergarten-Secondary	Both	Official website	
Philippine School Doha	Abu Hamour	Philippine	Kindergarten-Secondary	Both	Official Website	
Philippine International School-Qatar	Ain Khaled	Philippine	Kindergarten-Secondary	Both	Official Website	

== Q ==
Name of school	Location	Curriculum	Grade	Genders	Official website	Ref.
Qatar Academy - Al Khor	Al Khor	International	Kindergarten – Secondary	Both	Official website	
Qatar Academy - Doha	Doha	International	EEC – Grade 12	Both	N/A	
Qatar Academy - Al Wakrah	Al Wakrah	International	Kindergarten – Primary	Both	Official website	
Qatar Academy for Science and Technology	Education City, Doha	International	Grade 8 - Grade 12	Both	Official website	
Qatar Academy Sidra	Qatar Foundation, Al Rayyan	International	Kindergarten – Secondary	Both	Official website	
Qatar Canadian School	N/A	International	Kindergarten – Secondary	Both	Official website	
Qatar International School	West Bay	International	Kindergarten – Secondary	Both	N/A	
Qatar Leadership Academy	Al Khor	International	Primary – Secondary	Both	Official website	

=== Kindergarten ===
Name of school	Location	Curriculum	Grade	Genders	Official website	Ref.
Qatar Al-Hadeetha	Umm Lekhba	Independent	Kindergarten	Both	N/A	

== R ==
Name of school	Location	Curriculum	Grade	Genders	Official website	Ref.
Rajagiri Public School	Abu Hamour	CBSE	Kindergarten - Grade 11	Both	Official Website	
Royal International School	Muaither	International	Kindergarten – Secondary	Both	N/A	

=== Kindergarten ===
Name of school	Location	Curriculum	Grade	Genders	Official website	Ref.
Rising Stars Kindergarten	Old Airport	International	Kindergarten	Both	N/A	

== S ==
Name of school	Location	Curriculum	Grade	Genders	Official website	Ref.
Swiss International School of Qatar	Al Luqta	International Baccalaureate (IB)	Kindergarten – Secondary	Both	www.sisq.qa	
Shantiniketan Indian School	Al Wakra	Indian	Kindergarten – Secondary	Both	www.sisqatar.info	
SEK International School Qatar	Al Dafna	International Baccalaureate (IB)	Kindergarten – Secondary	Both	www.sek.qa	
Sherborne Qatar	Multiple locations	International	Kindergarten – Secondary	Both	Official website	
Sudanese School For Boys	Al Gharafa	International	Primary – Secondary	Male-only	N/A	
Sudanese School For Girls	New Al Rayyan	International	Primary – Secondary	Female-only	N/A	
Syrian School	Al Luqta	International	Kindergarten – Secondary	Both	N/A	

=== Kindergarten ===
Name of school	Location	Curriculum	Grade	Genders	Official website	Ref.
Swiss International School of Qatar	Al Luqta	International Baccalaureate (IB)	Kindergarten	Both	www.sisq.qa	
SEK International School Qatar	Al Dafna	International Baccalaureate (IB)	Kindergarten	Both	www.sek.qa	
Step One Private Kindergarten	Al Hilal	International	Kindergarten	Both	N/A	
Summit Academy Kindergarten	Duhail	International	Kindergarten	Both	www.summitacademyqatar.com	

=== Primary ===
Name of school	Location	Curriculum	Grade	Genders	Official website	Ref.
Swiss International School of Qatar	Al Luqta	International Baccalaureate (IB-PYP)	Primary	Both	www.sisq.qa	
SEK International School Qatar	Al Dafna	International Baccalaureate (IB-PYP)	Primary	Both	Official website	
Step One School	Nu`ayjah	International	Primary	Both	N/A	

=== Secondary ===
Name of school	Location	Curriculum	Grade	Genders	Official website	Ref.
SEK International School Qatar	Al Dafna	International Baccalaureate (IB)	Secondary (IB-MYP & IB-DP)	Both	www.sek.qa	

== T ==
Name of school	Location	Curriculum	Grade	Genders	Official website	Ref.
The Lebanese School of Qatar	Onaiza	Lebanese & International Baccalaureate	Kindergarten – Secondary	Both	Official website	
The Phoenix Private School	Al Mamoura	International	Kindergarten – Secondary	Both	www.pps.sch.qa	
The Scholars' International School	Muaither	International	Kindergarten – Secondary	Both	Official website	
Tunisian School	Al Luqta	International	Primary – Secondary	Both	Official website	

=== Primary ===
Name of school	Location	Curriculum	Grade	Genders	Official website	Ref.
Tamakon School	N/A	Ite				

== See also ==
- Education in Qatar
- Lists of schools
