= Qatar Turkish School =

Turkish school in Doha, Qatar

Coordinates: 25°14′5.8″N 51°28′10.0″E

Qatar Turkish School is a Turkish curriculum school based in Ain Khaled. The school is the first ever Turkish school to be opened in Qatar, it officially opened in December 2016. It is the only Turkish school in Qatar. The school is also relatively close to Doha British School, another school based in Ain Khaled. This school is directly controlled by the Turkish Embassy and continues its activities by being integrated into the Turkish Ministry of National Education school system (https://www.meb.k12.tr/index.php).
