= Mesaimeer =

Mesaimeer مسيمير
- District
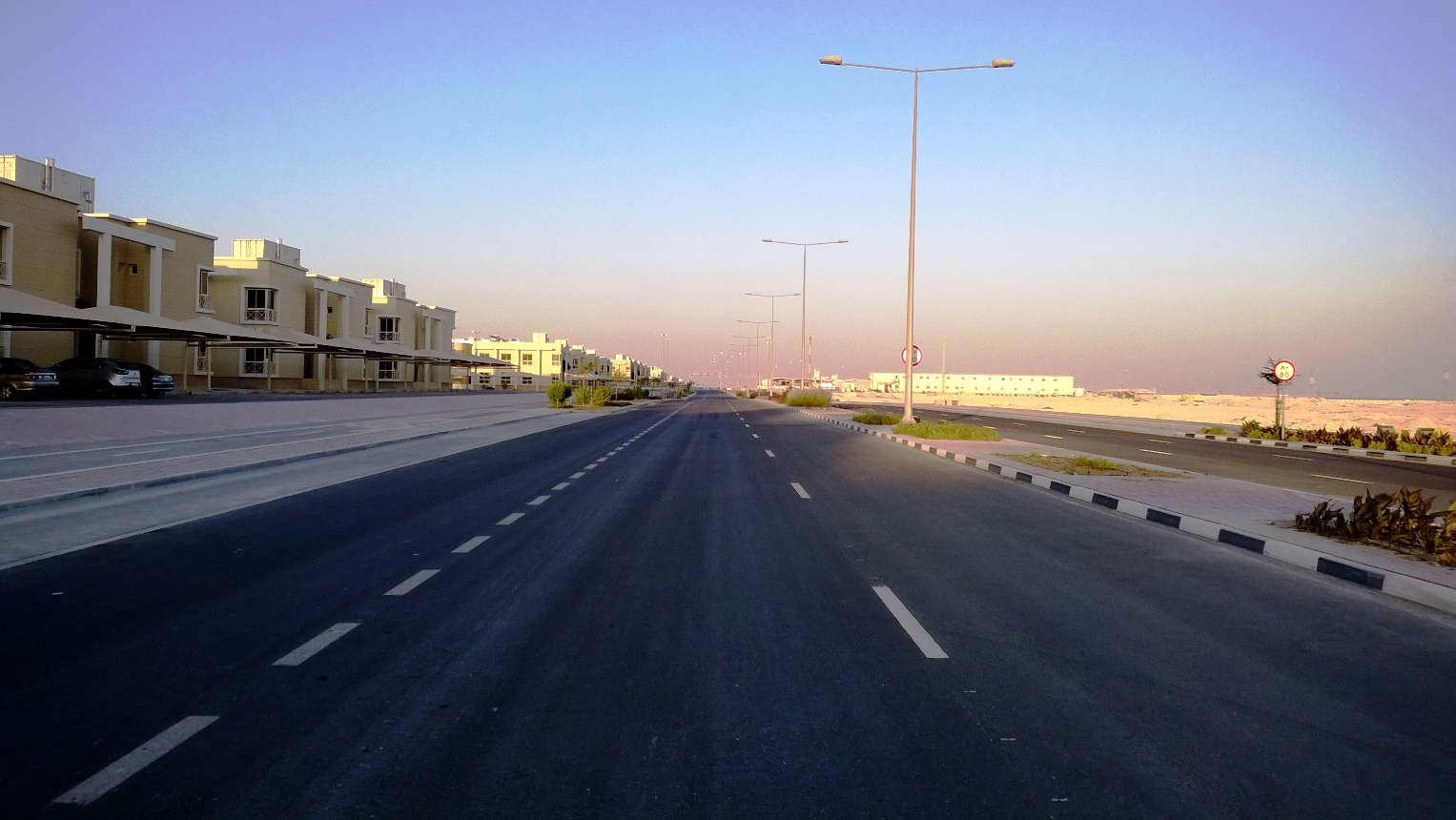
- Barwa City in Mesaimeer

- Location within Qatar
- Coordinates: 25°11′24″N 51°29′23″E
- Country: Qatar
- Municipality: Al Rayyan
- Zone: Zone 56
- District no.: 98

Area
  - Total: 28.5 km^{2} (11.0 sq mi)
- Elevation: 17 m (56 ft)

Mesaimeer (Arabic: مسيمير, romanized: Musaymīr) is a district in the municipality of Al Rayyan, Qatar. Located south-west of Doha, it shares borders with the Doha Industrial Area to the east, Umm Al Seneem, Abu Hamour and Al Mamoura to the north-west, Al Thumama to the east, and Wadi Aba Saleel and Jery Musabbeh to the south-east.

== Etymology ==
The district derives its name from the Arabic word musmar, meaning "nail". Regionally, the term musmar is used to describe dark-colored jagged stones with heads that resemble nails. As these stones are found abundantly in the area, it was decided that its name would reflect this feature.

== History ==
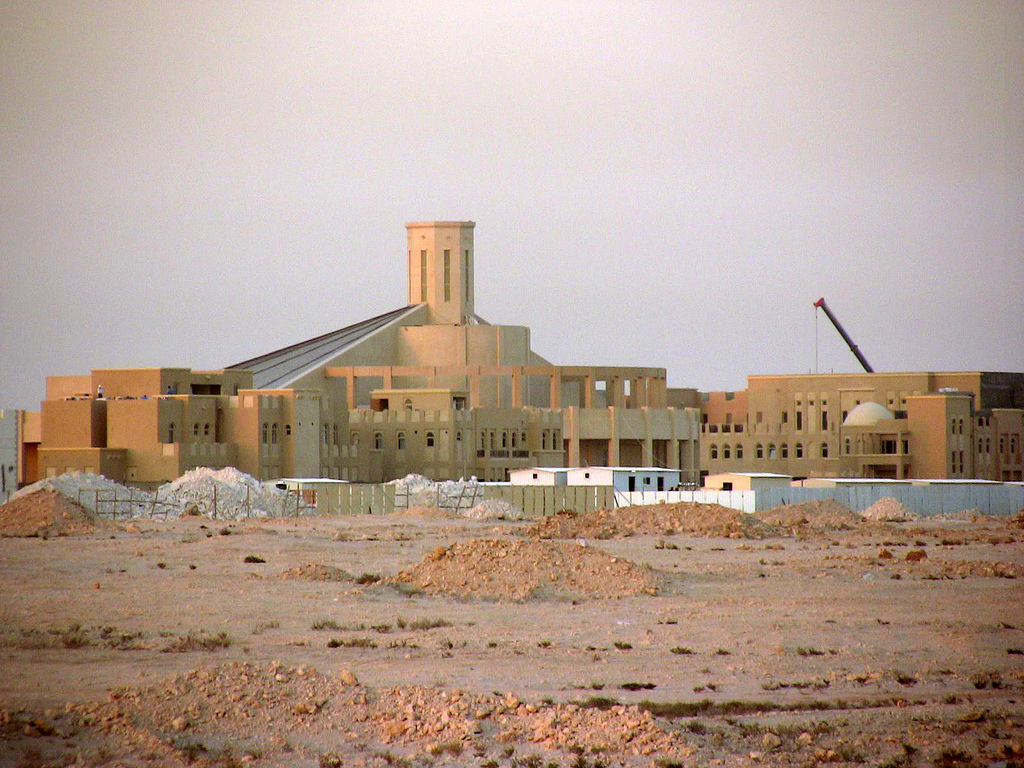
Catholic Church of Our Lady of the Rosary in Mesaimeer

=== 19th century ===
Mesaimeer was the site of the Battle of Mesaimeer, fought in June 1851 between joint Qatari–Bahraini forces, led by Mohammed bin Thani and Ali bin Khalifa, against the Saudi ruler Faisal bin Turki. The battle lasted three days and featured intense close-quarters skirmishes and gun fights around Mesaimeer and Al Bidda. Qatari tribes were mainly involved in the fighting, with the Bahraini representative, Ali bin Khalifa, observing from sea. On the third day of fighting, Faisal bin Turki fled to his camp in Mesaimeer.

Shortly after the battle, Mohammed bin Thani sent a letter to Faisal bin Turki's camp separately requesting peace and agreeing to be his subject, to which Faisal obliged. On 8 June, Qatari forces assumed control of Burj Al-Maah, a watchtower guarding Doha's main water source, close to Al Bidda Fort where the allied forces of Ali bin Khalifa and Saeed bin Tahnun Al Nahyan were stationed. Upon hearing the news, which they regarded as treachery by the Qatari sheikh, they fled to Bahrain without incident.

The battle created political enmity between Qatar and Bahrain which contributed to the Qatari–Bahraini War in 1867 and Qatar's subsequent emergence as an independent political entity in September 1868 with the signing of a treaty between Mohammad bin Thani and the British representative Lewis Pelly. The battle also served as Jassim bin Mohammed's inspiration to create a flag for Qatar, as his side was the only one lacking its own flag.

=== 20th century ===
In 1908, J. G. Lorimer made note of Mesaimeer in his Gazetteer of the Persian Gulf, giving its location as "7 miles south of Dohah and 8 from the east coast". He goes on to state:

"There are about 10 unlined wells, 1 1/2 fathoms deep, of good water. This is the spot where Turkish troops were cut up in February 1893, when the Wali of Basrah visited Dohah."

=== 21st century ===
In 2008, the first Christian church in Qatar, Catholic Church of Our Lady of the Rosary, was constructed in Mesaimeer's religious complex. The government agreed to allow the Evangelical Churches Alliance Qatar to construct a church in the complex in 2015, and construction on the church was set to begin in 2016. Today, the 'Religious Complex' comprises many churches, including the Syro Malabar Church, the Malankara Catholic Church, the Pentecostal churches, the Malankara Orthodox Church and the Anglican Church.

== Landmarks ==
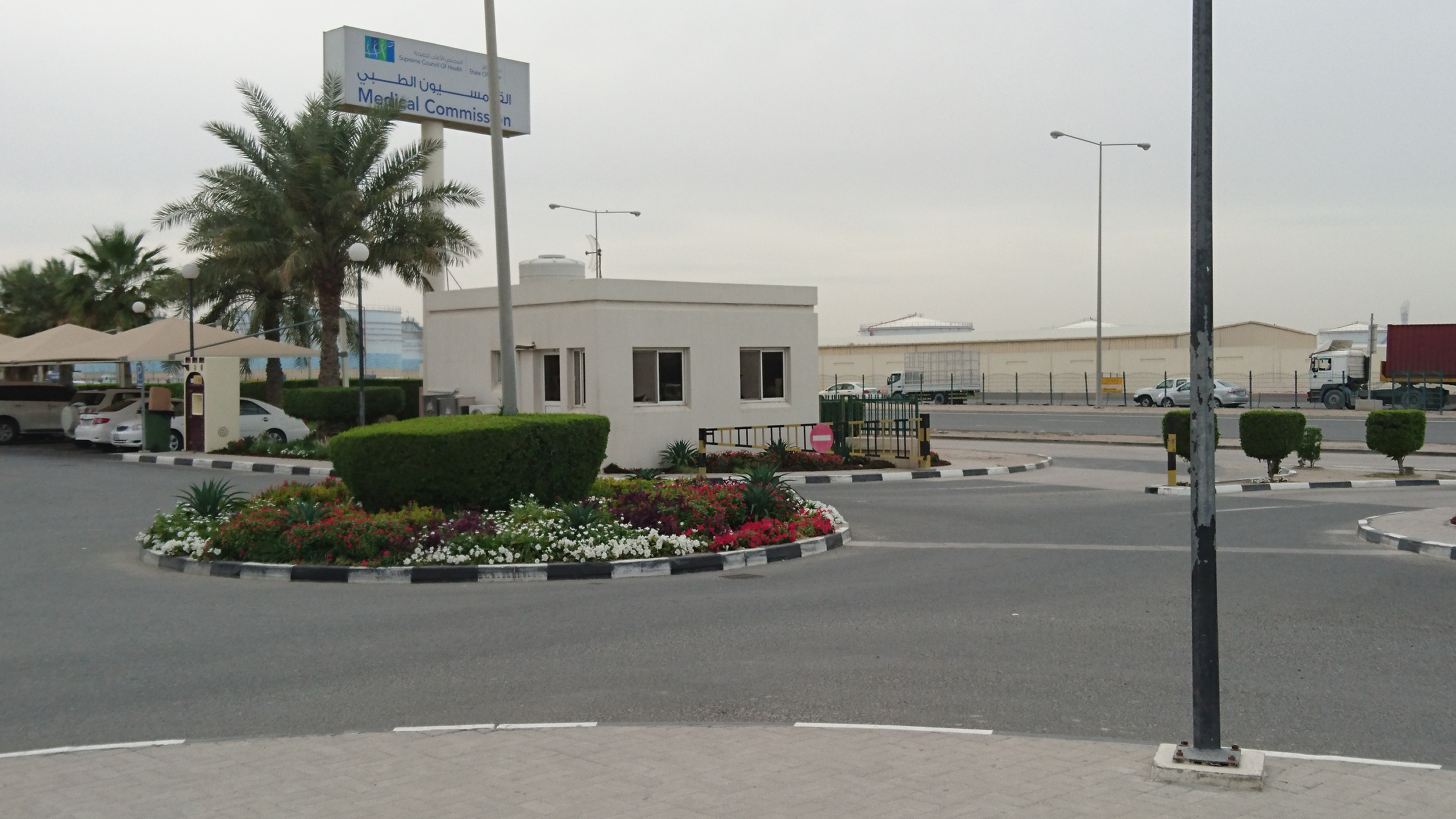
Medical Commission Department in Mesaimeer

- Medical Commission Department (Supreme Council of Health) on Al Muntazah Street.
- Mesaimeer Service Center, General Directorate of Passports and Expatriates Affairs on Abu Hamour Street.
- Workers Health Center Mesaimeer, Qatar Red Crescent Medical Affairs, near Religious Complex; providing healthcare to half million single male workers annually.
- Police Department on Abu Hamour Street.
- Mesaimeer Graveyard on Barwa Commercial Avenue.
- Mesaimeer Health Centre on Wholesale Market Street.
- Al Meera Supercenter in Mesaimeer.
- WOQOD Vehicle Inspection (FAHES), a subsidiary of Qatar Fuel, opened a vehicle inspection center in Mesaimeer in January 2015 at the cost QR 18 million. It was the company's third center of its kind.

== Sports ==
The district is currently represented by Mesaimeer SC, a multi-sports club whose football team competes in the Qatar Stars League.

== Transport ==
Currently, the at-grade Mesaimeer Metro Station is under construction, having been launched during Phase 2A. Once completed, it will be part of Doha Metro's Green Line.

== Development ==
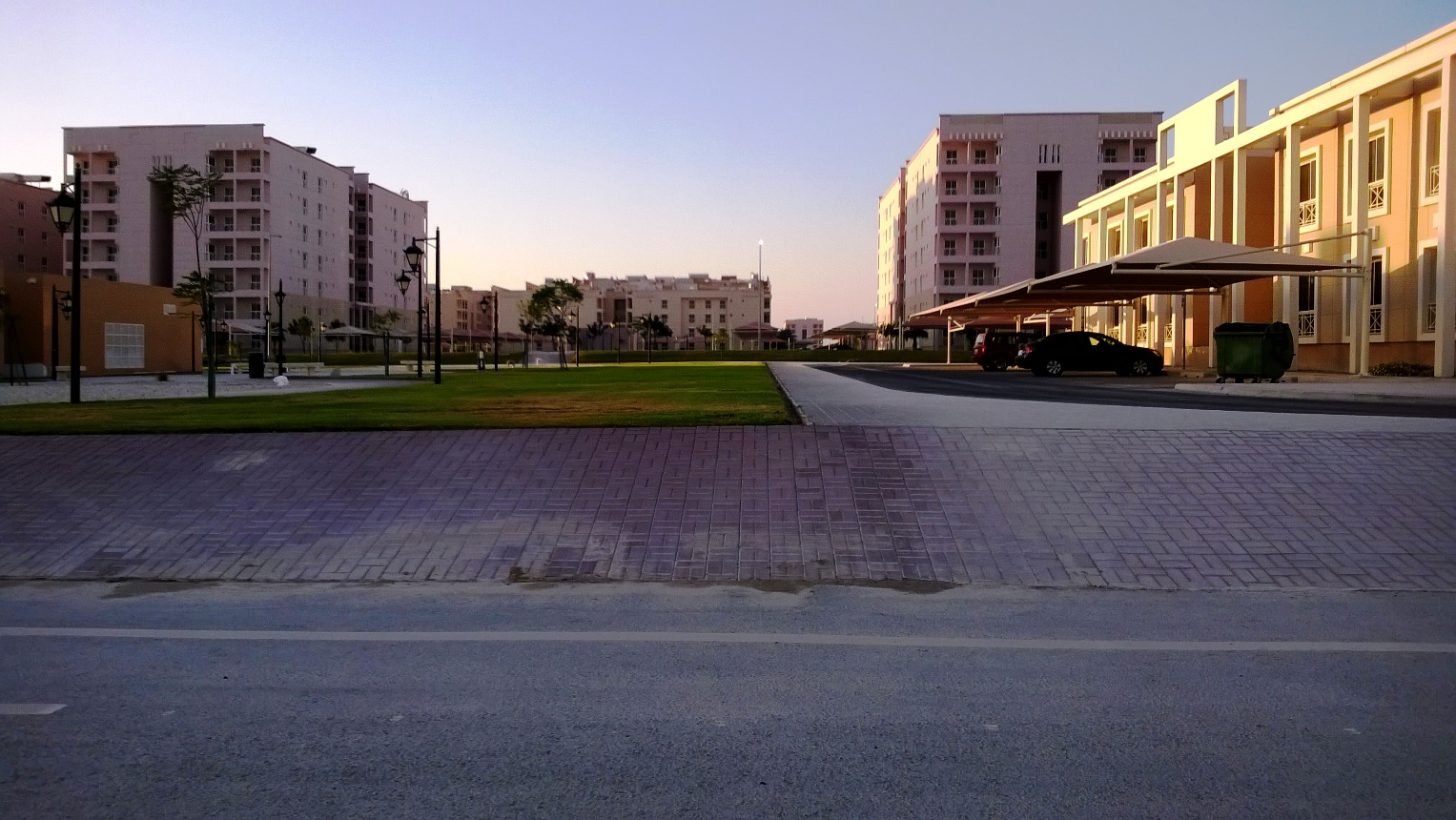
Barwa City in 2013

A project known as 'Masaken Mesaimeer' was launched by Barwa Group in February 2009. The project is set to construct 1,000 residential housing units, a supermarket, a nursery, and a mosque within a gated compound.

Another housing project headed by Barwa Group known as Barwa City, situated between Mesaimeer and Abu Hamour, received its first occupants in 2012. Barwa City contains 6,968 housing units spread across 128 buildings, and covers an area of 1.35 million sq meters. It contains multiple amenities including schools, parks and mosques.

== Education ==
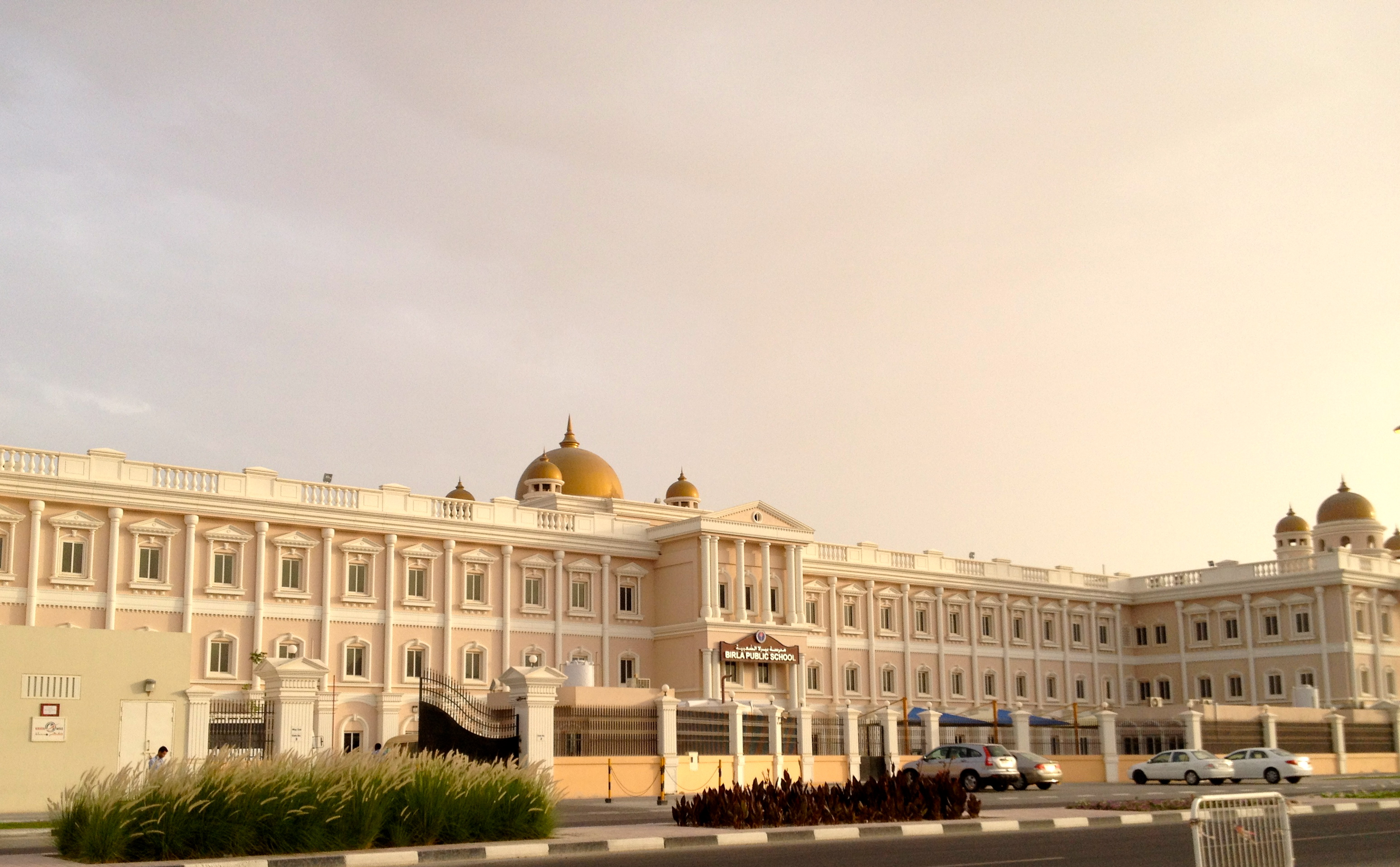
Birla Public School in Mesaimeer

Name of School	Curriculum	Grade	Genders	Official website	Ref
Doha Academy - Salawa	International	Kindergarten – Secondary	Both	Official website	
Indian Islamic School	International	Kindergarten – Secondary	Both	N/A	
Birla Public School - Mesaimeer	International	Kindergarten – Secondary	Both	Official website	
