= Old Airport (Doha) =

Old Airport المطار العتيق
- District
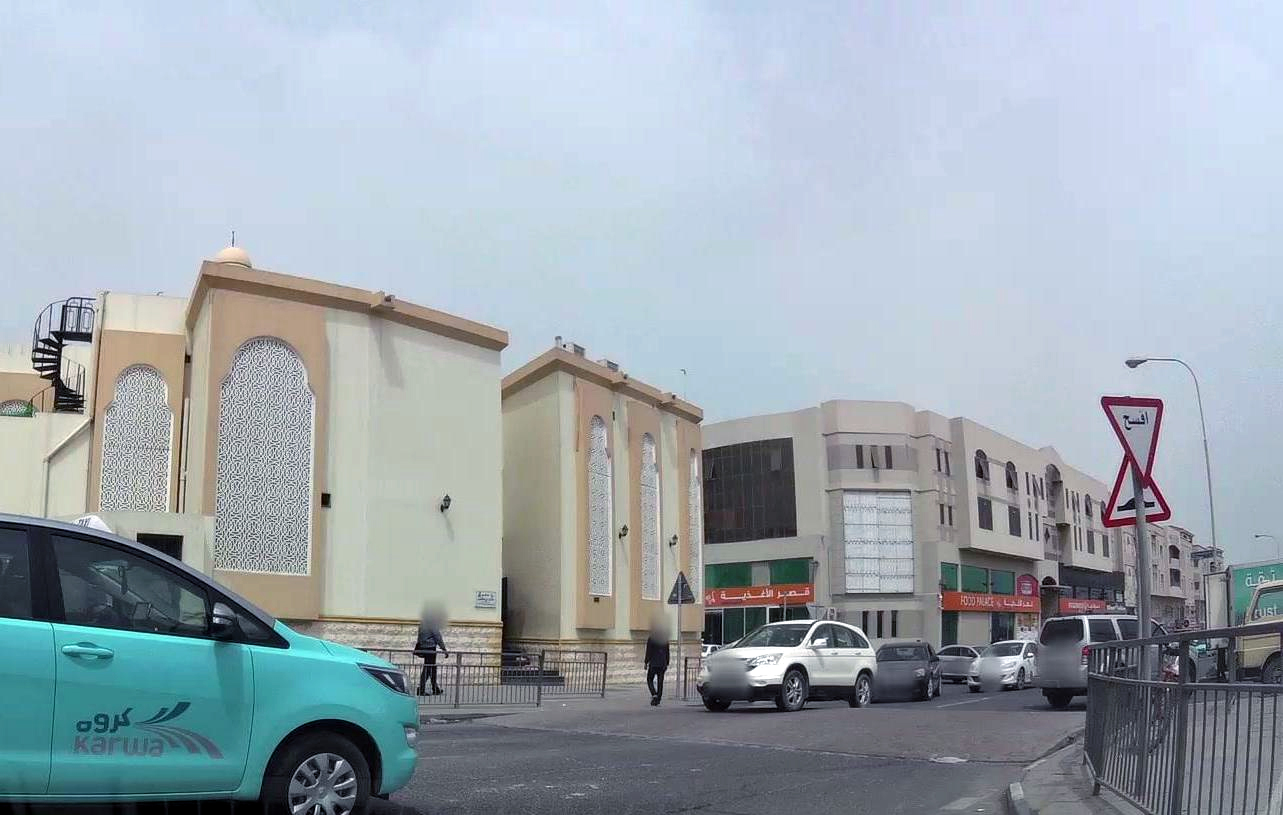
- Al Matar Al Qadeem Street in Old Airport

- Location within Doha Location within Qatar
- Coordinates: 25.248141°N 51.554443°E
- Country: Qatar
- Municipality: Doha
- Zone: Zone 45
- District no.: 44

Area
  - Total: 4.7 km^{2} (1.8 sq mi)

Population (2010)
  - Total: 44,275
  - Density: 9,400/km^{2} (24,000/sq mi)

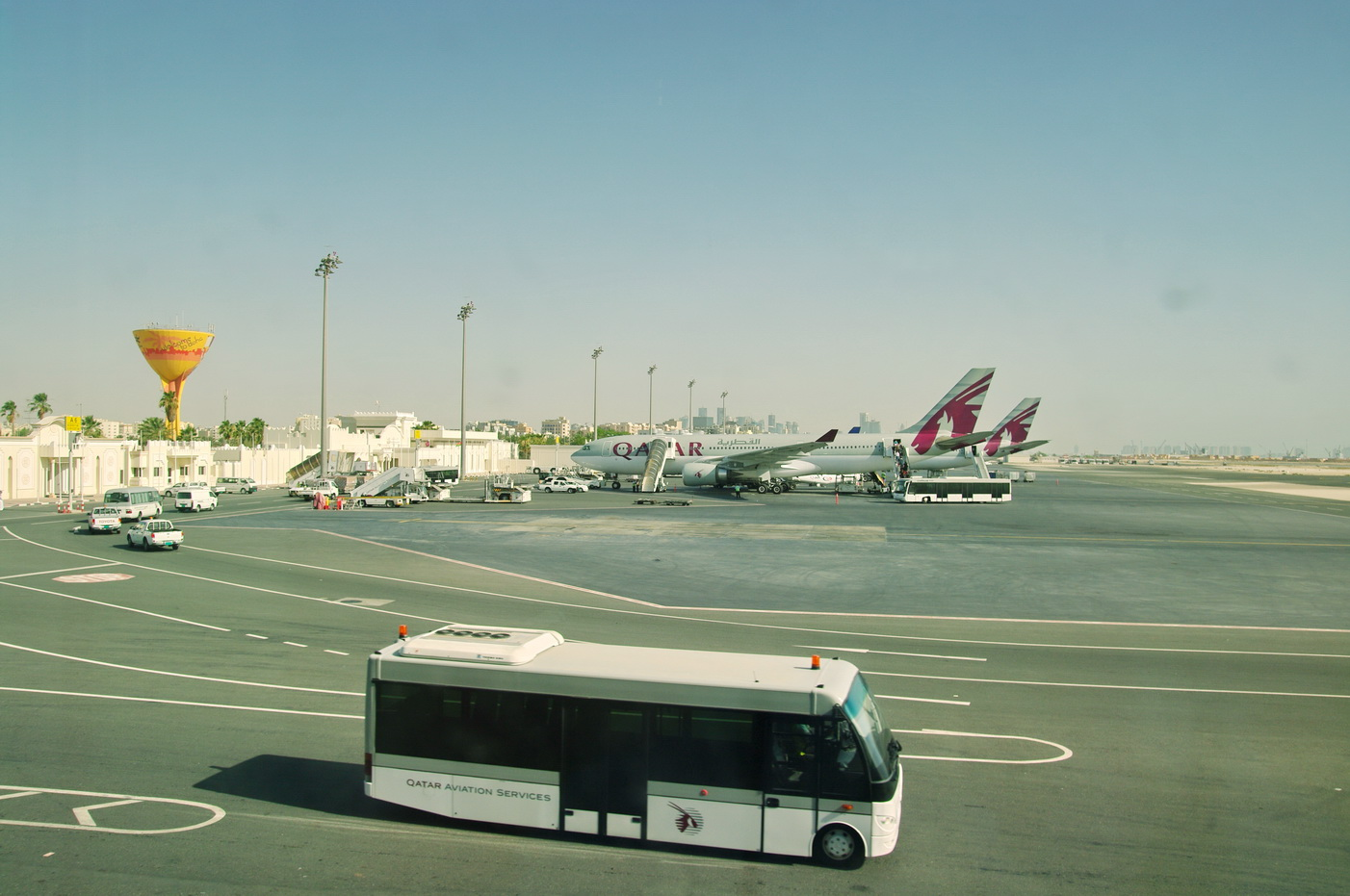
Old Doha International Airport

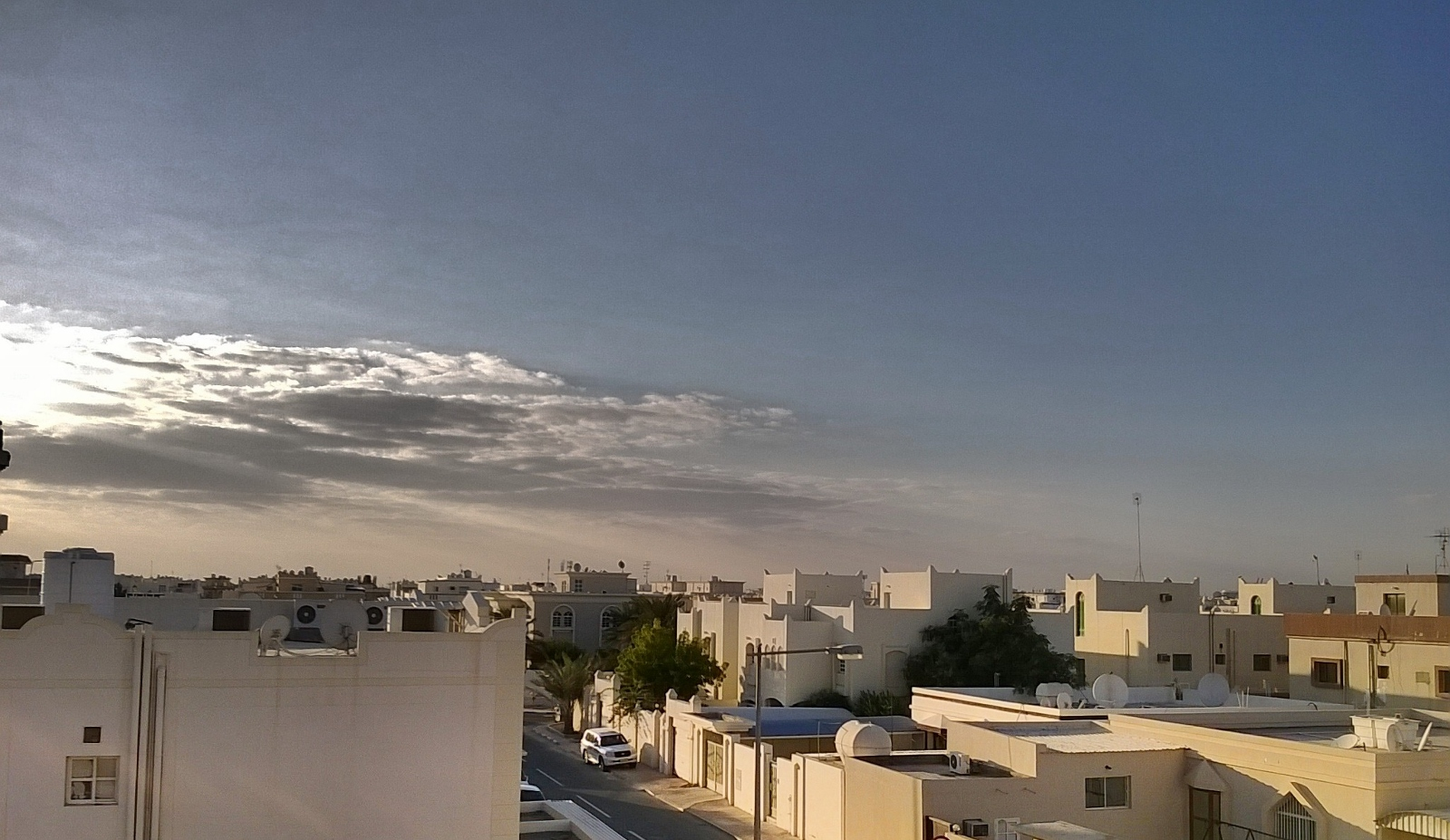
Neighborhood in Old Airport

Old Airport (Arabic: المطار العتيق; also referred to as Al Matar Al Qadeem) is a district of Doha, Qatar. The district is one of the most established and densely inhabited neighborhoods in Doha. Situated in the southern part of the city, it served as the site of Doha's international airport prior to the construction of the Hamad International Airport. Covering an area of approximately 1,304 acres, the neighborhood is characterized by a predominance of standalone villas, modest commercial establishments, and a few institutional buildings, including schools. In 1997, the district became home to The Mall, the first enclosed shopping mall in Doha. The neighborhood generally attracts middle-income residents, particularly male bachelors, and features a grid-pattern street layout.

The main thoroughfare running through the district is Al Matar Al Qadeem Street, also known as Old Airport Street, which features a variety of retail shops, restaurants, and service-oriented businesses serving the surrounding residential population. While the area lacks formal public spaces and exhibits little architectural cohesion, it remains one of Doha's most active mixed-use corridors outside the city center. Vehicular traffic is heavy, and with public transport limited to primary roads, pedestrian accessibility is constrained and on-street parking is widespread, often dominating the streetscape.

== History ==
The Qatar government decided to create an airport in the mid-1900s, and Old Airport served as the site of this before it was relocated to a new site. Municipal officials turned their attention towards developing Old Airport in the 1970s. In the 1980s, the falling price of oil resulted in these plans scaled back and eventually put on hold indefinitely. No new master plans have been put in place for the district since then. In September 1985, a post office was opened in the district.

== Central Municipal Council ==
When free elections of the Central Municipal Council first took place in Qatar during 1999, Old Airport was designated the seat of constituency no. 9. It would remain seat of constituency no. 9 in the next three consecutive elections until the fifth municipal elections in 2015, when it was decided that it would become the seat of constituency no. 8. Included among constituency no. 8's districts are Ras Abu Aboud, east Nu`ayjah, Al Khulaifat, Al Hitmi, Doha Port, Al Mirqab, Al Souq, Old Al Ghanim, Al Jasrah, Umm Ghuwailina, Najma, Fereej bin Durham, Al Hilal, Al Mansoura, and Barahat Al Jufairi.

In the inaugural municipal elections in 1999, Abdulrahman Mohammed Al-Jufairi won the elections, receiving 61%, or 617 votes. Trailing behind him with 28.2%, or 285 votes was Salman Ahmed Mohammed Al Meer. Voter turnout was 84.7%. Constituency no. 9 became in notable in the 2002 elections when it elected Sheikha Yousuf Hasan Al Jufairi, making her the first woman win a municipal election in the GCC. Al-Jufairi went on to retain her seat in the three following elections in 2007, 2011 and 2015.

== Transport ==
=== Road ===
Mowasalat is the official transport company of Qatar and serves the community through its operation of public bus routes. Old Airport is served by one bus line which departs from Al Ghanim Bus Station. Route 11 has stops at Najma, LuLu Hypermarket and Old Airport and a terminus at Al Thumama at Bus Stop 5, running at a frequency of every 20 minutes on all days of the week.

Major roads that run through the district are D Ring Road, E Ring Road, Airport Street (also known as Matar Street) and Najma Street. Private vehicles and taxis are the dominant means of transport, while infrastructure for non-motorized travel, such as cycling and walking, is underdeveloped. Sidewalks are present but often in disrepair, functioning more as curbs than integrated pedestrian pathways. The absence of dedicated pedestrian crossings and inadequate sidewalk continuity pose safety concerns, particularly near commercial zones. The neighborhood's traffic management measures are minimal, with speed humps being the primary form of calming device. Parking is typically informal and decentralized, with vehicles parked along internal streets or in front of individual shops and homes.

=== Air ===
Doha International Airport, previously Qatar's main airport, was located near here. It was made defunct after the opening of Hamad International Airport in May 2014 but remains active for government flights, military, and diplomatic flights.

=== Rail ===
Currently, two underground metro stations serve Old Airport: the Al Matar Al Qadeem Metro Station, and the Oqba Ibn Nafie Metro Station, both of which are part of the Red Line of the Doha Metro. As part of the metro's Phase 1, the stations were inaugurated on 8 May, 2019, along with most other Red Line stations.

Al Matar Al Qadeem station is situated at the crossing of Airport Street and D Ring Road, and provides underground pedestrian tunnels at all four corners. Among the station's facilities are a Qatar National Bank ATM, a prayer room and restrooms. Nearby landmarks within walking distance include the Old Airport Park, the Oryx Rotana Hotel and the defunct Doha International Airport. There are no metrolinks serving the station.

Oqba Ibn Nafie station is located at the Airport Street–Oqba Ibn Nafie intersection, to the south of Al Matar Al Qadeem Station. It contains the same facilities as the Al Matar Al Qadeem station. There are a total of three metrolinks, which is the Doha Metro's feeder bus network, servicing the station:

- M123, which serves Old Airport and Nuaija.
- M124, which serves Old Airport.
- M125, which serves Al Thumama.

== Qatar National Master Plan ==
The Qatar National Master Plans (QNMP) is described as a "spatial representation of the Qatar National Vision 2030". As part of the QNMP's Urban Centre plan, which aims to implement development strategies in 28 central hubs that will serve their surrounding communities, Old Airport has been designated a Town Centre, which is the third-highest designation.

Much of Old Airport Town Centre's importance lies in its status as a route between southeast Doha and Al Wakrah. Thus, the plan emphasizes constructing more mixed-use office and retail space, improved pedestrian infrastructure and higher building heights on Airport Street, which connects the two regions. Pedestrian accessibility is another priority of the centre plan, particularly the construction of overhead pedestrian bridges.

== Demographics ==
Neighborhood in Old Airport

As of the 2010 census, the district comprised 10,063 housing units and 856 establishments. There were 44,275 people living in the district, of which 61% were male and 39% were female. Out of the 44,275 inhabitants, 72% were 20 years of age or older and 28% were under the age of 20. The literacy rate stood at 98%.

Employed persons made up 57% of the total population. Females accounted for 22% of the working population, while males accounted for 78% of the working population.

== Education ==
The following schools are located in Old Airport:

Name of School	Curriculum	Grade	Genders	Official Website	Ref
Al Hamad International Developed	International	Kindergarten – Secondary	Both	N/A	
American Academy	International	Primary – Secondary	Both	Official website	
Al Fajar Al Jadeed Kindergarten	International	Kindergarten	Both	N/A	
Al Kholoud Kindergarten	International	Kindergarten	Both	N/A	
Bhavan's Public School - Airport	International	Kindergarten – Secondary	Both	Official website	
Global Academy International	International	Kindergarten – Secondary	Both	Official website	
Haqel Al Rabeea Kindergarten - Airport	International	Kindergarten	Both	N/A	
Rising Stars Kindergarten	International	Kindergarten	Both	Official website	

== Gallery ==
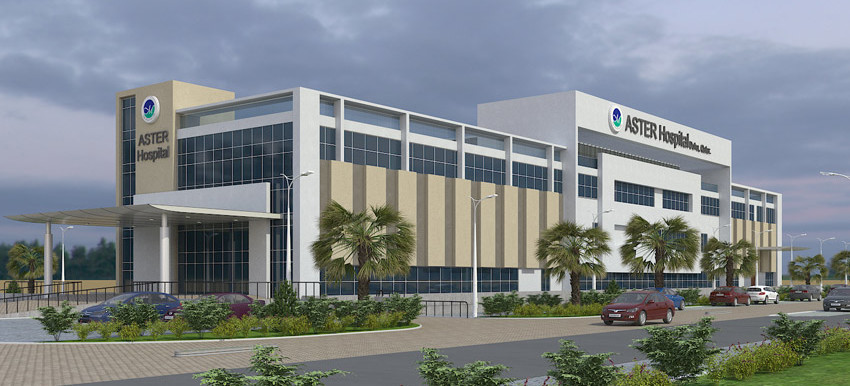
Aster Hospital in Old Airport

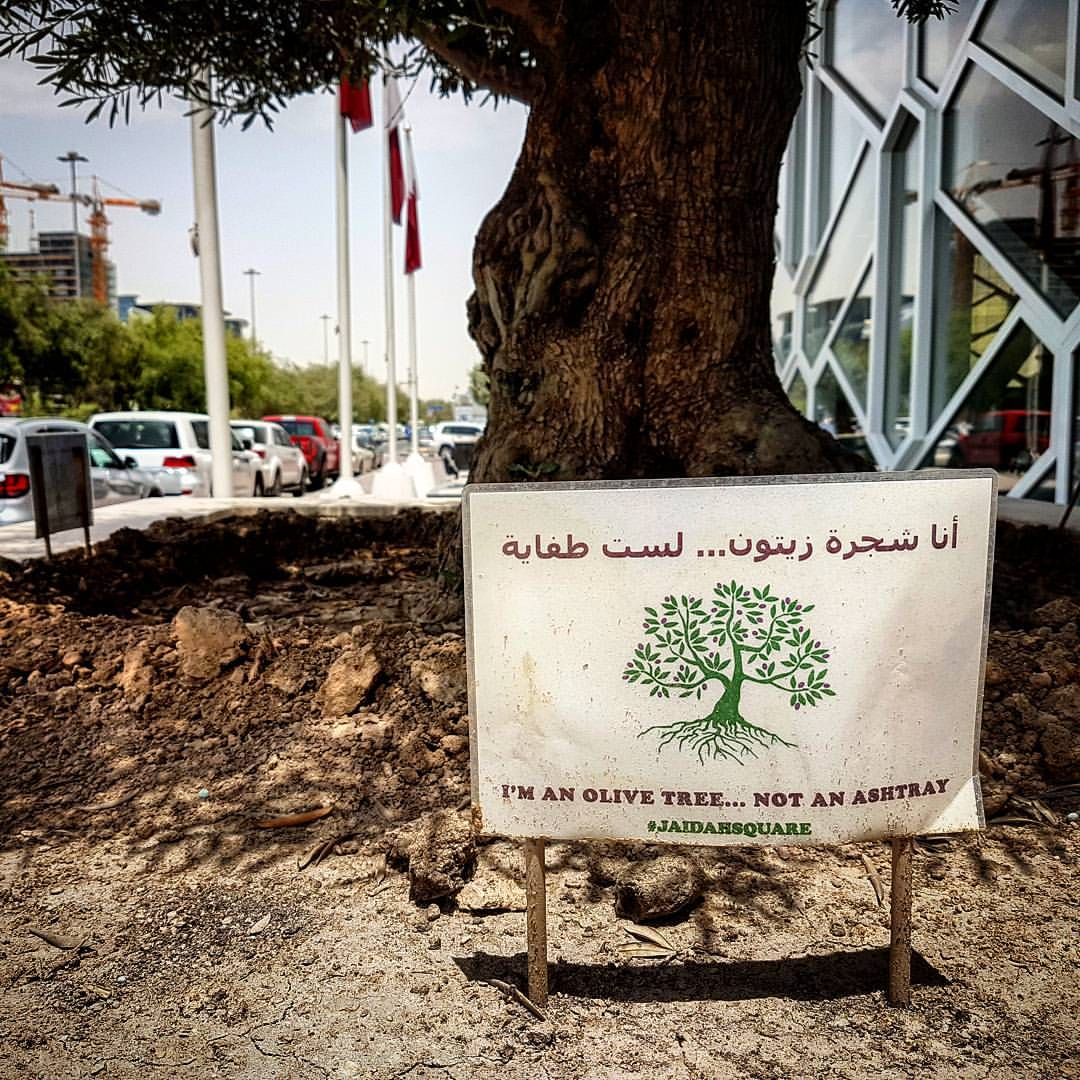
Al Jaidah Square on Old Airport Road

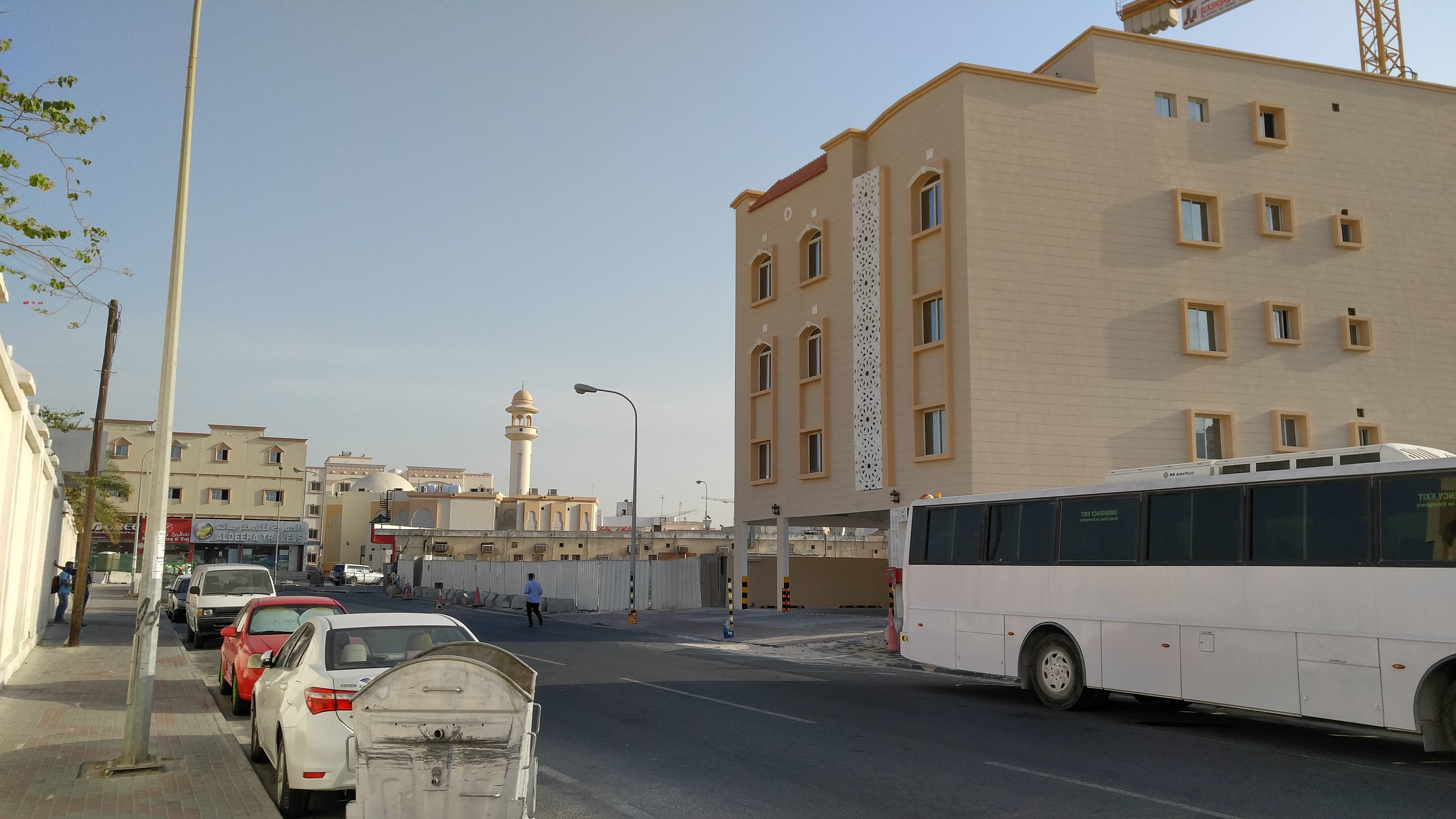
Buildings in Old Airport
