= Japan School of Doha =

Japanese international school in Doha

- ドーハ日本人学校 مدرسة اليابان في الدوحة

Location
- Site No.29 West Al Nasiriya, Doha, Qatar; 25.32742°N 51.386388°E

Information
- Website: jsdqatar.com

The Japan School of Doha (ドーハ日本人学校, Dōha Nihonjin Gakkō; "Doha Japanese School"; Arabic: مدرسة اليابان في الدوحة) is a Japanese international school located in Doha, Qatar.

== History ==
The previous Japanese school in Doha, which had opened in 1979 but was eventually closed in 2001 due to lack of students, and de-authorized by the Japanese Ministry of Education, Culture, Sports, Science and Technology (MEXT) on March 14, 2002 (Heisei 14).

It was opened in April 2009 in order to replace the previous Japanese school. MEXT re-authorized the school on December 26, 2008 (Heisei 20). Many Japanese companies, up to 2009, had opened new offices in Qatar because of an increase in demand for natural gas and crude oil, therefore expanding the expatriate population living in Qatar. The Qatari authorities wanted to enhance the teaching of the Japanese language and to allow the Japanese education style and culture to influence Qatar so it can shift into a manufacturing-based economy.

Qatari students became eligible to attend the school as it reopened, and the Qatari authorities provided the land and school building. Yousef Mohamed Bilal, the Ambassador of Qatar to Japan, stated that the school's reopening was one of the indications of strengthening Japan-Qatar relations. The school's reopening ceremony occurred on May 14, 2009. Various Qatari politicians attended the ceremony, including H.E. Abdullah Bin Hamad Al-Attiyah, the Deputy Prime Minister; H.E. Saad Bin Ibrahim Al-Mahmoud, the Minister of Education and Higher Education; and H.E. Dr. Mohamed Bin Saleh Al-Sada, the Minister of State for Energy and Industry.

In 2013 there were plans to further expand the school.

== See also ==
- Education in Qatar
- List of schools in Qatar
