= Umm Lekhba =

Umm Lekhba ام لخبا
- District
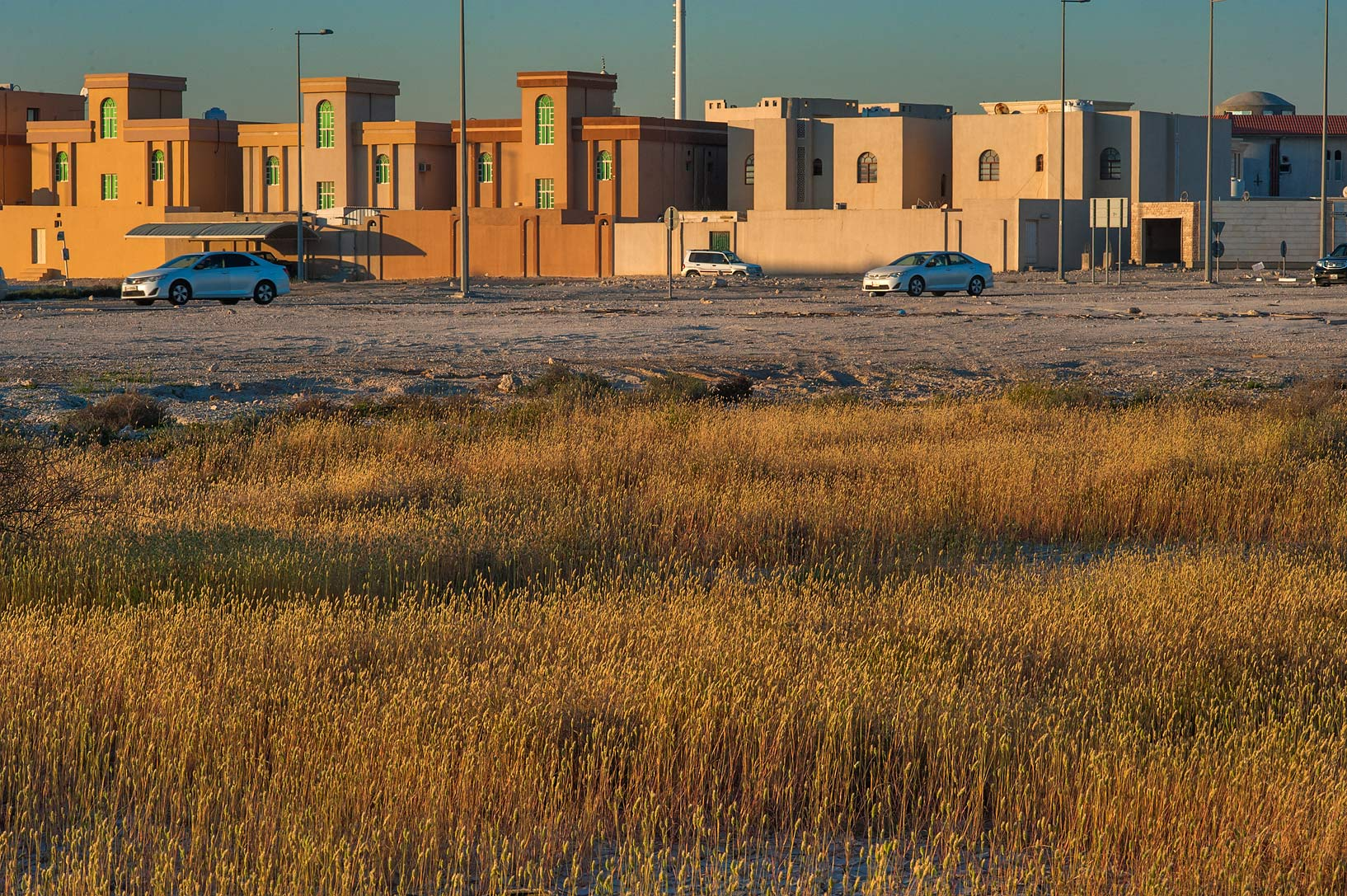
- Grass species Rostraria pumila growing in Umm Lekhba

- Location within Doha Location within Qatar
- Coordinates: 25°20′25″N 51°28′15″E
- Country: Qatar
- Municipality: Doha
- Zone: Zone 31
- District no.: 28

Area
  - Total: 3.1 km^{2} (1.2 sq mi)

Population (2010)
  - Total: 9,871
  - Density: 3,200/km^{2} (8,200/sq mi)

Umm Lekhba (Arabic: ام لخبا, romanized: Umm Lakhbā) is a Qatari district located in the municipality of Doha. It was previously known as Al Duhail South or, alternatively, as South Duhail.

== Etymology ==
In Arabic, umm means "mother", but in this context is used as a prefix for specific geographic features. The second portion of the name, Lekhba, originates from the Arabic word khabaa, which is translated as "to hide". This name was given in reference to the fact that the area is relatively discreet since it lies in a depression.

== Landmarks ==
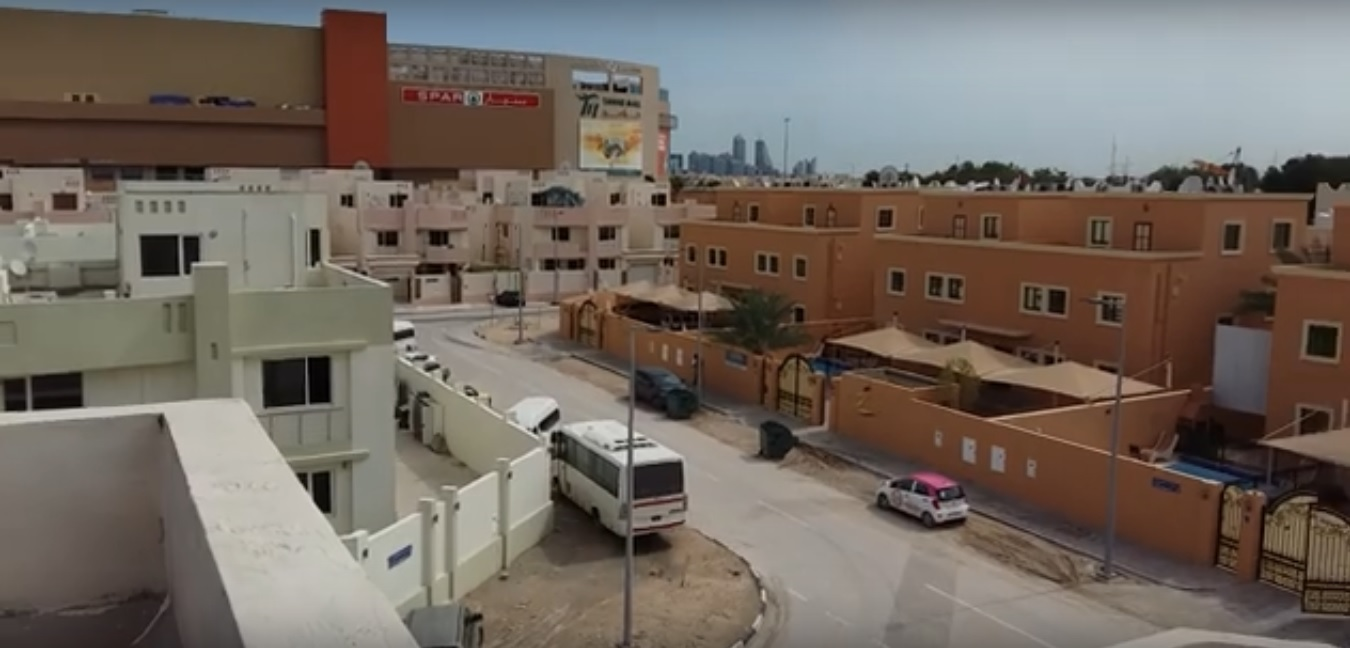
Aerial view of Umm Lekhba overlooking Tawar Mall

- Mercedes-Benz, Nasser Bin Khaled Automobiles on Al Uqouriyat Street.
- Hamad Medical Corporation Ambulance Service HQ on Al Markhiya Street.
- Tawar Mall on Al Markhiya Street opened in 2018 and covers an area of roughly 90,000 square meters.
- Shafallah Centre For Children With Special Needs on Zaid Bin Muhajer Street.

== Transport ==
Major roads that run through the district are Al Markhiya Street, Al Khafji Street, and Al Shamal Road.

== Demographics ==
As of the 2010 census, the district comprised 1,540 housing units and 331 establishments. There were 9,871 people living in the district, of which 51% were male and 49% were female. Out of the 9,871 inhabitants, 68% were 20 years of age or older and 32% were under the age of 20. The literacy rate stood at 97.3%.

Employed persons made up 55% of the total population. Females accounted for 40% of the working population, while males accounted for 60% of the working population.

Year	Population
1986	927
1997	1,493
2004	4,486
2010	9,871

== Education ==
The following schools are located in Umm Lekhba:

Name of School	Curriculum	Grade	Genders	Official Website	Ref
Al Andalus Secondary Private School for Boys	Independent	Secondary	Male-only	Official website	
Qatar Al-Hadeetha	Independent	Kindergarten	Both	N/A	
Qatar Canadian School	International	Kindergarten – Secondary	Both	Official website	
