= Al Hilal (district) =

Al Hilal الهلال
- District
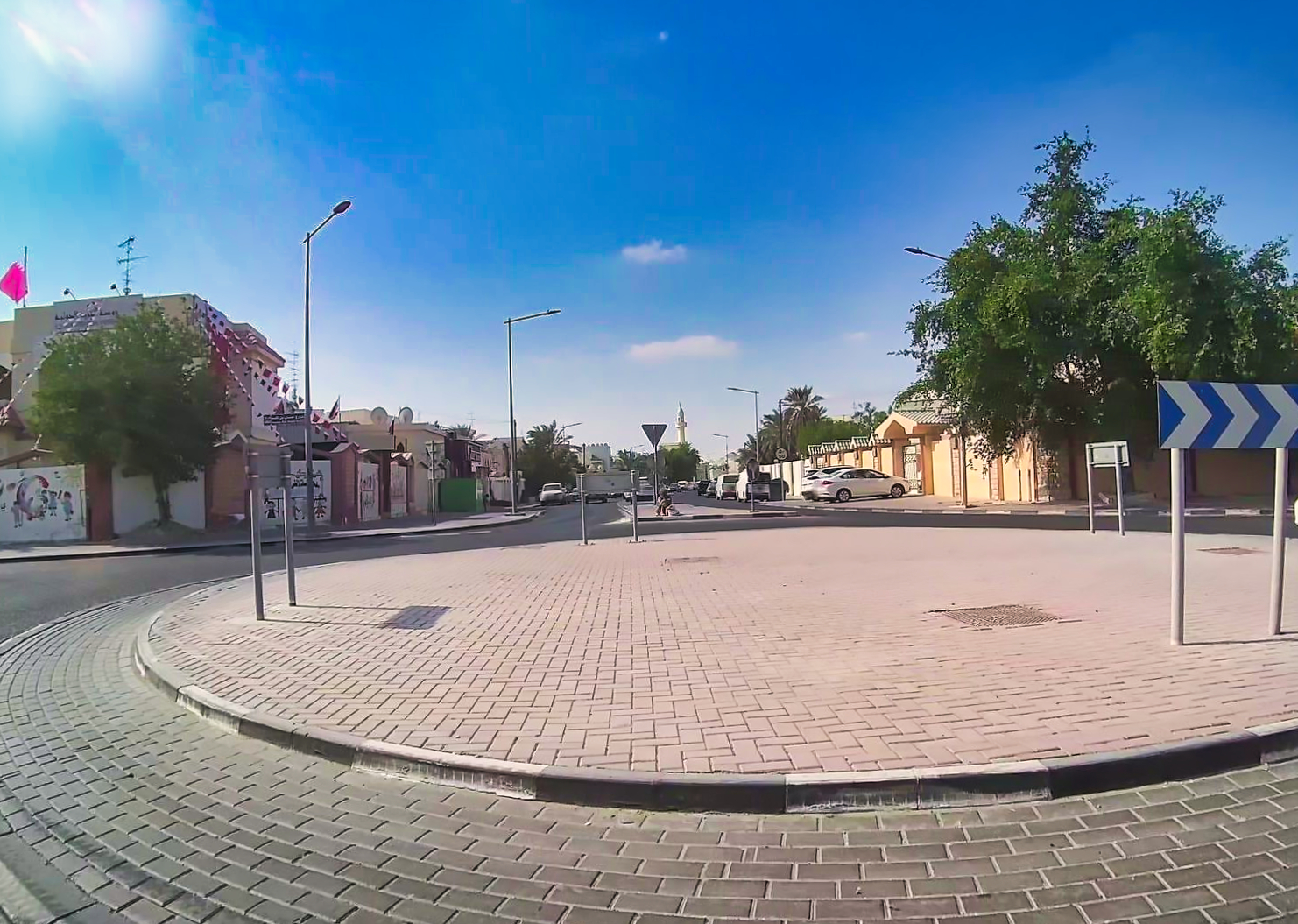
- Looking towards Al Salam Street in Al Hilal

- Al Hilal Al Hilal (Qatar)
- Coordinates: 25°17′12″N 51°32′0″E
- Country: Qatar
- Municipality: Doha
- Zone: Zone 42
- District no.: 43

Area
  - Total: 1.8 km^{2} (0.69 sq mi)

Population (2010)
  - Total: 11,257
  - Density: 6,300/km^{2} (16,000/sq mi)

Al Hilal (Arabic: الهلال) is a multipurpose district in central Doha. It is home to the Doha Mall, the city's first shopping centre. Prior to the 2010 census, Zone 41 comprised Al Hilal West, but the zone was later transferred to Nuaija. Many sizable residences are situated here, and the Embassy of India, Doha formerly had its headquarters here.

== Geography ==
Al Hilal borders the following districts:

- Old Airport to the south, separated by D Ring Road.
- Doha International Airport to the east, separated by Airport Street.
- Najma to the north, separated by C Ring Road.
- Nuaija to the west, separated by Najma Street.

== Landmarks ==
- Linear Park.
- Al Hilal Park on Wadi Al Neel Street.
- Focus Medical Centre on Najma Street.
- Plastic Surgicentre on Najma Street.
- Medcare Clinic on Al Salam Street.
- Al Shefa Polyclinic on D Ring Road.
- Education Institute - Supreme Education Council on C Ring Road.
- United Parcel Service (UPS) Cargo on D Ring Road.
- Al Khansa Library for Women on D Ring Road.
- Al Manaa Tower on Al Matar Street.

== Transport ==
Major roads that run through the district are C Ring Road, D Ring Road, and Airport Street.

Currently, the underground Al Hilal Metro Station is under construction, having been launched during Phase 1A. Once completed, it will serve Doha Metro's Green Line and Blue Line.

== Demographics ==
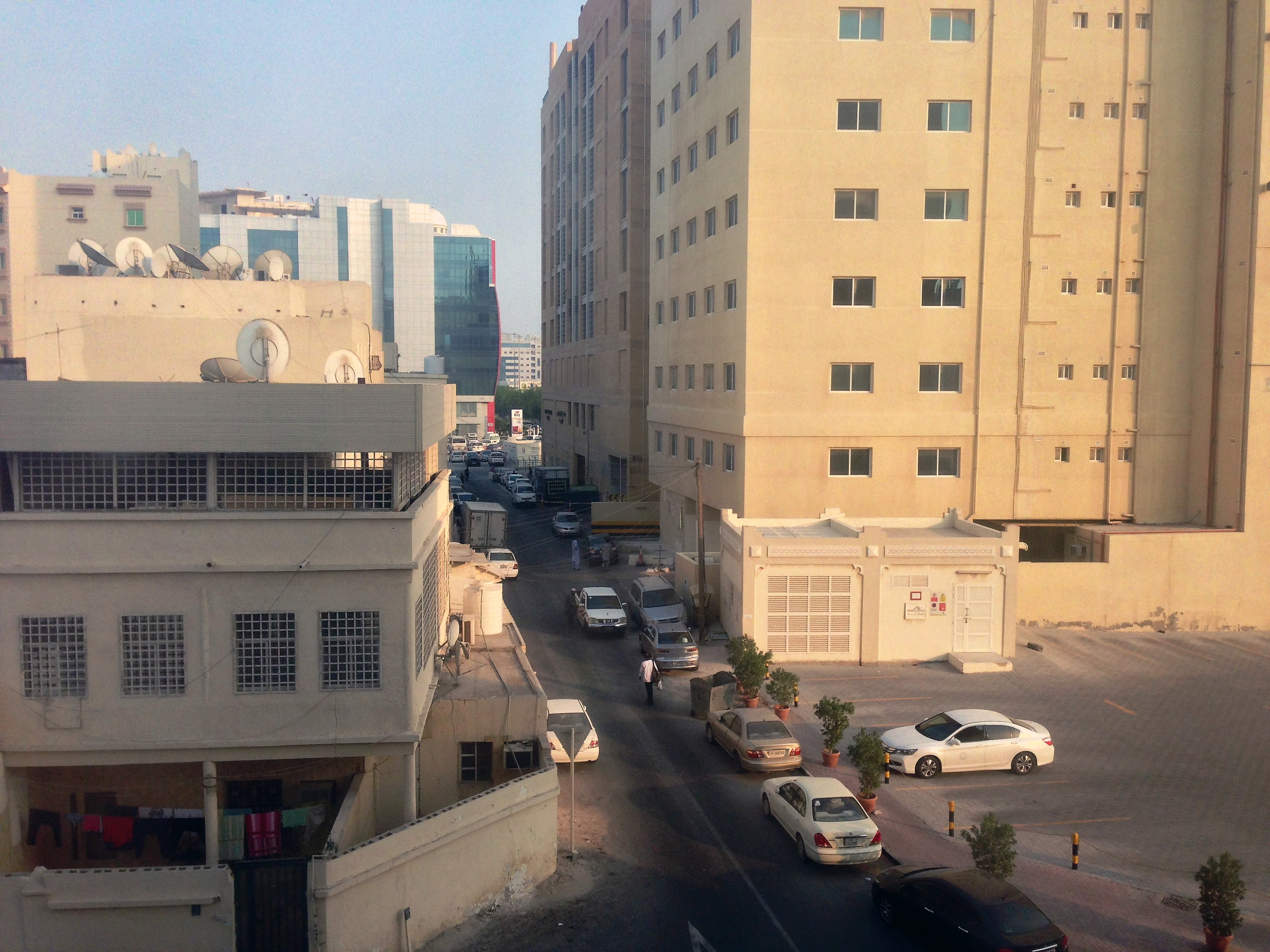
Residential area in Al Hilal

Year	Population
1986	4,907
1997	6,913
2004	8,567
2010	11,257

== Religion ==
=== Mosques ===
Seven public mosques are found in the district. They are:

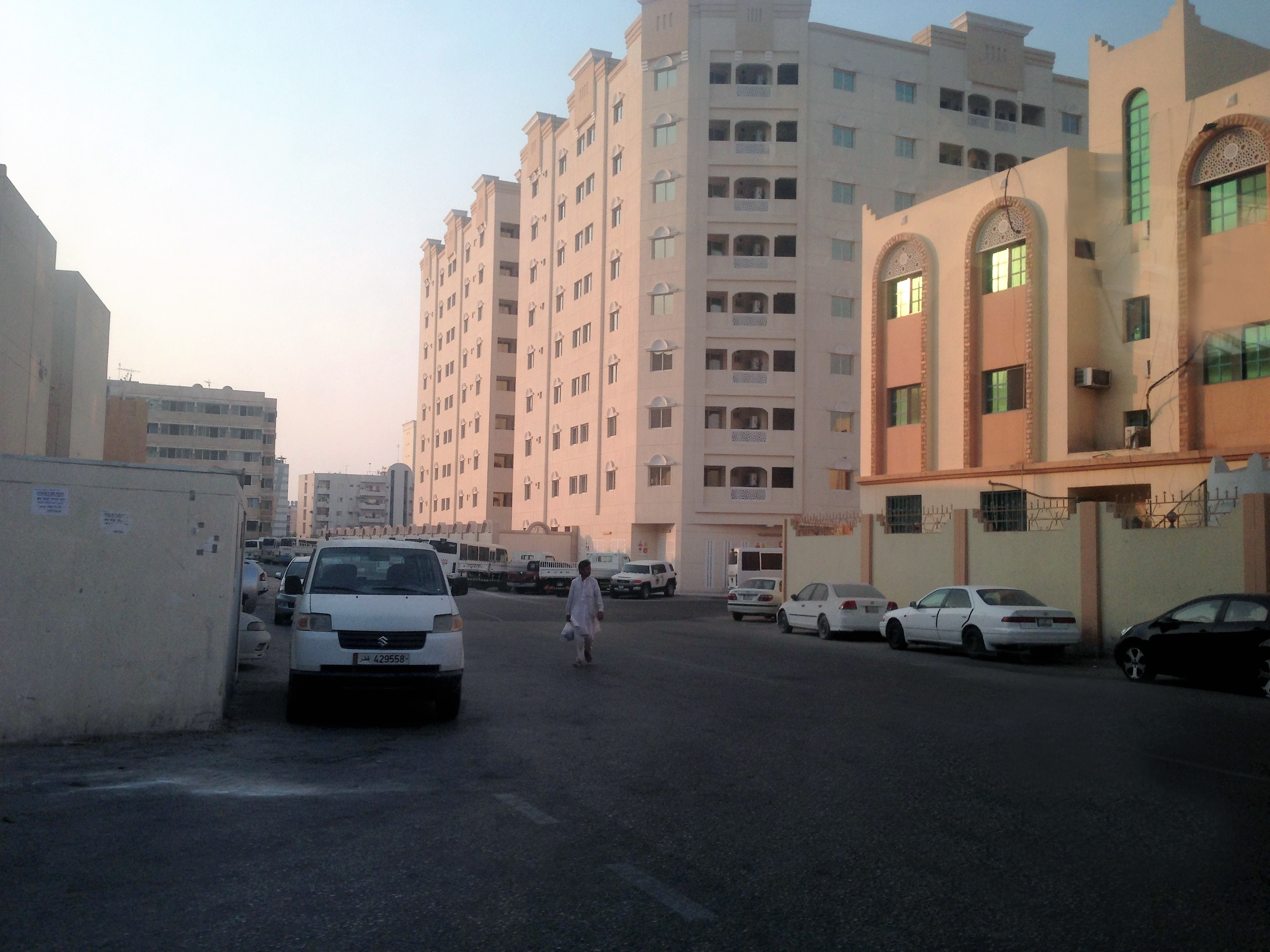
Apartment buildings in Al Hilal

Name of mosque	Mosque type	Location
Ahmad Mohammed Fahad Al Kuwari Mosque	Fardh Masjid	Al Salam Street
Al Mqdad Bin Al Aswad Mosque	Jumaa Masjid	Abdul Qadir Al Jazairi Street
Hussain Bin Ali Kamal Mosque	Jumaa Masjid	Ibn Taymiya Street
Abdulrazaq Mohammed Rafi Al Sideeqi Mosque	Jumaa Masjid	Abdul Qadir Al Jazairi Street
Nasser Ali Majed Al Bader Mosque	Fardh Masjid	Ibn Al Alaa Street
Hessa Khamees Al Sulaiti Mosque	Fardh Masjid	Dareen Street
Khaled Hamad Abdulla Jassim Al Thani Mosque	Fardh Masjid	Al Matar Street

== Education ==
One of Qatar's largest public libraries is located in Al Hilal under the name Al Khansa Library for Women. Established in 1981, its collection consists of 60,000 Arabic-language books and 5,000 English-language books.

The following schools are located in Al Hilal:

Name of School	Curriculum	Grade	Genders	Official Website	Ref
Al Jazeera Kindergarten	Independent	Kindergarten	Both	N/A	
Al Thuraya Kindergarten	International	Kindergarten	Both	N/A	
Birla Public School - Al Hilal	International	Kindergarten – Secondary	Both	Official website	
Newton International School - Al Hilal	International	Kindergarten – Secondary	Both	Official website	
Step One Private Kindergarten	International	Kindergarten	Both	N/A	
