= German International School Doha =

Educational institution in Qatar

Coordinates: 25°15′21.0″N 51°30′4.2″E

- German: Deutsche Internationale Schule Doha; Arabic: المدرسة الألمانية الدولية

Information
- Established: 2008; 18 years ago
- Grades: Kindergarten - Grade 11
- Language: German
- Website: www.ds-doha.de/en/

German International School Doha (GIS Doha; German: Deutsche Internationale Schule Doha Arabic: المدرسة الألمانية الدولية, romanized: almadrasat al'almaniat aldawalia) is a German international school in Al Mamoura, Doha, Qatar. It serves Kindergarten through grade 11, and it was established in October 2008.
