= Al Mamoura =

Al Mamoura المعمورة
- District
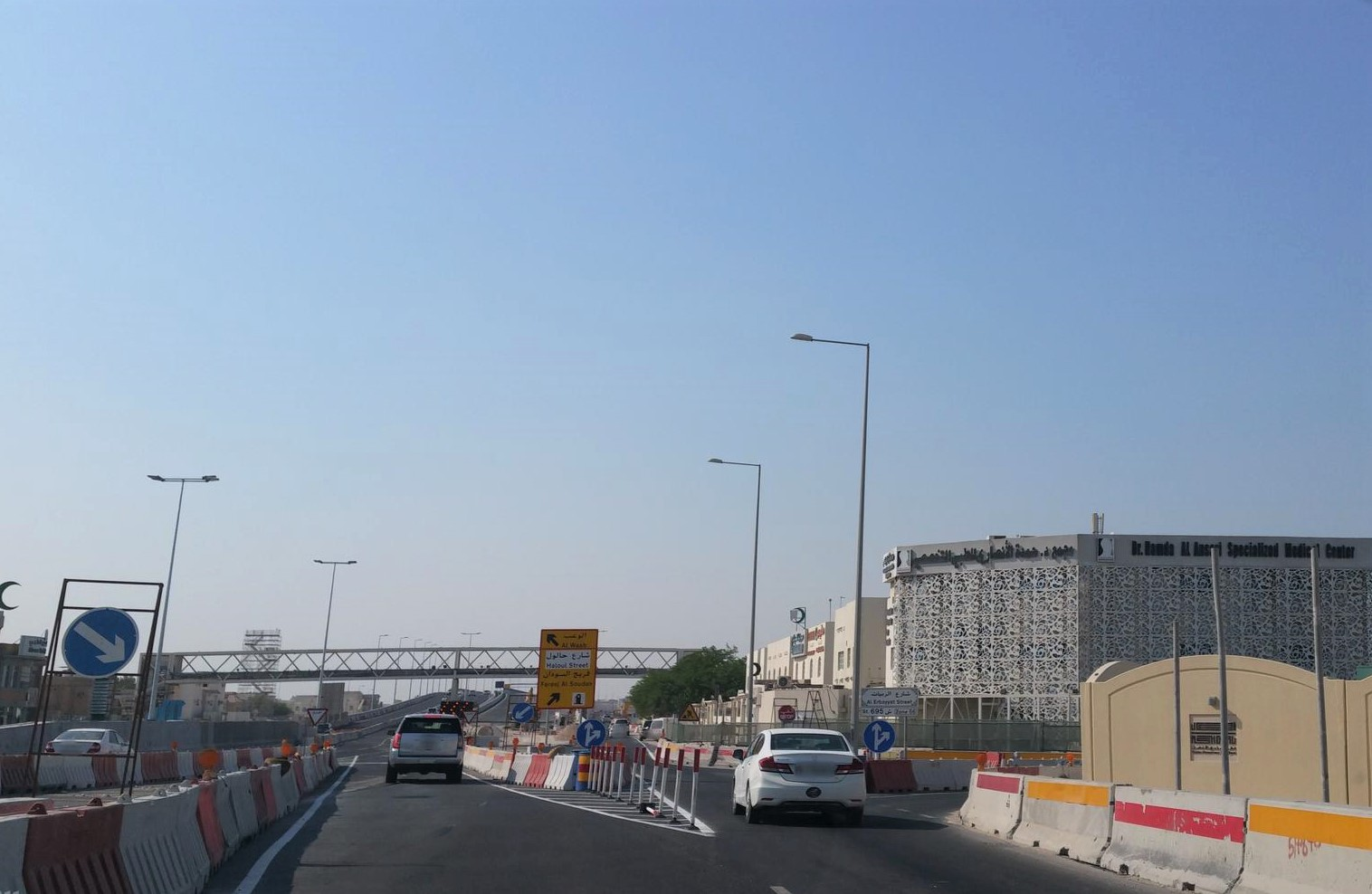
- View of Al Maamoura from Mesaimeer Road

- Location within Qatar
- Coordinates: 25°14′47″N 51°28′44″E
- Country: Qatar
- Municipality: Al Rayyan
- Zone: Zone 56
- District no.: 97

Area
  - Total: 6.8 km^{2} (2.6 sq mi)
- Elevation: 17 m (56 ft)

Al Mamoura (Arabic: المعمورة; also spelled Al Ma'amoura) is a Qatari district in the municipality of Al Rayyan. It houses many international schools and civil organizations.

== Landmarks ==
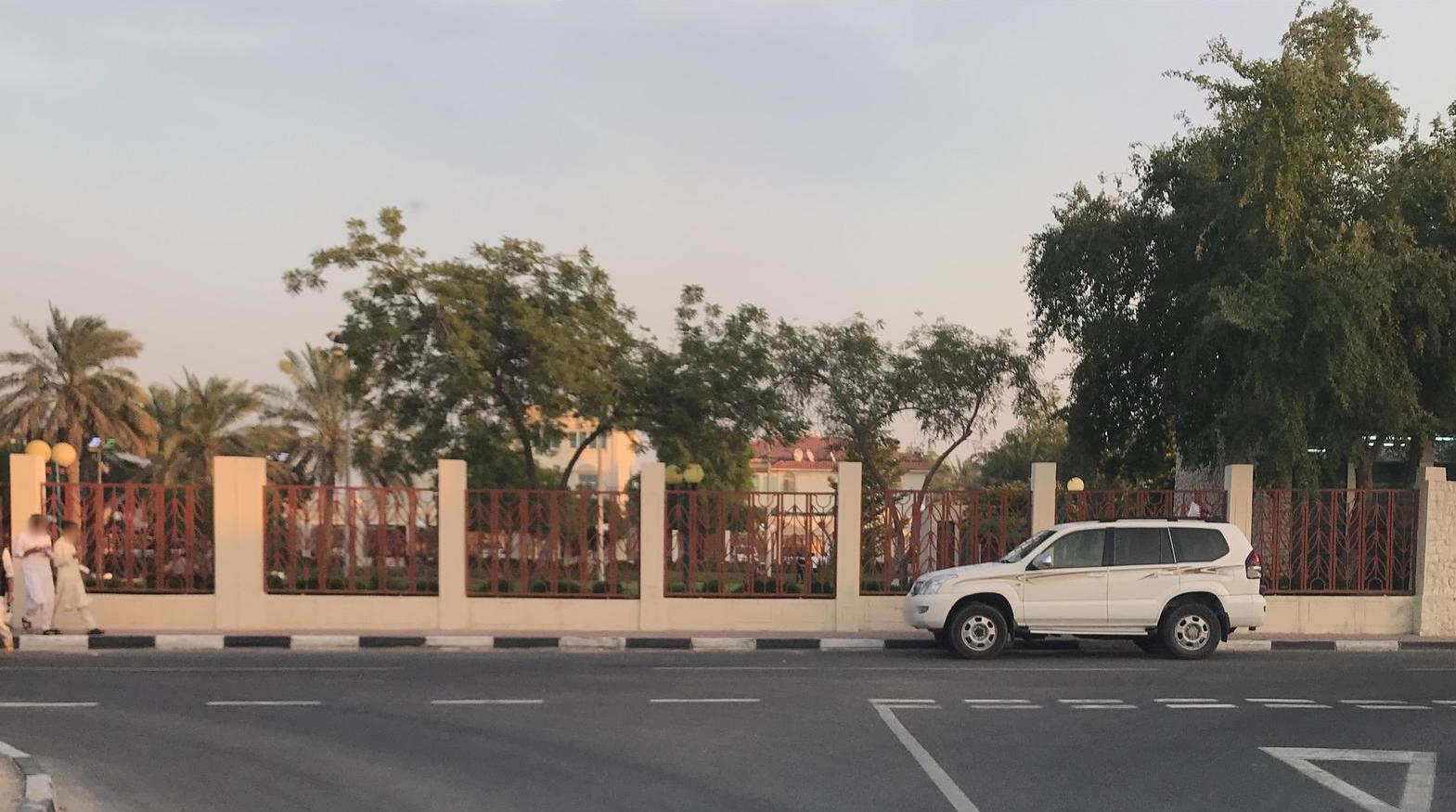
Outside view of Bu Samra Park.

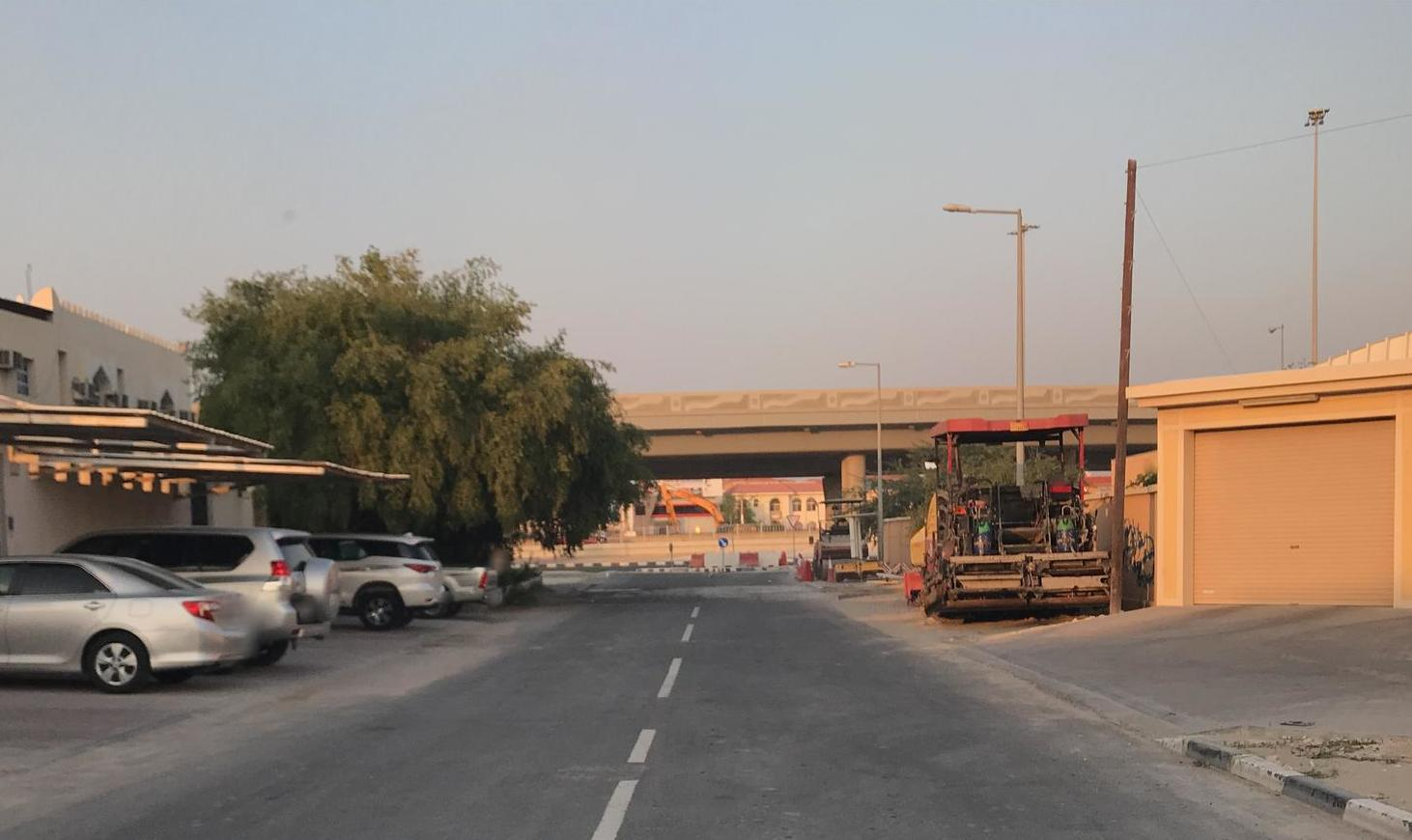
View of elevated D Ring Road from Ibn Al Fardi Street in Al Maamoura.

=== Government landmarks ===
- Al Mamoura Traffic Police and Faza Department on Wholesale Market Street.
- General Cleanliness Department of the Ministry of Municipality and Environment (MME) on D Ring Road.
- Mechanical Equipment Department of the MME on Abu Hamour Compound Street.
- Central Laboratories Department of the MME on Street 796.

=== Cultural and social landmarks ===
Dreama Empowerment for the Orphans is found on Al Afnan Street.

The Girls' Creativity Center is located in Al Mamoura. It was founded in 2001 as the Girls' Creative Art Center and renamed to its current name in 2003. Classes in arts and crafts are held at the center.

There is Indian Cultural Center in Al Mamoura. It is affiliated with the Embassy of India in Doha.

Qatar's Cultural Center for the Deaf is located here near the Wholesale Market. As a member of the World Federation of the Deaf, the center helps organize community activities, assists deaf individuals in obtaining employment, lobbies for deaf rights in the legislature, and provides education and training in the Qatari Unified Sign Language.

== Education ==
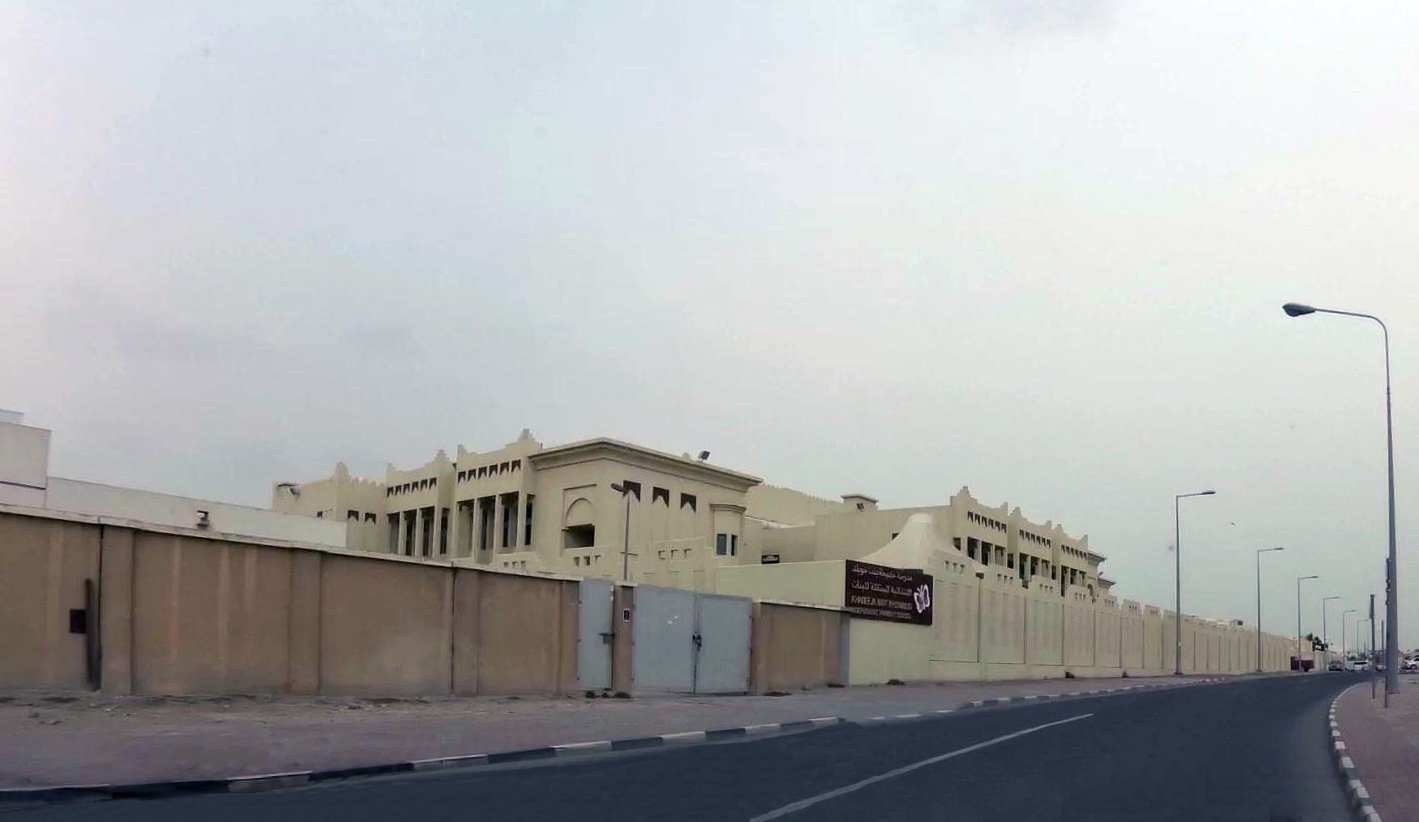
Khadija bint Khuwailid Primary Independent School for Girls on Salman bin Rabiah Street in Al Mamoura.

The following schools are located in Al Mamoura:

Name of School	Curriculum	Grade	Genders	Official Website	Ref
Al Bateel International Nursery	International	Kindergarten	Both	N/A	
Al Emam Secondary Independent Girls	Independent	Secondary	Female-only	N/A	
Al Falah Primary Independent Girls	Independent	Kindergarten – Primary	Female-only	N/A	
Al Sharq Al-Awsat International Private School	International	Kindergarten – Secondary	Both	N/A	
Cambridge School	International	Kindergarten – Secondary	Both	Official website	
Doha Academy - Al Mamoura	International	Kindergarten – Secondary	Both	Official website	
Doha International Kindergarten	International	Kindergarten	Both	N/A	
Egyptian Language School	International	Kindergarten – Secondary	Both	N/A	
German International School	International	Kindergarten – Secondary	Both	Official website	
Iqraa English School For Girls	International	Primary	Female-only	Official website	
Khadija bint Khuwailid Primary Independent School for Girls	Independent	Primary	Female-only	N/A	
The Phoenix Private School	International	Kindergarten – Secondary	Both	N/A	
Little Academy Nursery	International	Kindergarten	Both	Official website	
