= Ain Khaled =

Ain Khalid عين خالد
- District
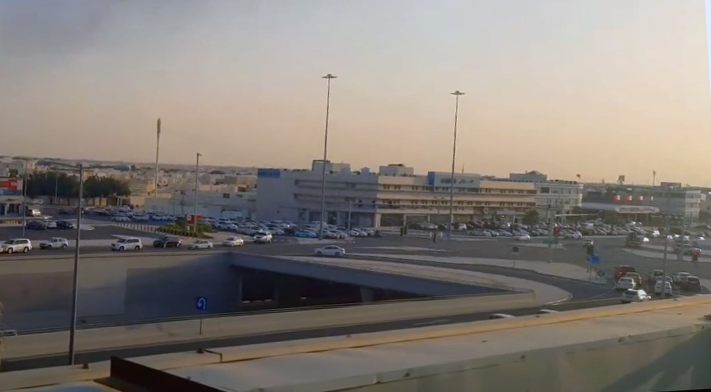
- Intersection of Salwa Road and Umm Al Seneem Street in Ain Khaled.

- Location within Qatar
- Coordinates: 25°13′00″N 51°27′00″E
- Country: Qatar
- Municipality: Al Rayyan
- Zone: Zone 56
- District no.: 95

Area
  - Total: 11.2 km^{2} (4.3 sq mi)
- Elevation: 24 m (79 ft)

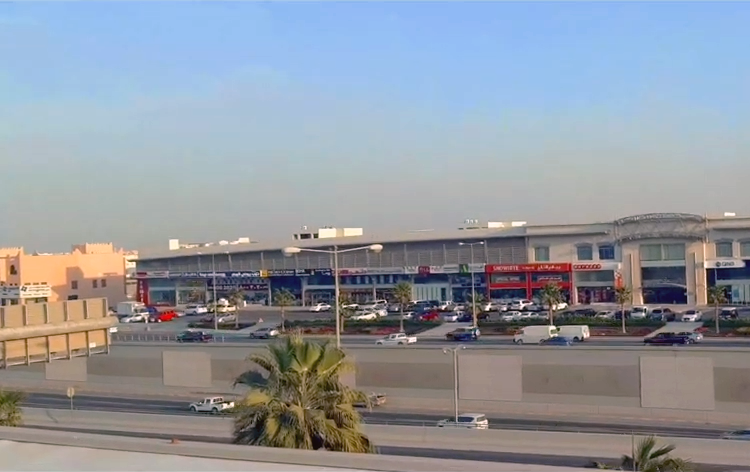
Shops on Salwa Road in Ain Khaled.

Ain Khaled (Arabic: عين خالد, romanized: ‘Ayn Khālid) is a Qatari district in the municipality of Al Rayyan. Located on the outskirts of the capital Doha, the area is historically known for its well which served the people of Doha and neighboring villages.

== Etymology ==
The first word in the district's name, ain, is an Arabic word reserved for natural underground water sources. Formerly, the district was known as "Ain Al Seneem", with "Al Seneem" being the name of a local well. However, the district's name was later changed to "Ain Khaled", in honor of a respected local who went by that name.

== Landmarks ==
- Fereej Ain Khaled Stadium, managed by the Qatar Olympic Committee, is located on Khaled bin Ahmed Street.
- Ain Khaled Family Park is located on Bu Ethnaiteen Street.
- Ain Khaled Gate Compound is located on Khaled bin Ahmed Street.
- The Ain Khaled Roundabout is a local landmark. With a total area of 1,200 m^{2}, the centerpiece of the roundabout is a traditional-style well with a pump powered by solar cells. Roughly half of the area of the roundabout is grassed while the other half is filled with decorative pebbles.

== Development ==
In 2009, Barwa Group launched a project to develop an 11 km-long commercial avenue in Ain Khaled.

== Education ==
The following schools are located in Ain Khaled:

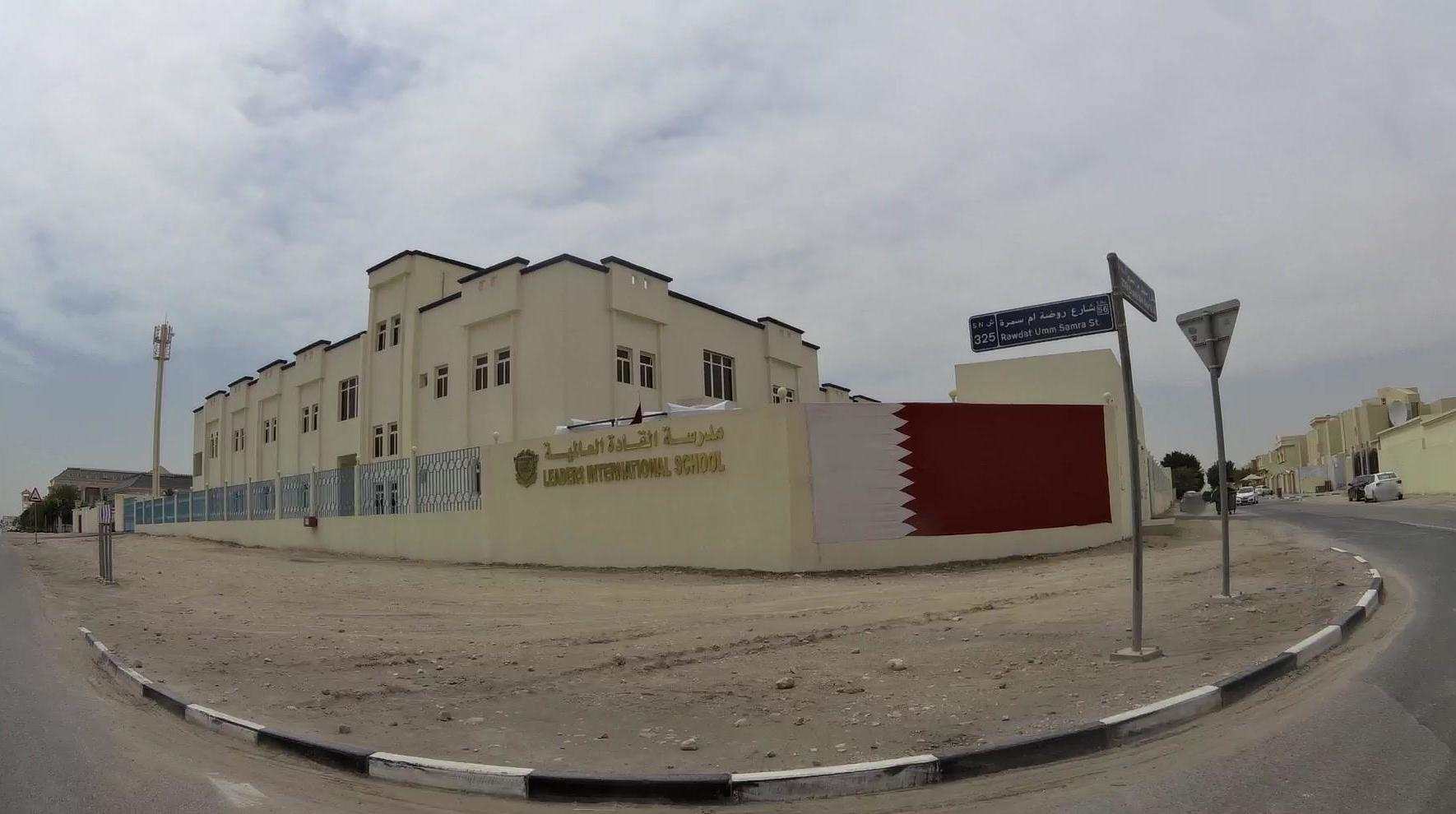
Leaders International School in Ain Khaled.

Name of School	Curriculum	Grade	Genders	Official Website	Ref
Al Maha Academy for Boys	International	Kindergarten – Secondary	Male-only	N/A	
Al Maha Academy for Girls	International	Kindergarten – Secondary	Female-only	N/A	
Ahmed bin Mohammed Secondary School	Independent	Secondary	Male-only	N/A	
Doha British School	International	Kindergarten – Secondary	Both	Official website	
Leaders International School	International	Kindergarten – Secondary	Both	N/A	
Philippine International School - Qatar	International	Kindergarten – Secondary	Both	Official website	
Jordanian Private School	International	Kindergarten – Secondary	Both	N/A	
