= Doha British School =

Doha British School (DBS)
- مدرسة الدوحة البريطانية
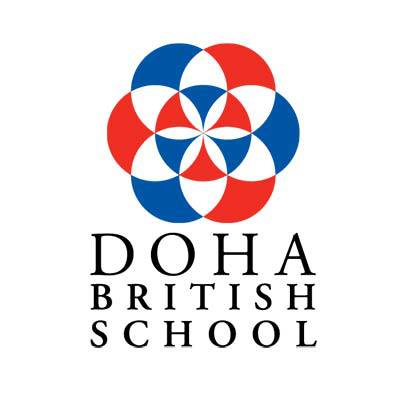
- Doha, P.O. Box 6142; Qatar

Information
- Former name: Doha Montessori British School (DMBS)
- Type: British/International School
- Mottoes: Shaping Futures, Building Dreams
- Religious affiliation: none
- Established: 1997
- Founder: Natra Al-Naimi
- Local authority: Ministry of Education and Higher Education (Qatar)
- Principal: Lynette Grant (Ain Khaled), Rob Khan(Rawdat Al Hamama), Andrew Hurst (Al Wakra
- Head teacher: Head Teacher Primary: Marie Sibley (Ain Khaled), Jonathan Kutts (Al Wakra), Felice Kelly (Rawdat Al Hamama); Head Teacher Secondary - Moahmad Salam (Al Wakra, Alicia Hill (Rawdat Al Hamama)
- Grades: Preschool - Year 13
- Gender: Co-educational
- Age: 3 to 18
- Enrollment: 2800
- Classes offered: English (Language and Literature); Mathematics; Sciences (Biology, Chemistry, Physics); Modern Foreign Languages (Spanish, French, Arabic); Fine Arts, Textiles & Design; Design & Technology; History; Geography; Business Studies; Computer Science; Information Technology; Environmental Systems and Societies; Physical Education; Music; Drama; Islamic Studies; Qatar History (English/Arabic)
- Language: English (UK)
- Houses: Red Oryx; Purple Camels , Green Scorpions; Blue Arabian Horses; Yellow Falcons
- Mascot: Lions
- Accreditations: Edexcel (Pearson); Council of International Schools; BSME; IB World School; British Schools Overseas (BSO); QNSA
- Website: www.dohabritishschool.com

Doha British School (DBS), established and opened in October 1997, is a co-educational, comprehensive, International multi-campus school in Doha, Qatar. Across its campuses, the school offers British & International education to students from pre-school to Year 13. The students are of over 85 nationalities.

== History ==
Doha British School was originally known as Doha Montessori and British School (DMBS) before it was re-branded in November 2011. The school delivers the National Curriculum for England throughout primary and secondary school, giving students the opportunity to complete International General Certificate of Secondary Education (International GCSE) qualifications during Years 10 and 11.

Doha British School offers both the International Baccalaureate Diploma Programme and national A Level to its sixth form students in Years 12 and 13. The institution became an IB World School in March 2010 and has since been delivering the diploma programme with a range of subjects for its students as a school-leaving qualification option. In September 2015, the AS Level (first year of the GCE A Level) award was introduced as another option for students to provide students with choice. DBS additionally provides BTEC options for its sixth form students.

The school is a member of the Duke of Edinburgh International Award.

The school was a founder member of the inter-school organisation British Schools of Qatar, set up during the 2017-2021 Qatar diplomatic crisis when Qatar's BSME schools could not participate in BSME Games hosted in countries blockading the country. DBS was one of the organisers of the first BISQ Games, hosted at Aspire Zone in 2018.

== Campuses ==
All Doha British School campuses are CIS, QNSA and BSO accredited. DBS is a member of BSME and is managed by ACES (Artan Consulting and Education Services).

=== Ain Khaled Campus ===
The first official purpose-built campus in Doha British School's history, the Ain Khaled Campus building was opened in January 2008, and provides British curriculum education to students from the age of 3 through to 19 years of age. Students can choose their subjects at IGCSE and have four pathways at sixth form: AS, A-Level, the IB diploma programme and BTEC.

=== Al Wakrah Campus ===
The first campus built in DBS' expansion of its educational offerings across Qatar, the Al Wakrah campus offers education for children from the levels of pre-school to Year 7, as of the 2017–18 academic year. DBS opened a secondary school in Al Wakrah from Year 7 to Year 12. On 1 September 2024, DBS Al Wakra moved to its new facility with a provision for over 1,200 students.

=== Rawdat Al Hamama Campus ===
With the establishment and launching of Lusail City ahead of the FIFA 2022 World Cup, DBS established its Rawdat Al Hamama campus in 2022. The school provides British curriculum education to students from the age of 3 through to 17 years of age. IGCSE, and AS level.
