= Blyth Academy Qatar =

Coordinates: 25°20′47.2″N 51°28′36.2″E

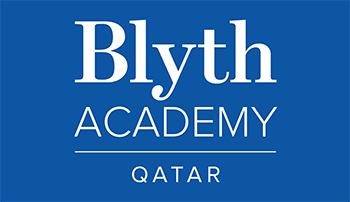

Location
- Umm Lekhba 31 Zaid bin al Mohajer St. 810, Building 45; Doha; Qatar

Information
- Type: Private School
- Motto: We prepare each student to become a global citizen who can 'Shape the World'
- Established: 2006
- Principal: Rhonda Murphy
- Grades: JK-12
- Enrollment: < 500
- Website: blythacademyqatar.com

Blyth Academy Qatar (BAQ), formerly the Qatar Canadian School, is a private JK-12 international school in Doha, Qatar. BAQ has existed since 2006, and has carried the Alberta accreditation since 2010. The school operates from grades kindergarten to grade 12.

== Curriculum ==
Blyth Academy Qatar is accredited by the Ministry of Education of Alberta, Canada, and the Ministry of Education of the State of Qatar. BAQ follows the Alberta curriculum which is widely recognized and ranks amongst the top educational systems in the world. Students obtaining an Alberta Secondary School Diploma are accepted to universities and colleges across the world.
