= Newton International School =

Coordinates: 25°15′13″N 51°31′07″E

Newton International Academy
- Doha; Qatar

Information
- Type: Private
- Motto: Striving for excellence, celebrating success.
- Established: 2006
- Grades: Kindergarten-Sixth Form
- Houses: Wright; Curie; Bell; Edison
- Colours: Navy, White and Green.
- Website: newtonschools.sch.qa

Newton International Academy is a private school located in Doha, Qatar. All pupils follow the National Curriculum of England and Wales.

The school was founded in 2006. There are several branches in the city of Doha, Collectively known as the Newton group.
