= Nuaija =

Nuaija نعيجة
- District
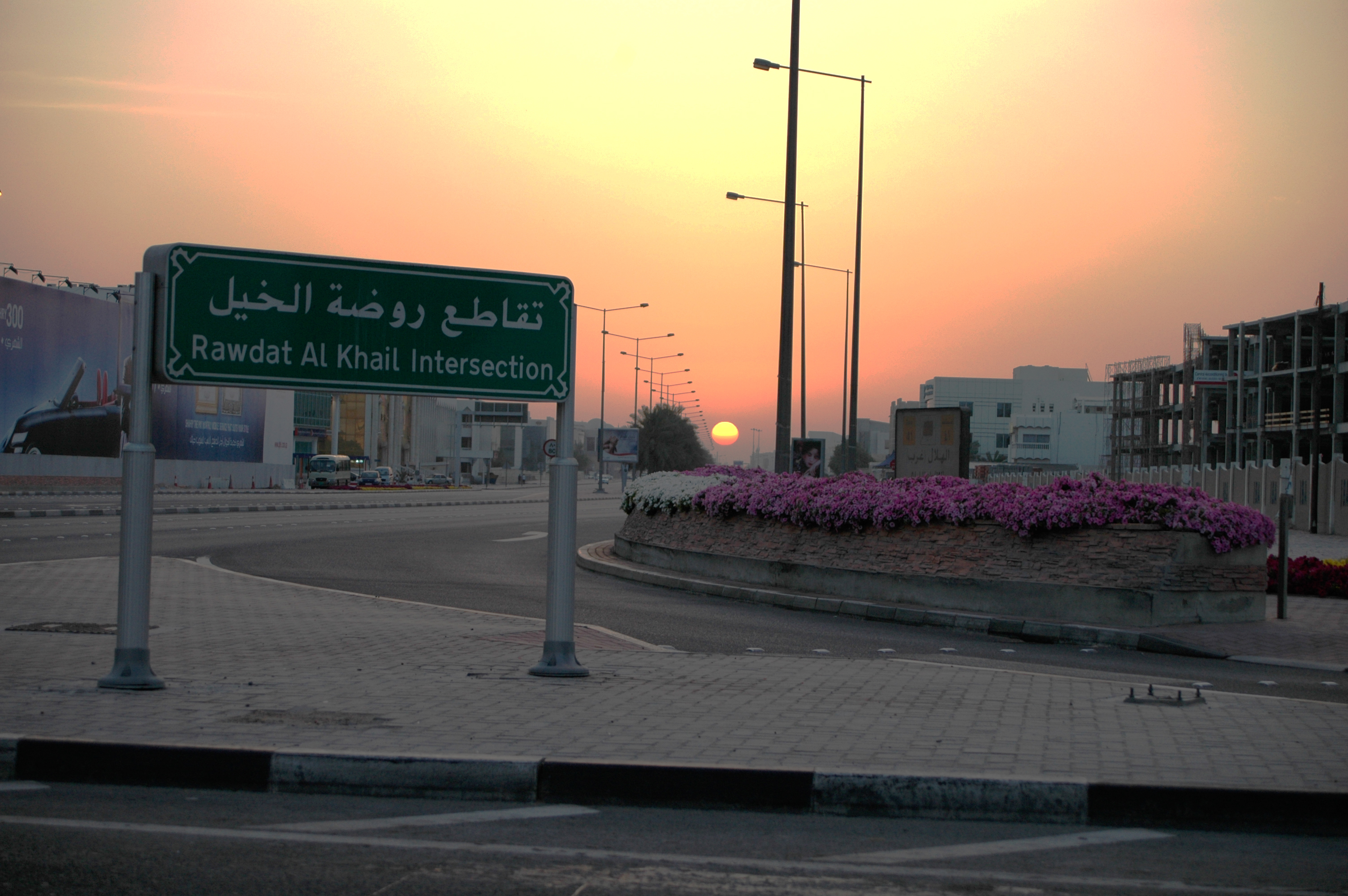
- Looking towards Zone 41 of Nuaija at Rawdat Al Khail Intersection

- Location within Doha Location within Qatar
- Coordinates: 25°15′9″N 51°33′33″E
- Country: Qatar
- Municipality: Doha
- Zone: Zone 41, Zone 43, Zone 44
- District no.: 42

Area
  - Total: 6.3 km^{2} (2.4 sq mi)

Population (2010)
  - Total: 29,703
  - Density: 4,700/km^{2} (12,000/sq mi)

Nuaija (Arabic: نعيجة, romanized: Nu‘ayjah) is a Qatari district in the municipality of Doha. One of Nuaija's zones, Zone 41, was formerly known as Al Hilal West but was incorporated into Nuaija as of the 2010 census. Municipal authorities are developing district as a major mixed-use hub for south-central Doha.

== Etymology ==
According to local tradition, the district's name is derived from the Arabic word naaja meaning "female sheep", with the association attributed to a well in the area that was reputed to produce water "as sweet as sheep's milk".

== History ==
Nuaija's first mention may be in an 1867 account by Captain C. G. Constable and A. W. Stiffe in which they mention "a tower near wells, with little cultivation" near Al Bidda, though this remains inconclusive.

In the summer of 1885, amidst a war between Qatar and the Emirate of Abu Dhabi, tribesmen of the Al Bu Shaar branch of the Manasir tribe, affiliated with Zayed bin Khalifa Al Nahyan, conducted a raid on Bedouin encampments loyal to Jassim bin Mohammed Al Thani at Nuaija. This incursion resulted in the abduction of three female slaves. In retaliation, several tribes loyal to Jassim traveled to Abu Dhabi territory, specifically targeting the Al Bu Shaar residents and stealing their camels, which they sold at the market of Al Bidda.

Another raid on Nuaija soon followed. In February 1888, approximately 400 fighting men of the Manasir arrived in Nuaija. During their raid, they captured 40 slaves, while another raid outside the confines of Al Bidda saw the capture of a few more slaves. Jassim bin Mohammed's forces attempted to apprehend the Manasir but to no avail.

In J.G. Lorimer's Gazetteer of the Persian Gulf in 1907, Nuaija was described as place 3 miles from the town of Al Bidda from whence the town derived its water supply. He remarked that Nuaija would have to be garrisoned if an external force who invaded Al Bidda were to retain possession of the town. He also states that date palms are grown in the area. Nuaija's wells retained their importance as a water source for the people throughout the century, as wells in other areas were often found to contain water unsuitable for drinking. This abundance of groundwater was used to cultivate the area too, resulting in numerous farms. Among all of Doha's old wells, Nuaija's is the only one still standing.

As the area is rich in bird fauna, it was a historically popular area for falconry and bird watching among locals until its rapid development in the later 20th century. In the 1980s, the district contained the main wastewater treatment plant for all of Doha. This was used to irrigate the numerous landscaped areas found throughout the municipality at the time.

== Historic architecture ==
Nuaija contains what is believed to be one of the only remaining zajara wells in Qatar, used before the introduction of mechanical pumps. Several other hydrologic-related historic structures have been observed in Nuaija, including wells, water tanks and irrigation channels. Additionally, a majlis building with an adjoining bathroom was found, which was atypical for majlises at the time. Two horse stables have also been uncovered.

== Transport ==
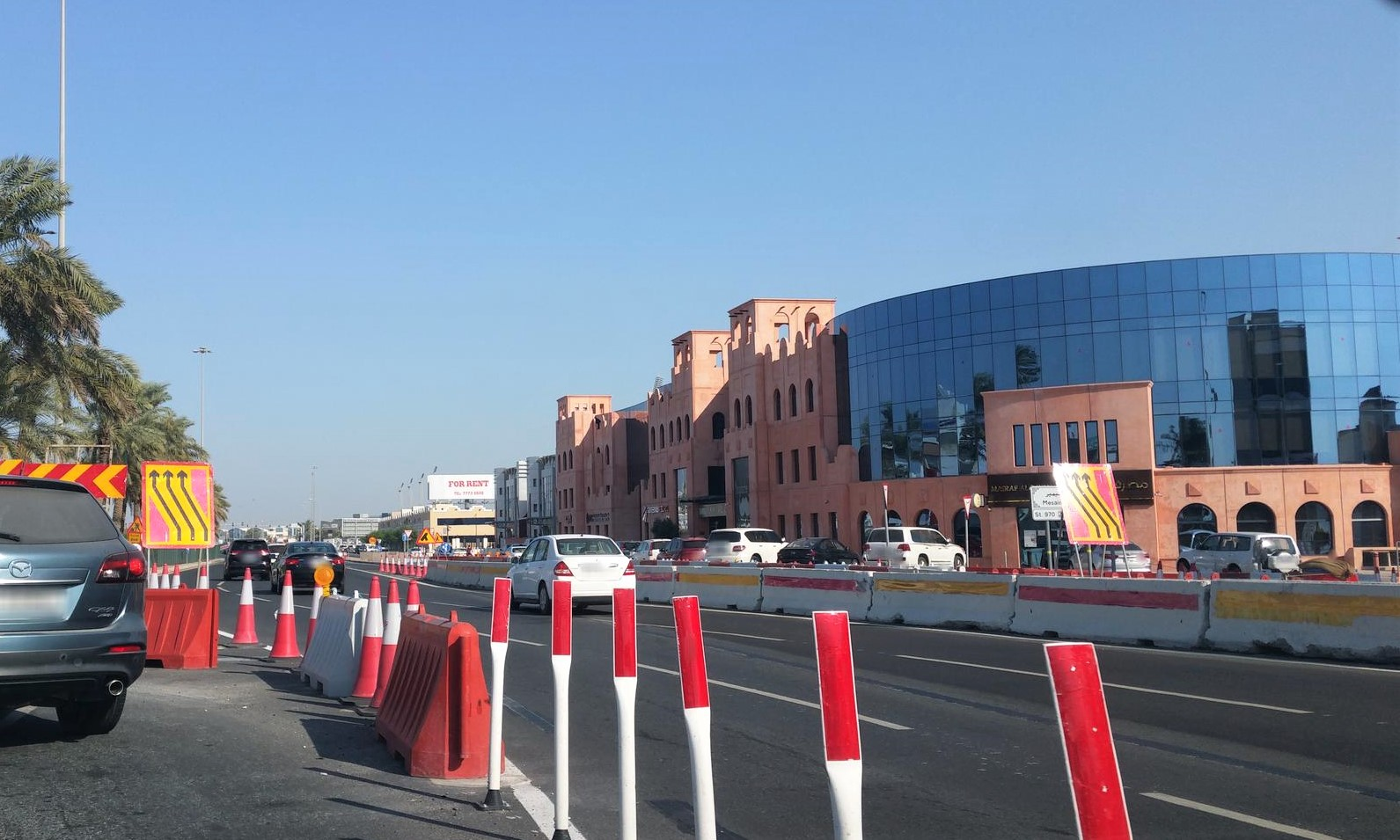
D Ring Road in Nuaija 44

Major roads that run through the district are Najma Street, Haloul Street, Rawdat Al Khail Street, C Ring Road, D Ring Road, E Ring Road and Salwa Road.

== Qatar National Master Plan ==
The Qatar National Master Plan (QNMP) is described as a "spatial representation of the Qatar National Vision 2030". As part of the QNMP's Urban Centre plan, which aims to implement development strategies in 28 central hubs that will serve their surrounding communities, Nuaija has been designated a District Centre, which is the lowest designation.

The District Centre encompasses the intersection of Najma Street and D ring Road. One of the longer-term objectives set out by the plan is the construction of a green highway to the Industrial Area sometime in the 2030s. Environmental sustainability is a key goal of the plan.

== Demographics ==
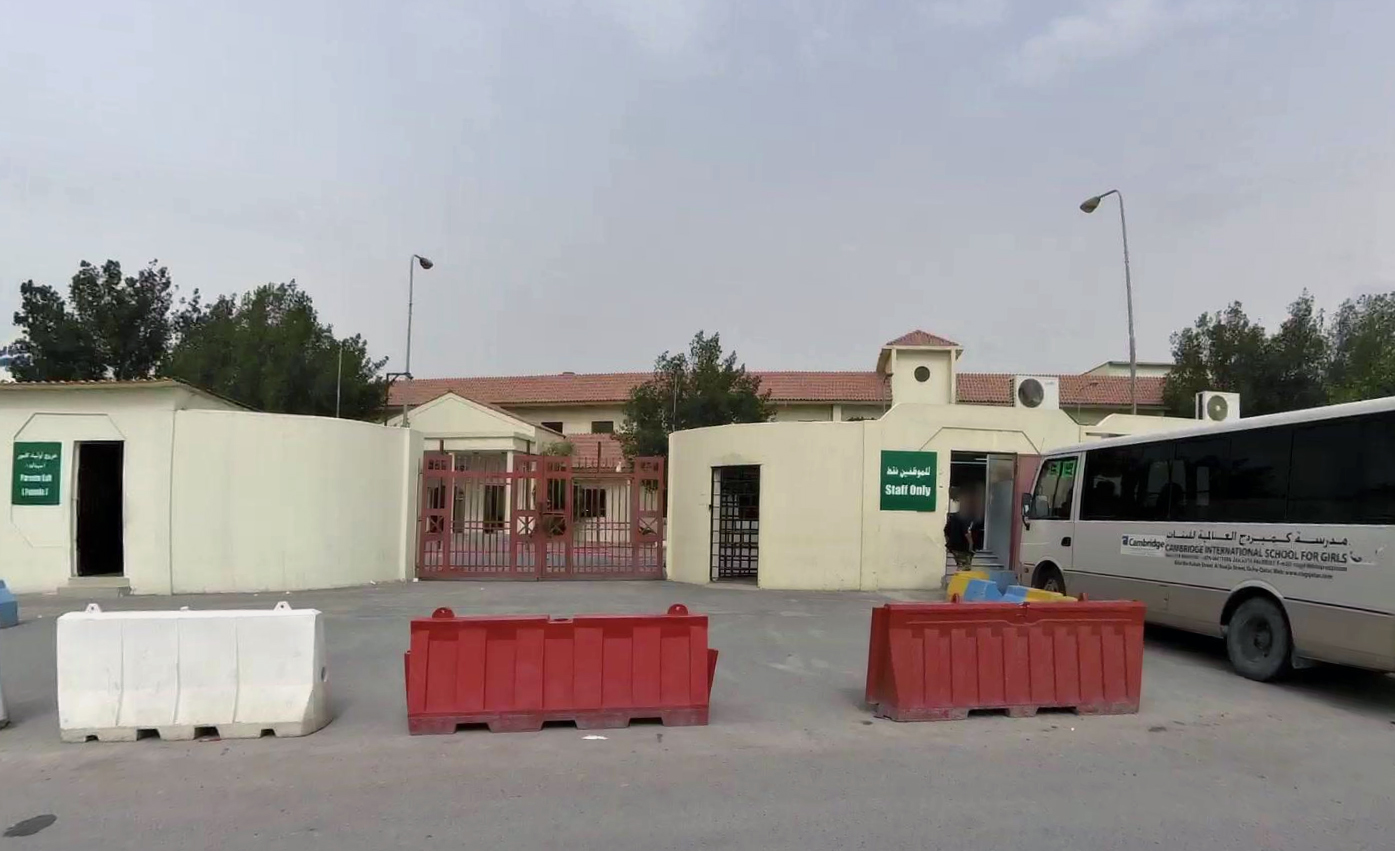
Cambridge International School for Girls in Nuaija

As of the 2010 census, the district comprised 4,525 housing units and 401 establishments. There were 29,703 people living in the district, of which 53% were male and 47% were female. Out of the 29,703 inhabitants, 72% were 20 years of age or older and 28% were under the age of 20.

Employed persons made up 55% of the total population. Females accounted for 37% of the working population, while males accounted for 63% of the working population.

== Education ==
The following schools are located in Nuaija:

Name of School	Curriculum	Grade	Genders	Official Website	Ref
Cambridge International School for Girls	International	Kindergarten – Secondary	Female-only	Official website	
Iranian School for Girls	International	Kindergarten – Secondary	Female-only	N/A	
Iqraa English Kindergarten	International	Kindergarten	Both	Official website	
Summit Academy Kindergarten	International	Kindergarten	Both	N/A	
Step One School	International	Primary	Both	N/A	
