= Doha Academy =

Private School in Doha, Qatar

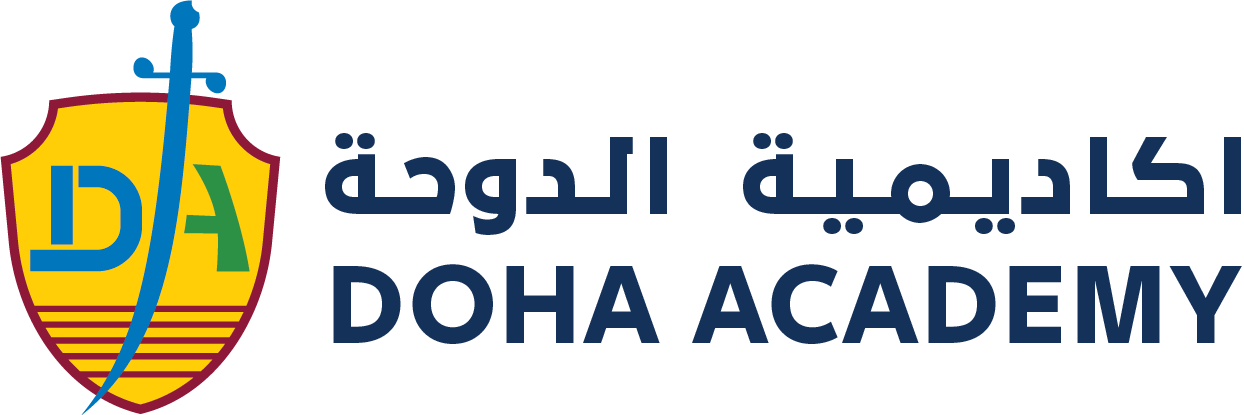
- Doha; Qatar

Information
- School type: International private school (following the national curriculum for England)
- Opened: September 2000
- Founder: Sheikha Aisha bint Faleh bin Nasser Al Thani
- Years offered: KG to 13
- Gender: Primary (mixed) secondary sections (separate: boys and girls sections)
- Age range: 3 to 18+
- Average class size: 23
- Colours: Uniform: white and navy blue
- Accreditation: Cambridge - EDEXCEL Examination Centre - QNSA (Qatar National School Accreditation)
- Feeder to: Doha Academy (Salwa Branch) and Doha International Kindergarten
- Website: www.dohaacademy.sch.qa

Al Faleh Educational Holding
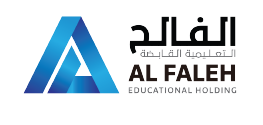
- Website: https://www.alfaleh.edu.qa

Doha Academy is an independent, privately owned day school situated in Doha, Qatar. It is open to students aged 3 – 18 or Kindergarten to Year 13, and follows the national curriculum for England. The school prepares students for the University of Cambridge International and EDEXCEL examinations (IGCSE at Year 11 & AS Level at Years 12).

Doha Academy opened in September 2000. The school is supported by the Al-Faleh Training Centre and administered by the board of directors chaired by Sheikha Aisha Bint Faleh Al Thani, a board member of SEC and ROTA.

Doha Academy is a Muslim institution of education, integrating academic and religious curricula for students to learn and grow with Islamic values and live in harmony with their Islamic beliefs in any society.

Boys and girls are separated in classes from year 6 upwards. The school offers a British-based curriculum combined with Islamic teachings from preschool through to year 13. The school attracts students from Qatar and further afield including other Middle Eastern countries, Indonesia, Malaysia, Europe, The United States, Canada, and Australia reflecting diversity within the Muslim Ummah.

Doha Academy has five divisions on three campuses: Al Waab Campus Primary Section, Al Waab Campus Secondary Boys' Section, Al Waab Campus Secondary Girls' Section, Salwa Campus and Doha International Kindergarten.

== The founder ==
Doctor Sheikha Aisha bint Faleh bin Nasser Al-Thani is a member of Qatar Supreme Education Council, serving a second term. The Supreme Education Council is the highest educational authority in Qatar and its members are drawn from Qatar and international leaders in government, business, and academia.

She is the chairperson and founder of Al Faleh Group. Three schools, including Doha Academy, fall under the group's umbrella. The Al Faleh Training Centre is also a member of the group; it is a centre that offers teacher training courses. Each year, the group organises a conference tackling educational issues.

She also serves as a member of the board of directors of the Zaytuna Institute and Zaytuna College in the United States. The institute was founded by Sheikh Hamza Yusuf. It is an educational institute based in Hayward, California.

After graduating from the University of Qatar with a Bachelor in Education and a Bachelor in English Literature' (with distinction), Sheikha Aisha went on to get a Master in Business Administration' from the University of Hull in the United Kingdom, then received a PhD from Cass Business School in the United Kingdom in the area of 'Corporate Governance'.

In 2013 Sheikha Aisha bint Faleh bin Nasser Al-Thani was awarded an Honorary Doctorate of Business from Plymouth University.
