= Mesaieed =

Mesaieed مسيعيد
- City
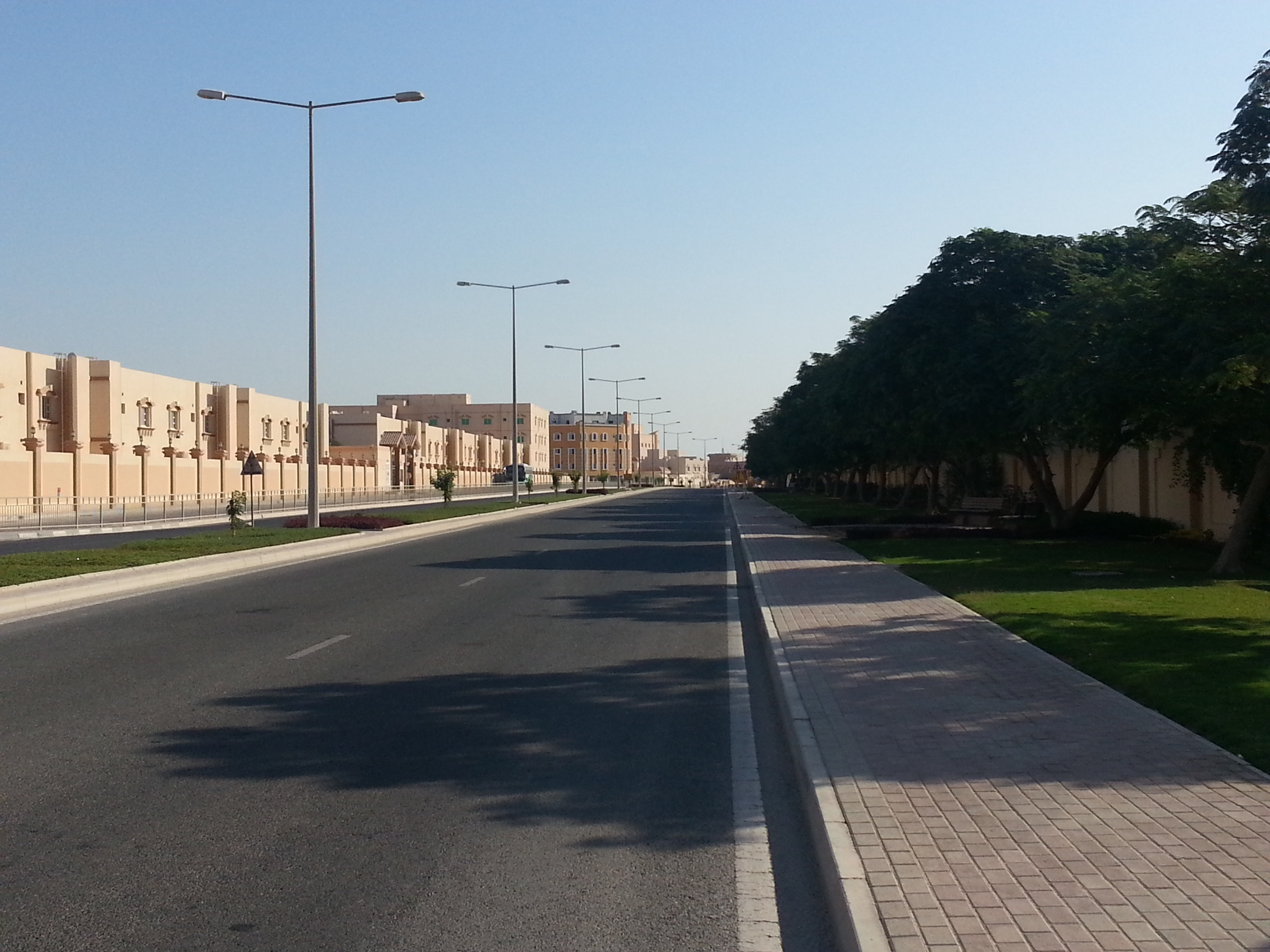
- View from the road of a gated community in Mesaieed near Dunes Mall

- Map of Qatar with Mesaieed highlighted

- Location within Qatar
- Coordinates (Umm Sa'id): 24.98°N 51.55°E
- Country: Qatar
- Municipality: Al Wakrah Municipality
- Zone: Zone 92
- District no.: 650
- Established: 1949

Area
  - Total: 86.8 km^{2} (33.5 sq mi)
- Time zone: UTC+03 (East Africa Time)
- ISO 3166 code: QA

Mesaieed (Arabic: مسيعيد, romanized: Musaī'īd, also transliterated as Umm Sa'id) is an industrial city in Al Wakrah Municipality, 36 kilometres (22 mi) south of the Qatari capital Doha. It was one of the most important cities in Qatar during the 20th century, having gained recognition as a prime industrial zone and tanking center for petroleum received from Dukhan.

Both Mesaieed and its industrial area are administered by a subdivision of QatarEnergy called "Mesaieed Industry City Management", which was established in 1996.

== Etymology ==
According to The Centre for Geographic Information Systems of Qatar, the city derives its name from a plant known locally as sead which previously grew in bountiful quantities in the area.

== History ==
Mesaieed was established in 1949 as a tanker terminal by QatarEnergy on a previously uninhabited site along the coast. It was chosen by the company because of its proximity to the working population in Doha and Al Wakrah and because of the depth of its waters. It was the only deepwater port in Qatar for more than 20 years.

During fieldwork conducted by anthropologist Henry Field in 1950, Field recorded that Sheikh Mansur bin Khalil, a local sheikh, identified the Al Hibab as the primary tribal group residing in the area at the time, estimating their presence at approximately 100 tents.

In May 1960, the workers of Qatar Petroleum in Mesaieed went on strike following the redundancy of six Qatari employees and the firing of one resulting from a fight with an Indian employee. Sheikh Khalifa bin Hamad Al Thani, in his correspondence with the British, stated he believed the redundancies to be justified and thus did not support the workers' right to strike. Despite one or two incidents involving confrontations between strikers and senior staff of Qatar Petroleum, the strike largely remained peaceful. Fearful that the strike would spread to Qatar's other industrial city of Dukhan, Sheikh Khalifa sent a force of 40 policemen to Mesaieed that month.

The development of Mesaieed faced some limitations in its early years: the encroaching industrial area to the south, sand dunes and an energy corridor to the west, and a sabkha (a type of salt flat) to the east. This configuration directed expansion primarily towards the north, with major roads on the north and west facilitating connections to the Saudi border, Al Wakrah and Doha.

The initial structure plan for Mesaieed envisioned five distinct neighborhoods, each with its own center, delineated by primary and secondary roads. These neighborhoods were designed to feature unique identities and local centers to meet daily needs, promoting both automobile and pedestrian movement. The local centers were intended to offer various facilities, including commercial spaces, local mosques, parking, and recreational opportunities, while the town center provided similar but larger-scale amenities.

A pedestrian network was planned for the town, linking the local centers and incorporating recreational facilities. Residential areas were planned with varying densities: high density near the town center, medium density to the east, and low density to the west. By the mid-1970s, it became clear that there was a pressing need for more residential accommodation to support the rapidly growing Mesaieed Industrial Area. In response, the government initiated several projects to provide the necessary housing and associated facilities. Housing for senior staff mainly consisted of villas, while intermediate staff housing for expatriates was designed by Greek-French architect Georges Candilis and followed a similar design to that used near the newly-created West Bay district of Doha, which was also designed by Candilis. This housing included over 200 units.

By 1976, Mesaieed had approximately 700 residential units, mainly in dormitory-style buildings with some villas. Projections for 1983 estimated a resident population of about 6,400. At that time, Mesaieed was equipped with essential services and amenities, including a health center, police and fire stations, a post office, two banks, a bakery, a cold store, two primary schools, an international school, staff clubs, mosques, a cinema, and a golf course.

== Administration ==
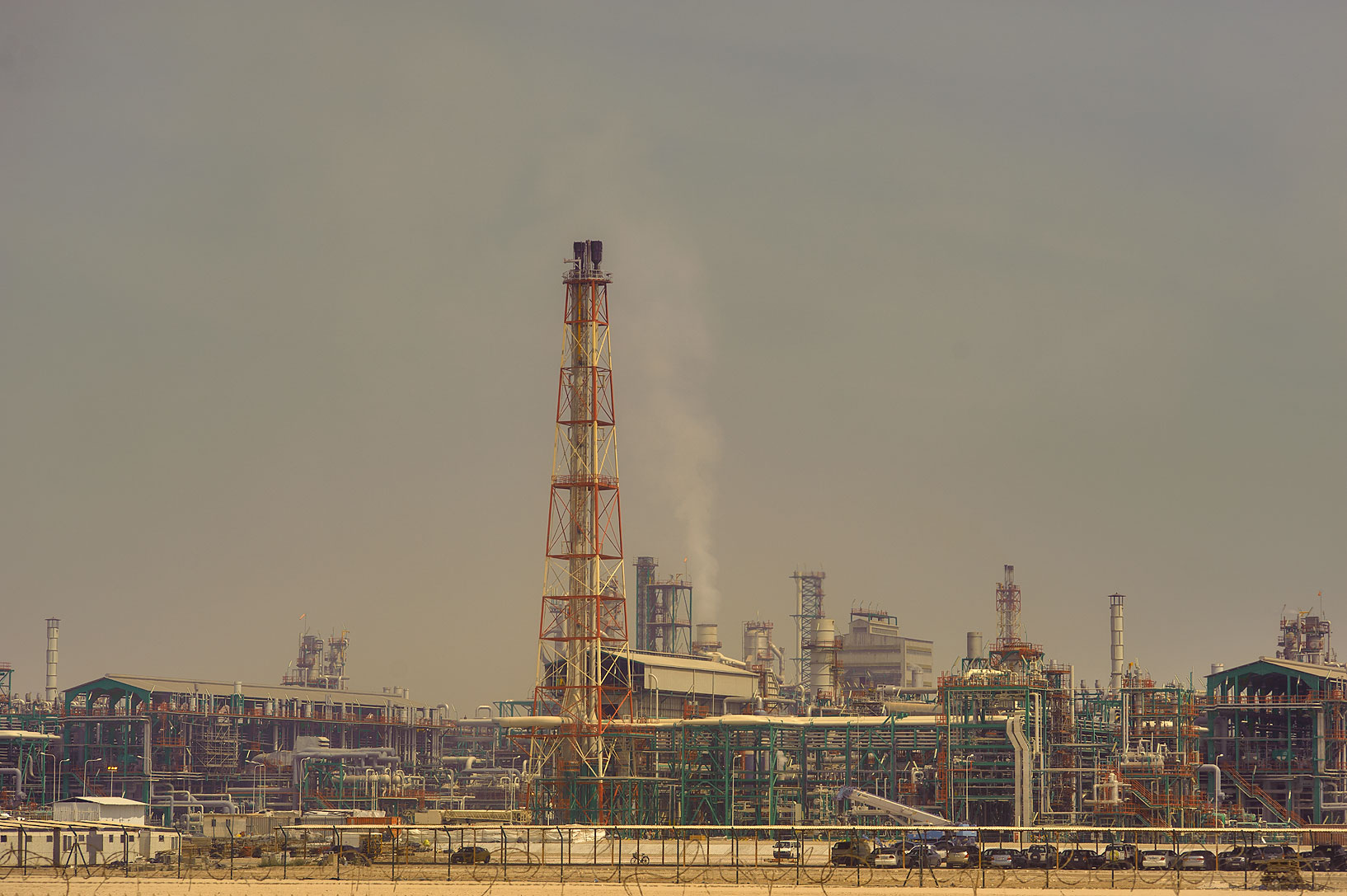
Oil factories in Mesaieed Industrial Area

At the time of its inception Mesaieed was administered wholly by QatarEnergy. After QatarEnergy transferred its headquarters from Dukhan to Mesaieed in 1956, they undertook substantial development on workers' camps and facilities. The government had agreed to the company's request to allow it full jurisdiction over the area, and additionally, until the 1960s, the government had prioritized the development of Doha rather than its oil and natural gas industry. The rapid growth of oil and natural gas revenues in the 1960s and the accession of Khalifa bin Hamad Al Thani in 1972 resulted in the government assuming a portion of control over the area.

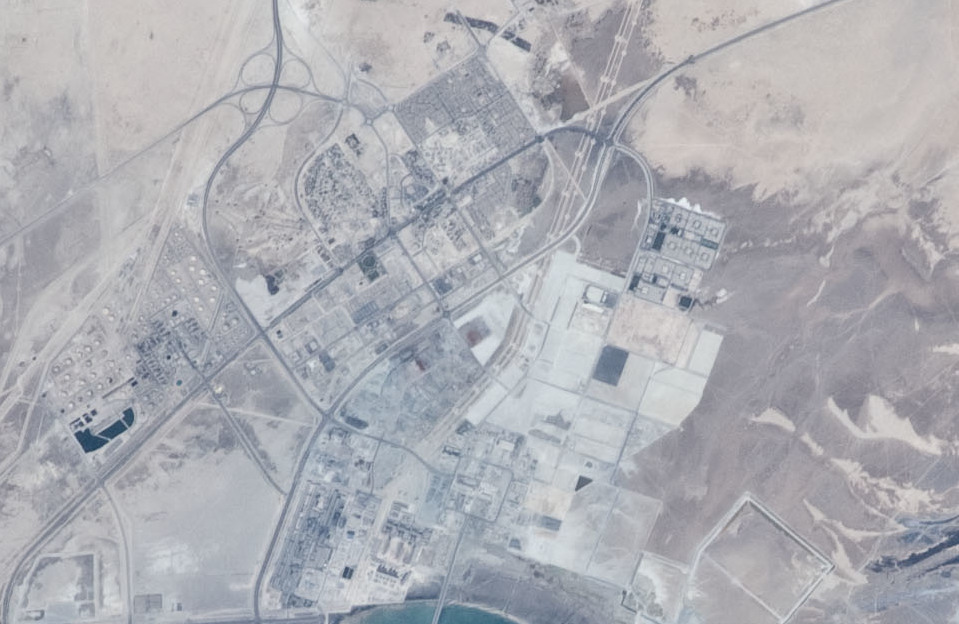
Satellite view of Mesaieed in 2010

In 1997, Mesaieed Municipality was formed from the areas of Mesaieed Industrial Area, Mesaieed and Shagra. It was dissolved in 2006 and reincorporated into the municipality of Al Wakrah.

When free elections of the Central Municipal Council first took place in Qatar during 1999, Mesaieed was designated the constituency seat of constituency no. 11. It would remain constituency seat in the next three consecutive elections until the fifth municipal elections in 2015 when it was merged into constituency no. 20. In the inaugural municipal elections in 1999, Mohammed Hamad Al Shawi Al Marri won the elections, receiving 48.8%, or 60, of the votes. The runner-up that year was Saud Al Awad Al Dosari, who had 41.5%, or 51, of the votes. Mansour Salem Al-Hajri was elected in the 2002 elections. For the third municipal elections in 2007, Saeed Ali Al-Marri was elected constituency representative. Al-Marri successfully retained his seat in the 2011 elections.

== Geography ==
Mesaieed is located on the southeast coast, approximately 36 kilometres (22 mi) south of Qatar's capital, Doha. It is a part of the Al Wakrah Municipality.

Mesaieed forms the eastern boundary of the southern desert region, which occupies 34.7% of Qatar's total area. Of the four sub-regions of the southern desert, Mesaieed is a part of the trapezoidal-shaped hamada sub-group, which has its western boundary at Abu Nakhla, the water pipeline running between the two demarcating the base of this zone. The surface is covered by a mosaic of closely packed pebbles and rock fragments or, in some places, by a thin layer of indurated mineral deposits forming a hard crust.

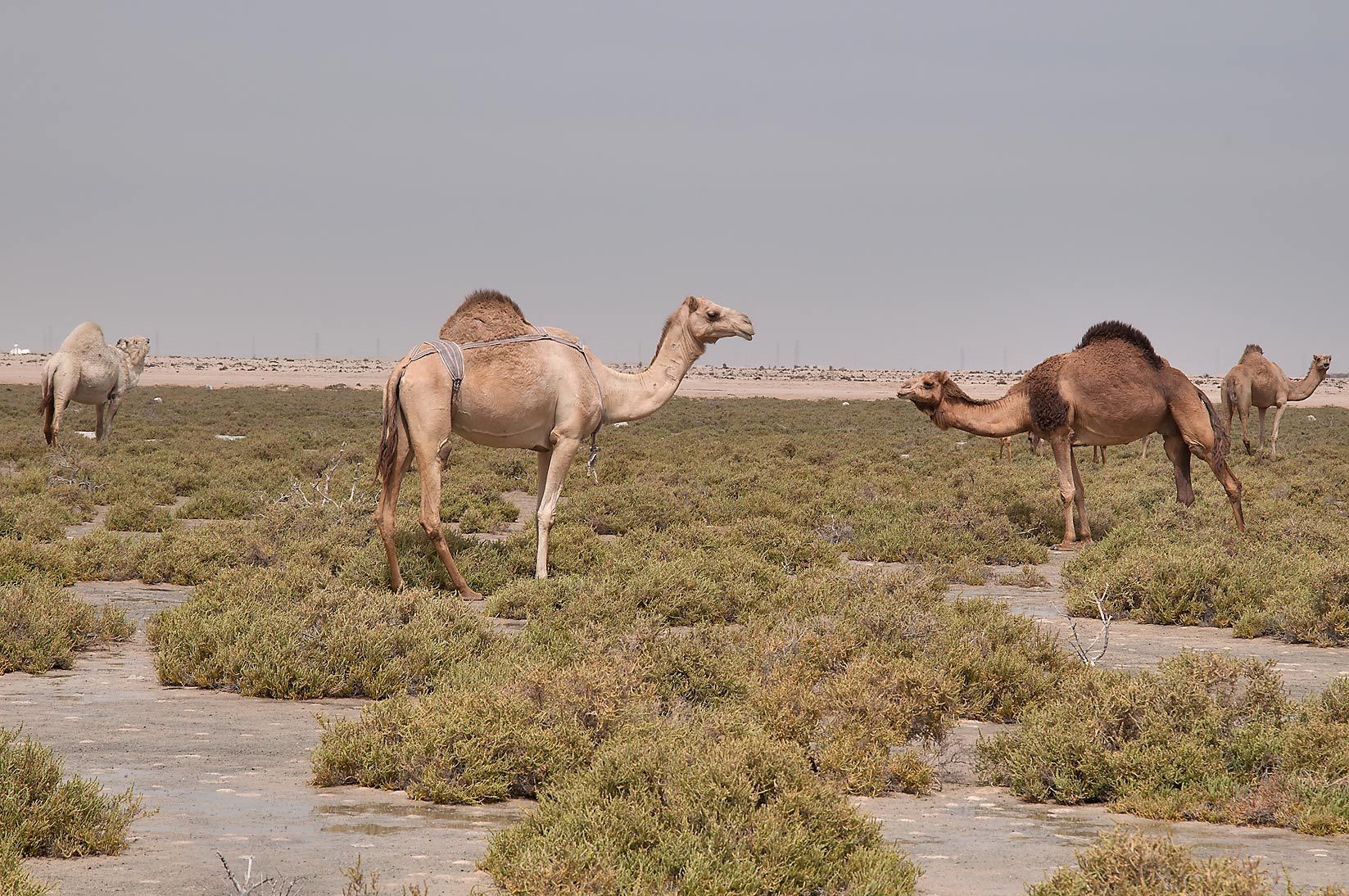
Camels grazing a salt marsh near Mesaieed, Qatar

The eastern section is situated over a low, rocky promontory which is enclosed by sabkhas on the coast. The sabkha region is 40 kilometres (25 mi) long and between 7 kilometres (4.3 mi) and 10 kilometres (6.2 mi) wide. The southern portion of Mesaieed is characterized by sand dunes. These dunes are in a state of constant migration, propelled by the dominant north-northwestern wind known locally as shamal. To the northeast of the coast, where the residential section is located, there are sandy hillocks which lie 9 m above sea level. Roughly 262 hectares of mangroves are found around Mesaieed's coastline.

The residual soils are overlain with aeolian deposits. It lies on limestone bedrock, which is found at depths 0.25 m to 8 m above sea level. The industrial area's strategic location and the high water table help ensure that Mesaieed's groundwater remains unpolluted.

In a 2010 survey of Mesaieed's coastal waters conducted by the Qatar Statistics Authority, it was found that its maximum depth was 11 meters (36 ft) and minimum depth was 4 meters (13 ft). The waters had an average pH of 7.87, a salinity of 52.47 psu, an average temperature of 22.91°C and 5.47 mg/L of dissolved oxygen.

=== Wildlife ===
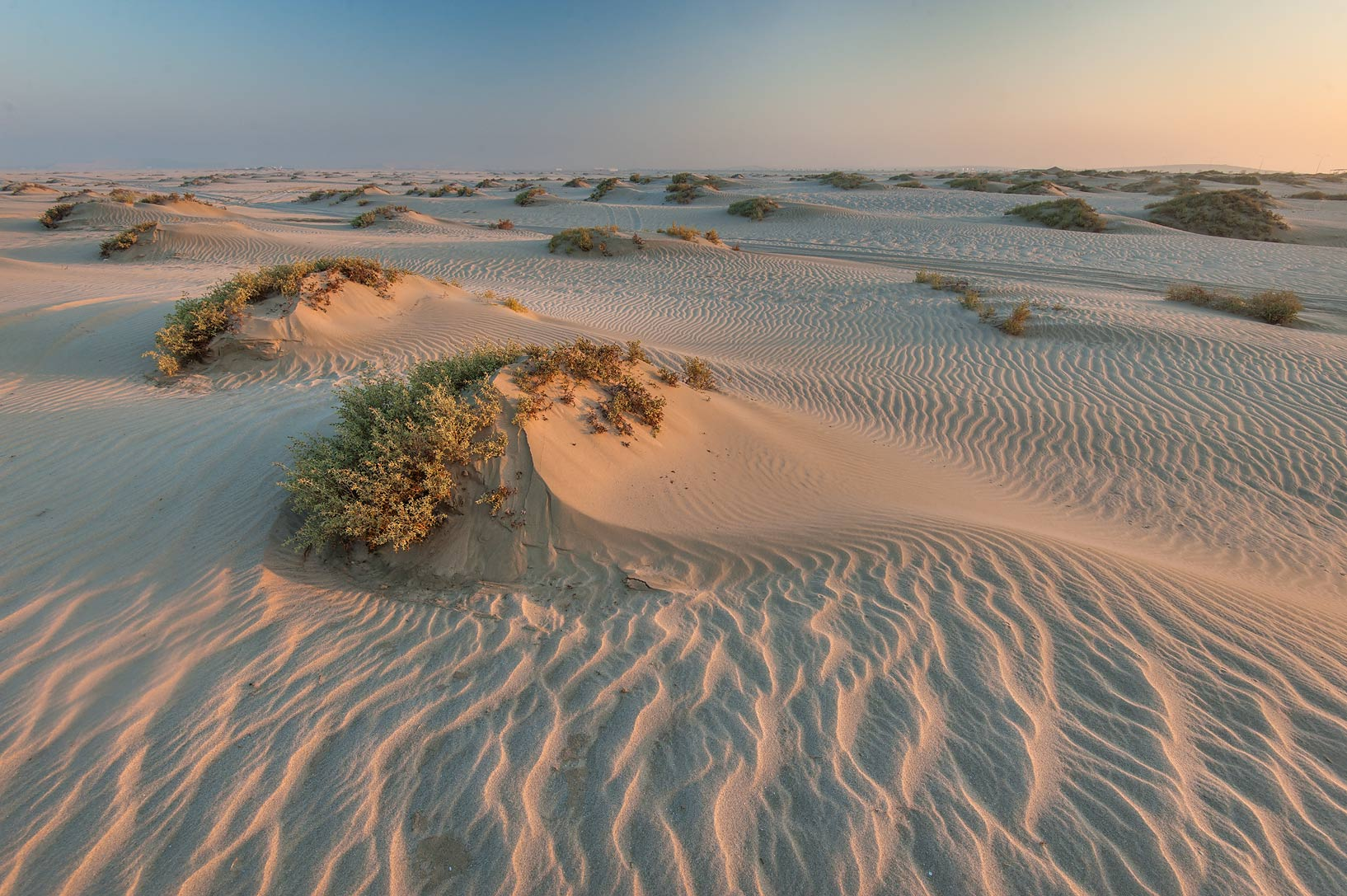
Soda rosmarinus growing on small sand dunes in Mesaieed

A new psylla species known as the Mesaieed psylla was discovered in sand dunes near the city. It is a small insect measuring about 2 millimetres (0.079 in), presenting as either green or black, and subsists off of plants.

Common vegetation found in Mesaieed include reeds (Phragmites australis) in wet areas, desert thumbs (Cynomorium coccineum) near the coast, the damas tree (Conocarpus lancifolius) near the industrial area, nafayj (Pulicaria gnaphalodes) in depressions and wadis, shanan (Soda rosmarinus) on sand dunes and sabkhas, and thalj (Cornulaca monacantha).

=== Climate ===
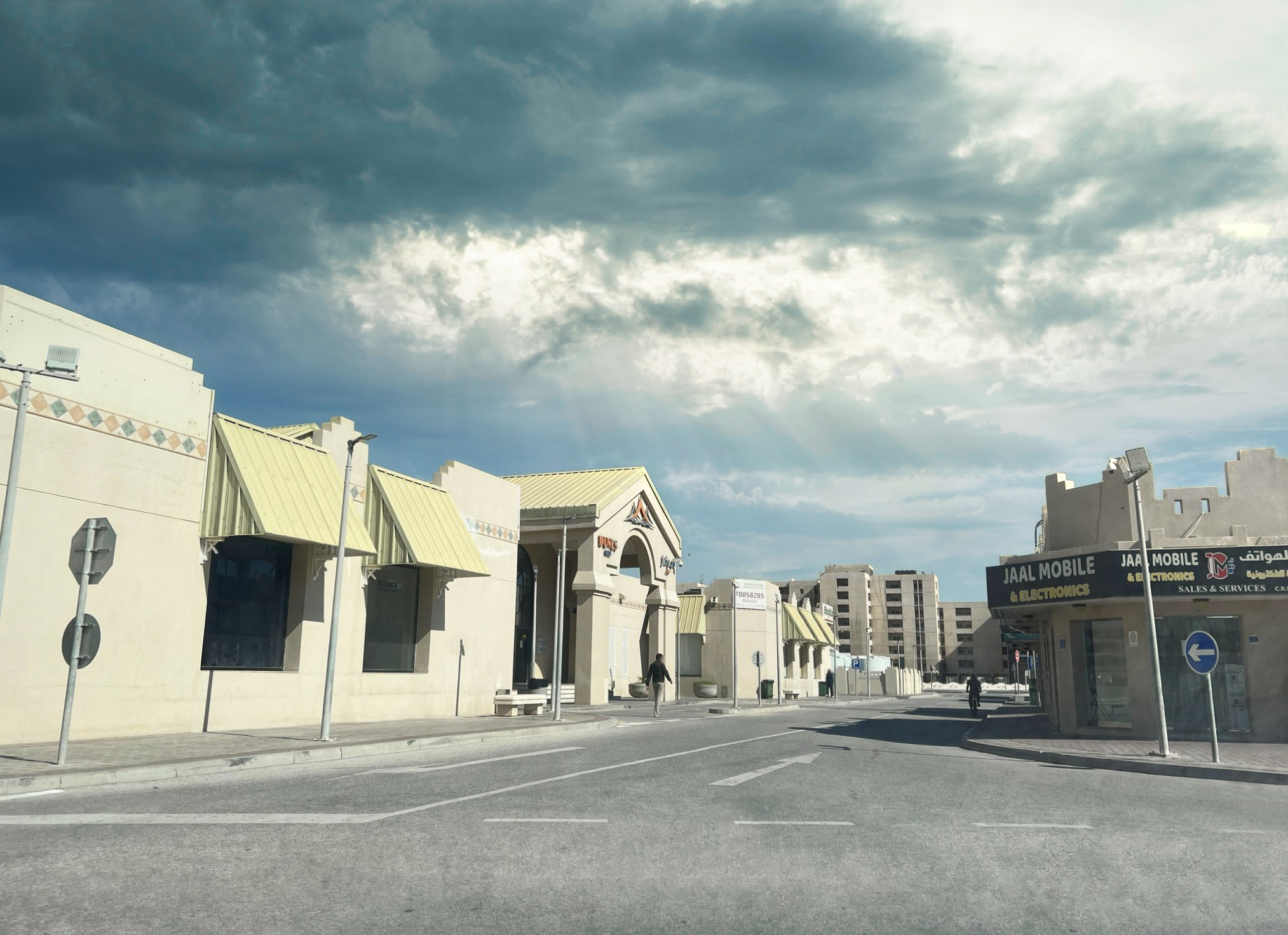
Dunes Mall storefront

According to the Qatar Meteorology Department, until February 2017, Mesaieed held the record for the lowest recorded temperature in Qatar, measuring in at 3.8 °C (38.8 °F) in January 1964. This record was broken when 1.5 °C (34.7 °F) was documented in Abu Samra in February 2017.

The following is climate data for Mesaieed obtained from the Qatar Statistics Authority.

Climate data for Mesaieed
| Month | Jan | Feb | Mar | Apr | May | Jun | Jul | Aug | Sep | Oct | Nov | Dec | Year |
|---|---|---|---|---|---|---|---|---|---|---|---|---|---|
| Mean daily maximum °C (°F) | 20 (68) | 22 (72) | 25 (77) | 30 (86) | 36 (97) | 38 (100) | 38 (100) | 37 (99) | 34 (93) | 32 (90) | 27 (81) | 20 (68) | 30 (86) |
| Mean daily minimum °C (°F) | 11 (52) | 12 (54) | 15 (59) | 18 (64) | 23 (73) | 25 (77) | 26 (79) | 27 (81) | 24 (75) | 21 (70) | 17 (63) | 11 (52) | 19 (67) |
| Average precipitation mm (inches) | 10 (0.4) | 2 (0.1) | 2.5 (0.10) | 6 (0.2) | 1 (0.0) | 0 (0) | 0 (0) | 0 (0) | 0 (0) | 0.5 (0.02) | 13.5 (0.53) | 24 (0.9) | 59.5 (2.25) |
| Average relative humidity (%) | 69 | 66 | 55 | 51 | 43 | 41 | 48 | 62 | 60 | 64 | 65 | 70 | 58 |
Source: Qatar Statistics Authority

== Industrial area ==
Mesaieed is an industrial city managed by Mesaieed Industrial City, a subsidiary of QatarEnergy. All the industry concentrated in the city constitutes the core of Qatar's industry.

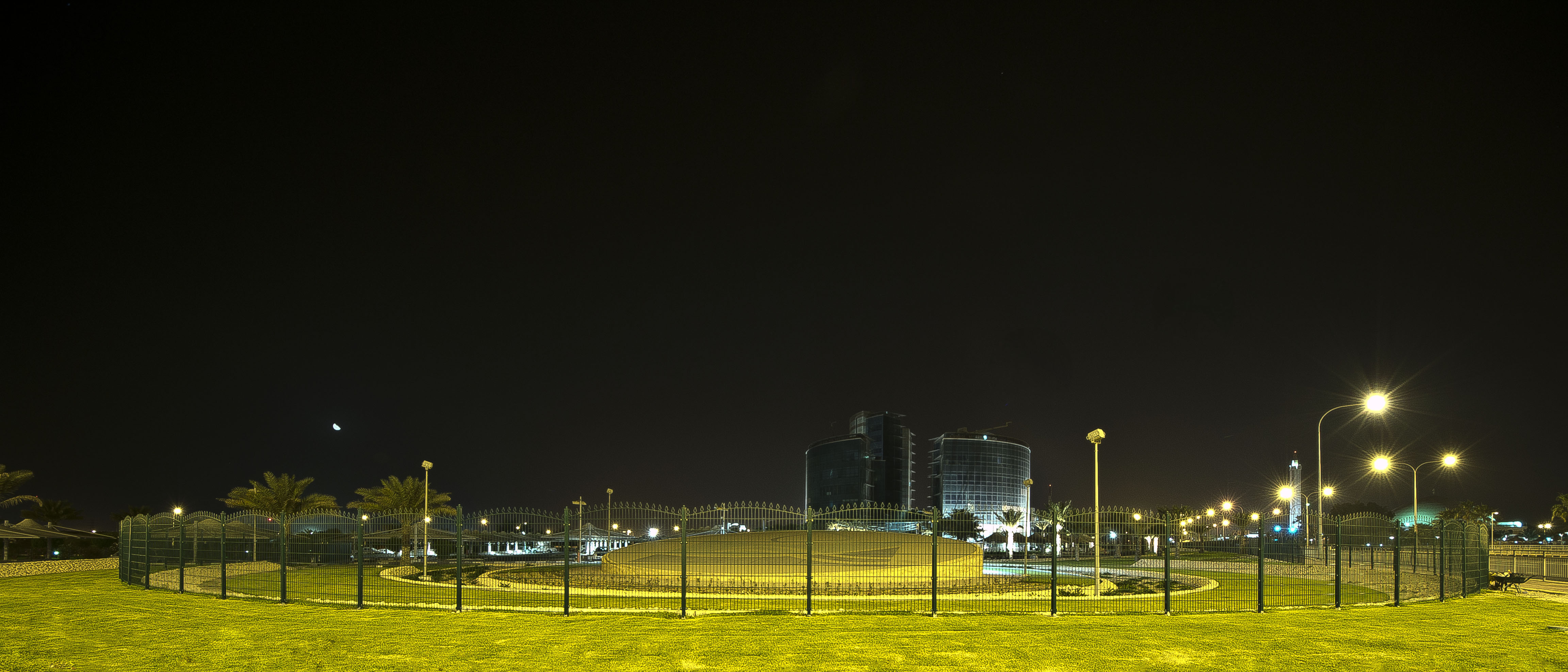
QatarEnergy's headquarters in Mesaieed

The industrial area accommodates the main plants of the following companies:

- QatarEnergy
- QP Refinery
- Qatar Lubricants Co.
- Qatar Fertiliser Co. (QAFCO)
- Qatar Fuel Additives Co. (QAFAC)
- Qatar Petrochemical Co. (QAPCO)
- Qatar Steel Co. (Qatar Steel)
- Qatar Vinyl Co. (QVC)
- Qatar Chemicals Co. (Q-Chem)
- Qatar Aluminium (Qatalum)
- Mesaieed port authority
- Container terminal CT7
- Qatar Primary Materials Company QPMC
- Qcon Marine Fabrication Yard QMFY

== Developments ==
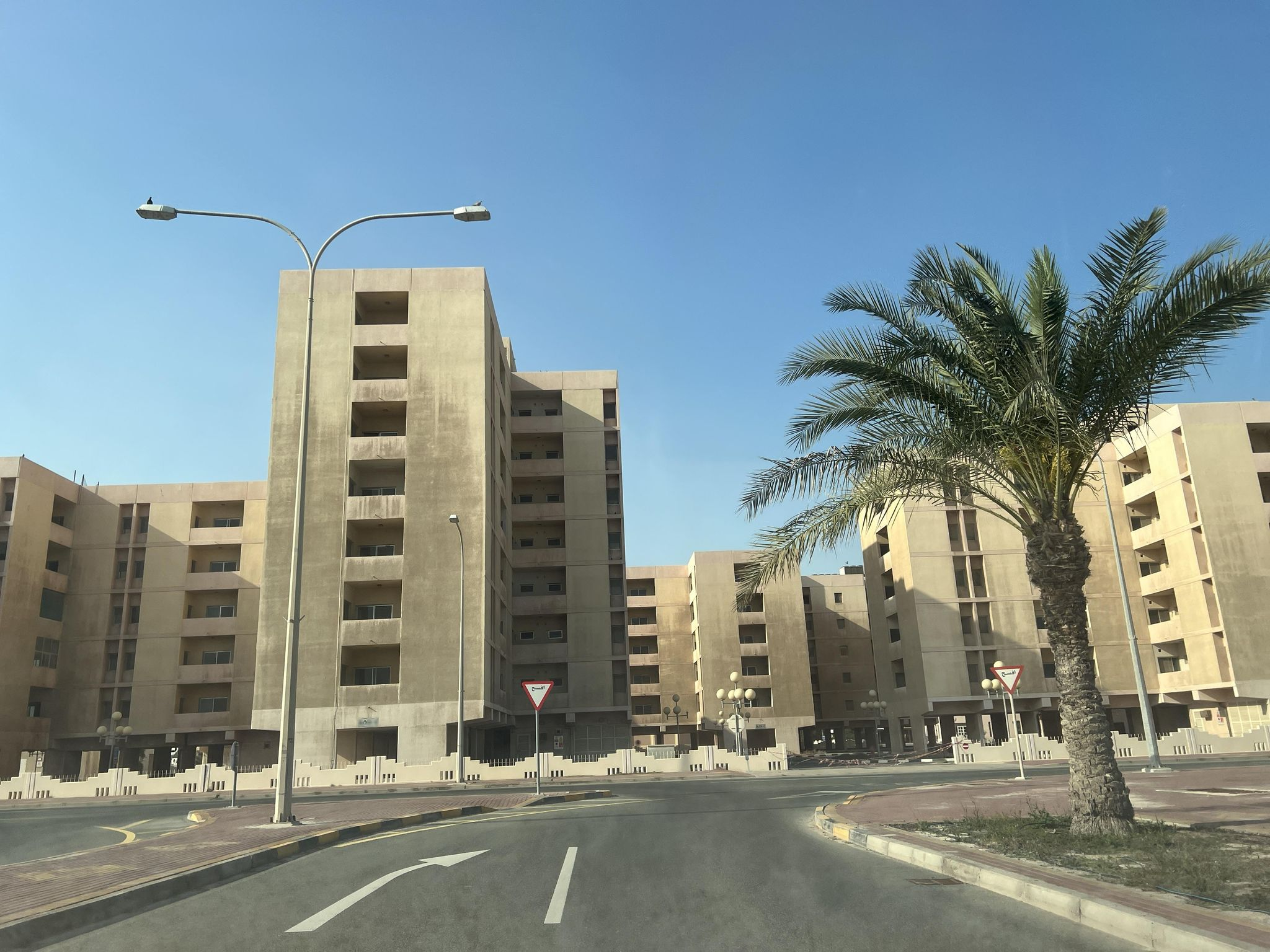
Under-construction apartments in Mesaieed

As part of the Qatari government's National Vision 2030, a $7.4 bn project was launched in 2010 to construct a major port strategically located near Mesaieed Industrial Area's port. The port, named Hamad Port, became operational in December 2016 and covers an area of 26 square kilometres (10 sq mi).

== Tourism ==
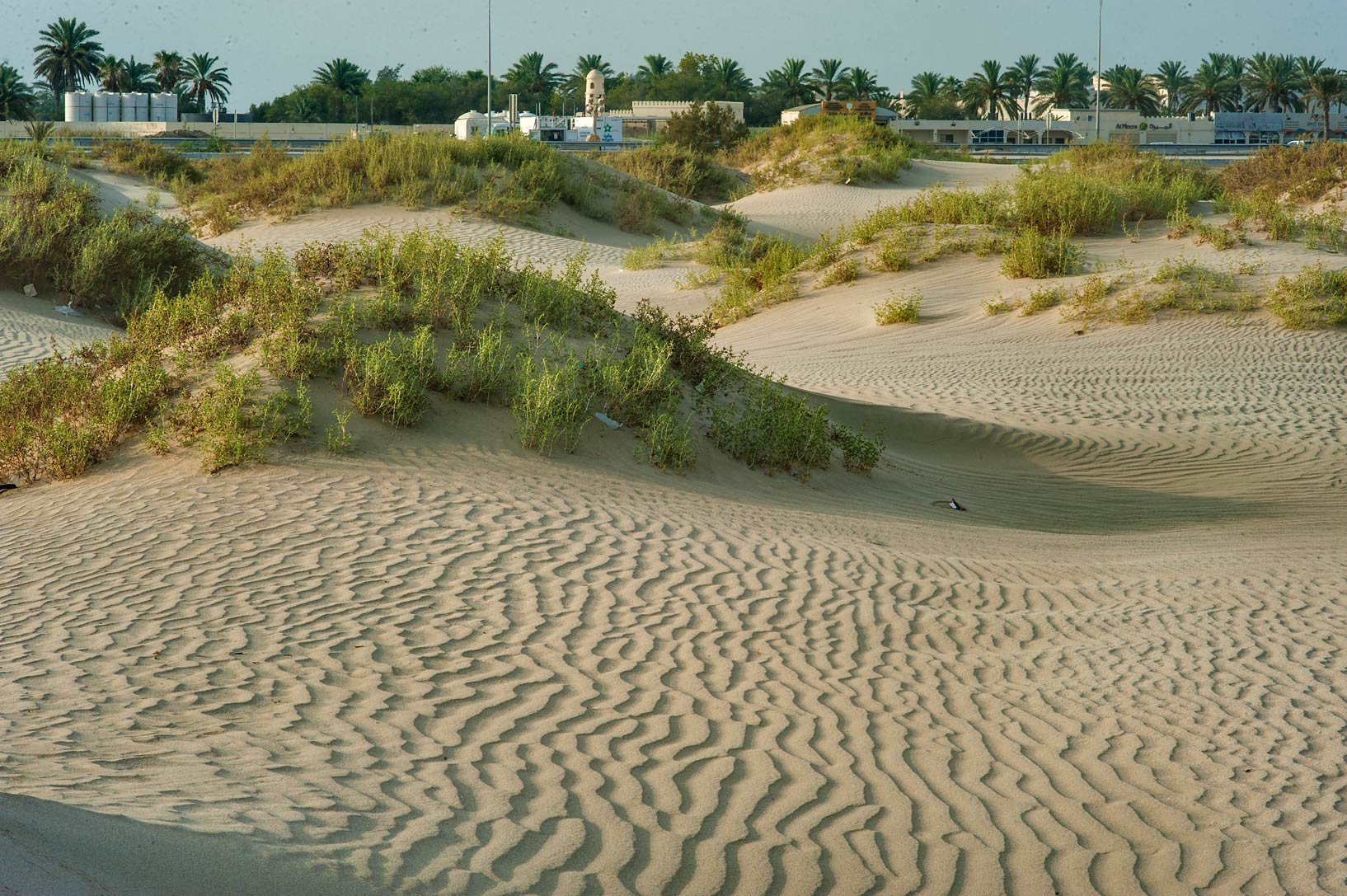
Sand mounds near Mesaieed, with Sealine Beach Resort in background

Tourism is confined to Mesaieed's desert areas, primarily to the immediate southeast of the city. Beach resorts on Mesaieed's coast are considered to be among Qatar's most important tourist areas. The main tourist resort is Sealine Beach Resort, which has a hotel, villas and water sports facilities.

The sand dunes on the eastern coast are known as 'singing sands' because of the sounds they produce.

In 2012, Barwa Group launched a construction project in the southern zone of Mesaieed to establish a large tourist resort over an area of 829 square metres (8,920 sq ft).

Al Afjah Heritage Village is a cultural attraction located on the western boundaries of Mesaieed.

== Telecommunications ==
The Mesaieed central switchboard was completed in 1978 with a capacity of 3,000 lines. According to government statistics, the total number of telephones installed in 1980 was 405. Qatar National Telephone Services carried out substantial development on the telephone system the next year, resulting in a nearly two-fold increase to 808 telephones.

== Transport ==
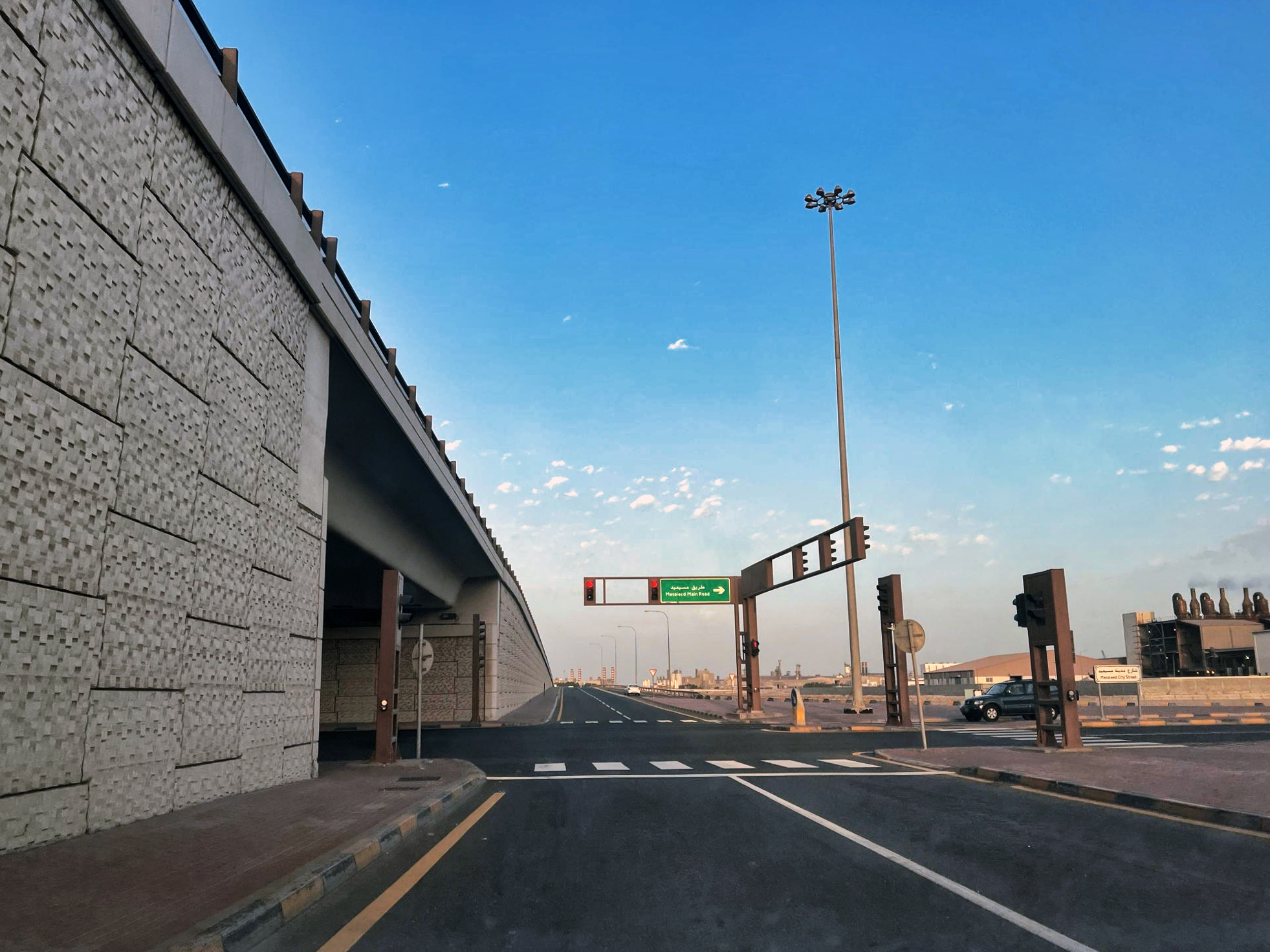
Gate 1 Interchange in Mesaieed

The first roads in Mesaieed were constructed in the late 1940s by Qatar Petroleum (today Qatar Energy). They were paved in 1955. The roads fell into disrepair in the 1960s, and in 1968 the government assumed responsibility for developing the road system from Mesaieed to Al Wakrah.

In October 1970, a major government construction project was launched to connect Mesaieed to Doha with a modern highway. Costing 14 million Qatari riyals, the construction of Mesaieed Road was awarded to the Japanese firm Taisei. The completed road, approximately 45 kilometres (28 mi) in length, was designed to accommodate heavy industrial traffic from the industrial area and significantly reduce travel times between Doha and Mesaieed.

In 1977, a road system scheme was designed by William L. Perreira & Associates and work was commenced by the Public Works Authority. The construction was completed that year, with the road system extending to both the city proper and the industrial area.

There is a public bus service from Mesaieed to Al Ghanim Bus Station in Doha every 30 minutes.

== Infrastructure ==
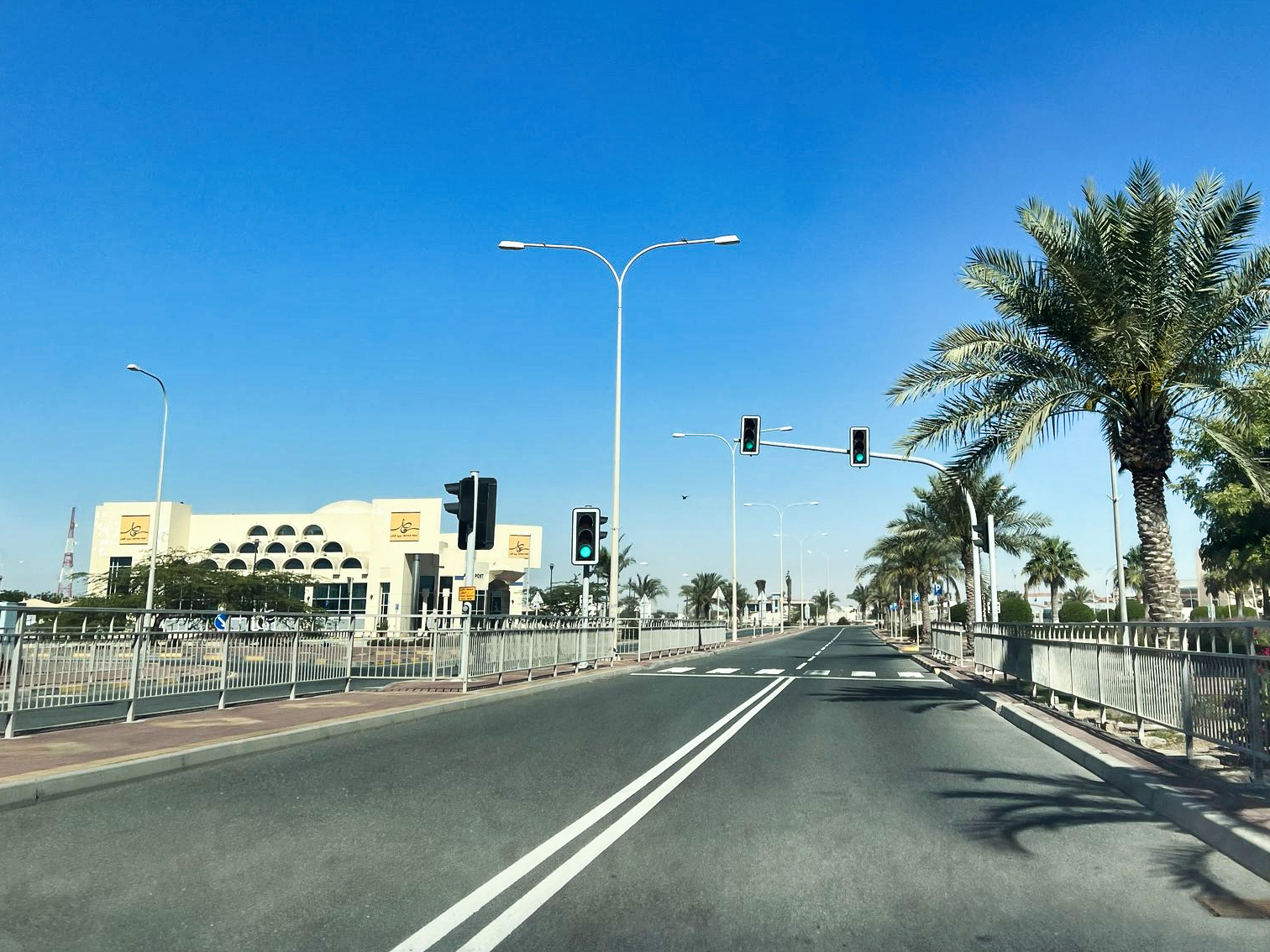
Qatar Post office building in Mesaieed

In the 1950s, shortly after it was established as an industrial city, Qatar Petroleum operated a hospital with 75 beds. There was also an active airfield in the area. Mesaieed opened its first government health clinic in late 1975.

The Mesaieed Master Plan was devised in 2006 and its contents guide the city's development over 25 years from 2006 until 2030. It outlines the distribution of land for public and private infrastructure, such as power, petrochemical industries, non-petrochemical industries, residential units, green belts, shipping, and waste disposal.

There are five banks active in Mesaieed: Qatar Islamic Bank (QIB), Doha Bank, Qatar National Bank (QNB), Commercial Bank Qatar (CBQ), and The Hongkong and Shanghai Banking Corp (HSBC). HSBC is located inside a state-of-the-art post office (the second largest in Qatar). The QNB branch, established in 1974, was one of the bank's first branches inaugurated outside the confines of Doha.

Adjacent to the shopping centre is a large souq or market known as Souq Mesaieed. The souq comprises both residential units and commercial spaces and occupies an area of 45,576 m^{2}. As of 2021, there are over 100 businesses located in the souq, ranging from salons and laundry services to restaurants and cafes. Also included within the souq are 70 units of commercial offices.

== Sports ==
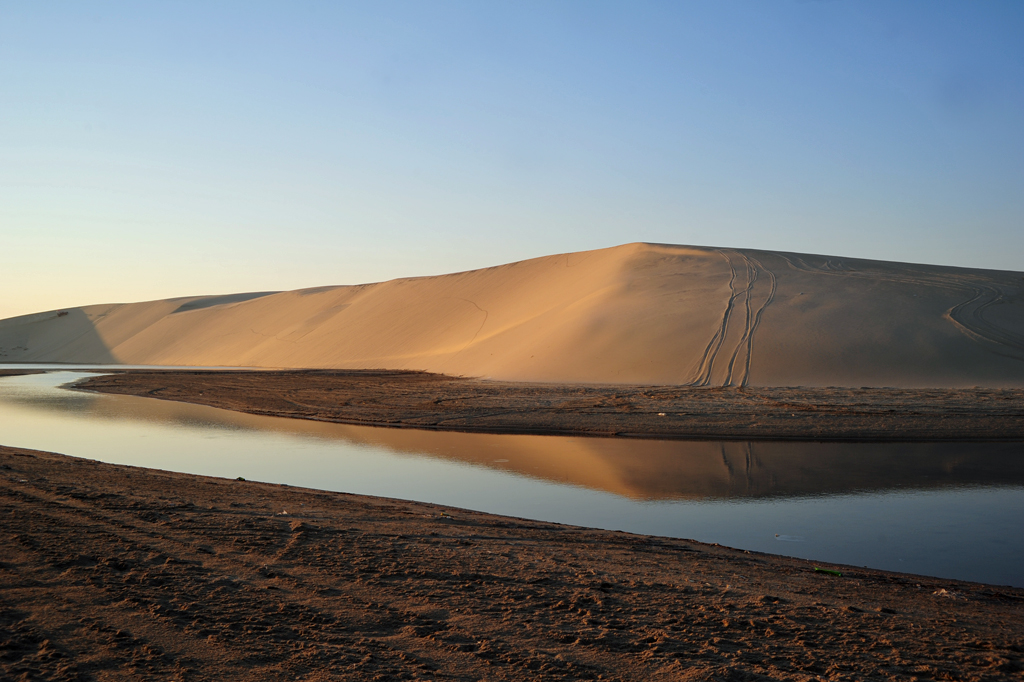
Mesaieed desert

Mesaieed Endurance Track, located in the desert, played host to the endurance riding competition in the 2006 Asian Games. Temporary seating for 500 spectators was erected in the desert for the tournament. The track comprises five loops ranging between 20 and 30 km, adding up to an overall race distance of 120 km. The track was also host to the 2013 CHI Al Shaqab endurance races.

There is a sports complex in Mesaieed which hosts national sports tournaments organized by QatarEnergy.

=== Mesaieed Hockey Club ===
The MHC was established in Oct 2011 by players from various companies. Since then, the club has taken part in various tournaments organized by the Qatar Hockey Federation (QHF). The club joined the Qatar Hockey League in the 2013 season.

=== Al Banush Club ===
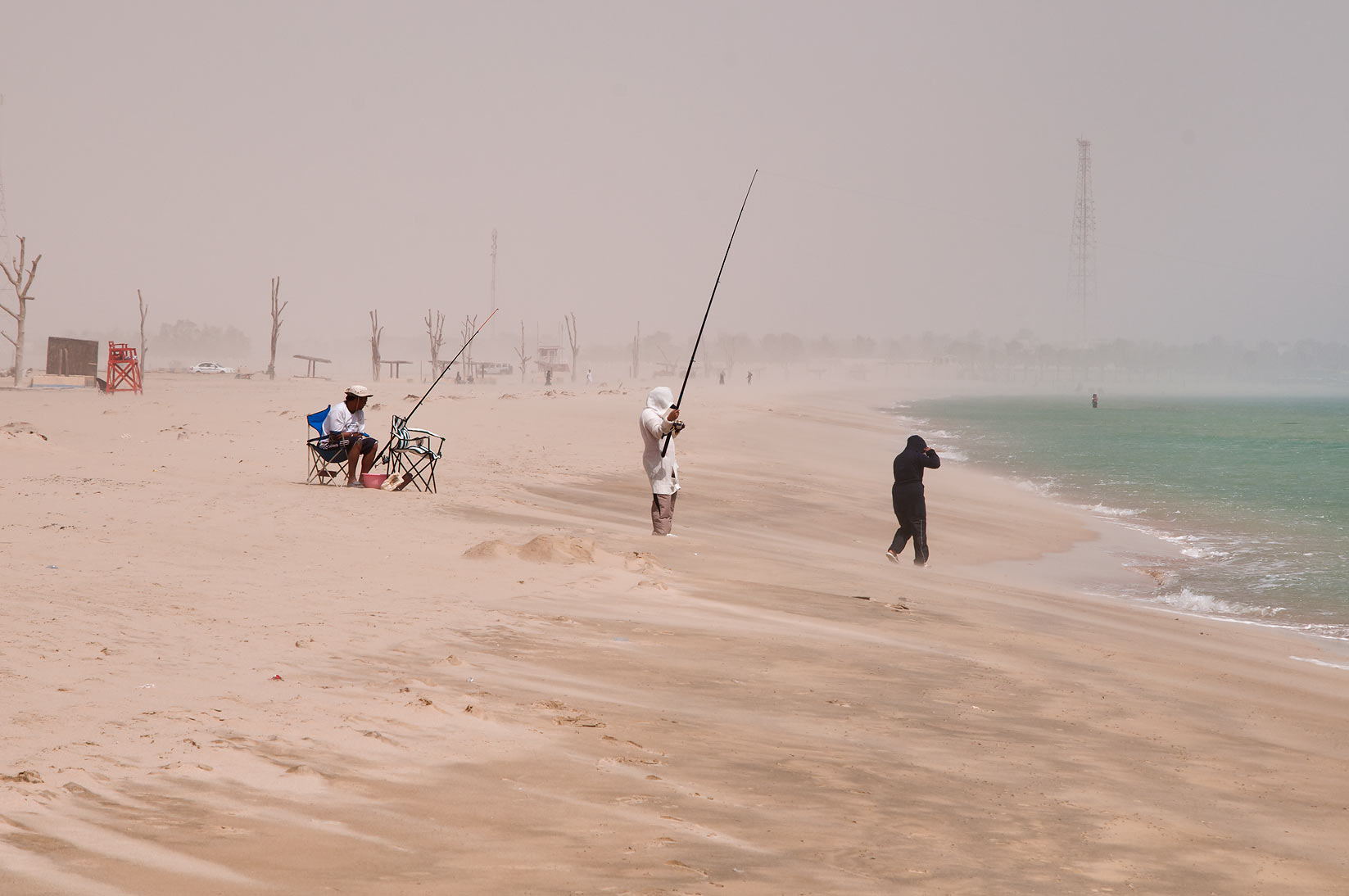
Fishing on Mesaieed beach in Qatar during a sandstorm

Owned by QAFCO, Al Banush Club is used primarily by high-ranking staff members of QAFCO. It is the most sizable club in Mesaieed and hosts many recreational facilities such as a main hall, a football ground, tennis and basketball courts, a swimming pool and restaurants. The annual QAFCO flower and vegetable show is held on its football ground. A cricket field is located near the club.

=== QAPCO Club ===
It is owned by QAPCO. Inaugurated in 2013, it is one of the largest clubs in the city. Its facilities include a football field, basketball, tennis, badminton and table tennis facilities, a swimming pool and a bowling arena.

=== QP Golf Club ===
QP Golf Club is owned by QatarEnergy and was founded in 1951. It accommodates one of the only two golf courses in Qatar, and a swimming pool. The golf course is the oldest in Qatar, dating back to at least 1955. It underwent an expansion in 1959.

== Education ==
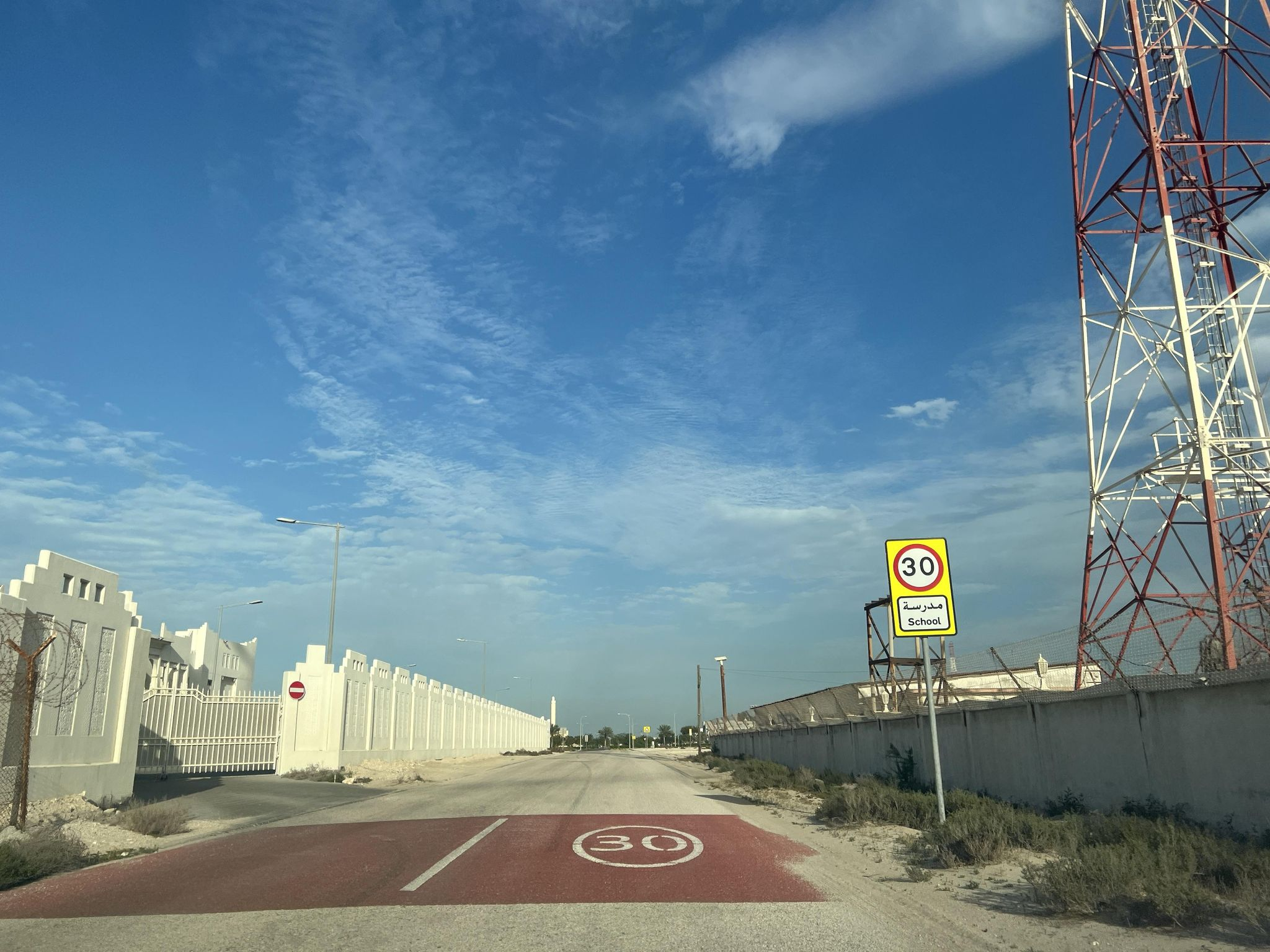
Mesaieed Independent School for Girls on Abe Inthaila Street

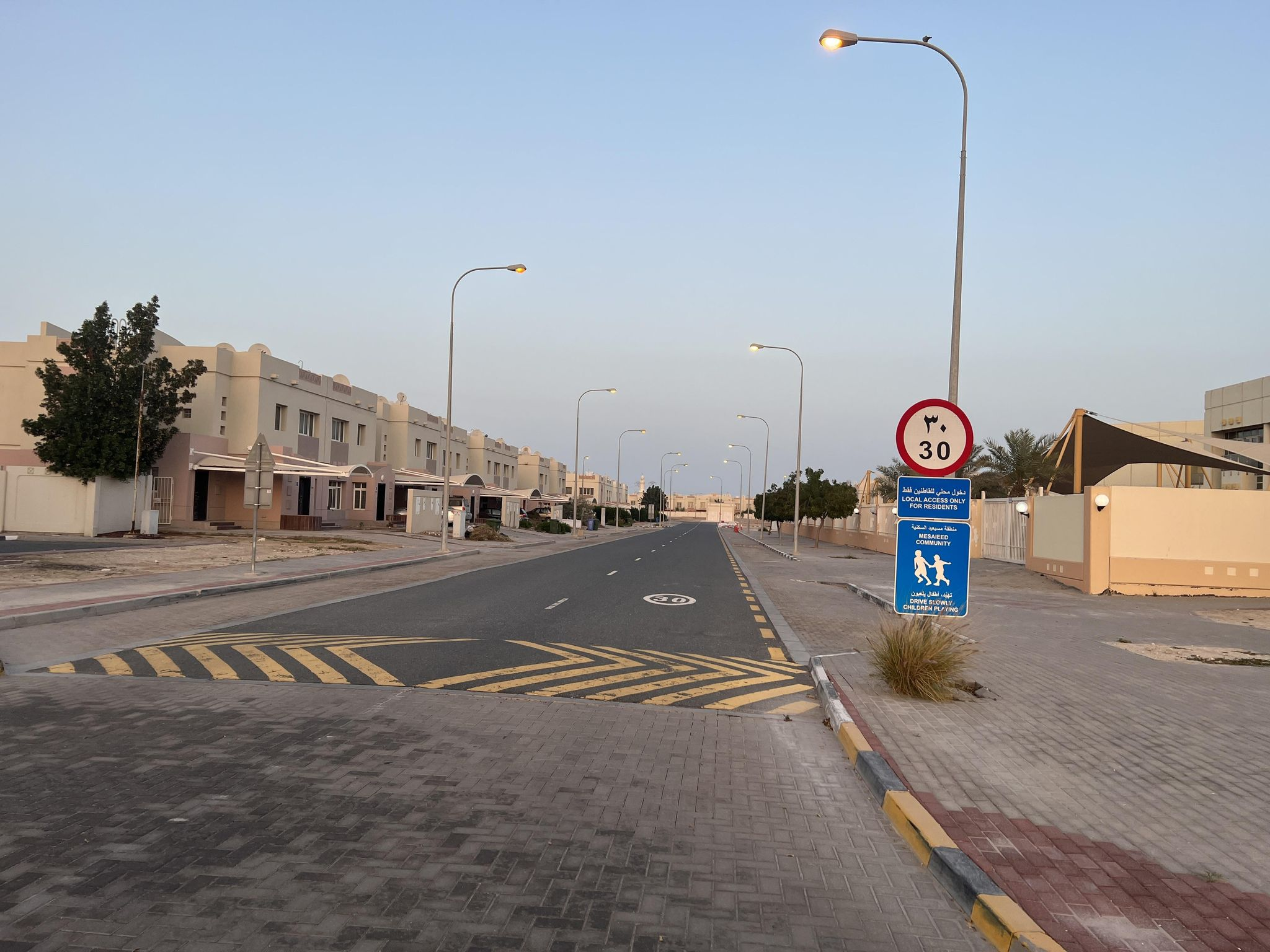
Neighborhood of Mesaieed International School's secondary branch

The following schools are located in Mesaieed:

| Name of School | Curriculum | Grade | Genders | Official Website | Ref |
|---|---|---|---|---|---|
| Qafco Norwegian School | Norwegian | Primary – Secondary | Both | N/A | |
| Qafco Primary School | International | Kindergarten – Primary | Both | N/A | |
| Mesaieed Independent School for Boys | Independent | Primary | Boys-only | N/A | |
| Mesaieed Independent School for Girls | Independent | Primary – Secondary | Girls-only | N/A | |
| Mesaieed International School, Foundation | International | Kindergarten | Both | Official website | |
| Mesaieed International School, Preparatory | International | Secondary | Both | Official website | |
| Mesaieed International School, Primary | International | Primary | Both | Official website | |
| Mesaieed Nursery School | International | Kindergarten | Both | N/A | |

== Demographics ==
The first time an official government census was conducted was in 1986. According to population estimates, the population in 1953 was no more than 500. This increased to over 2,500 in 1960, after QatarEnergy had shifted their headquarters from Dukhan to Mesaieed. Thereafter, the company took initiatives to decrease the population of the city and industrial area, resulting in a population of around 2,000 in 1976. In 1982, the population increased to approximately 5,800 people, of whom 4,900 were employed in industrial services.

=== Registered live births ===
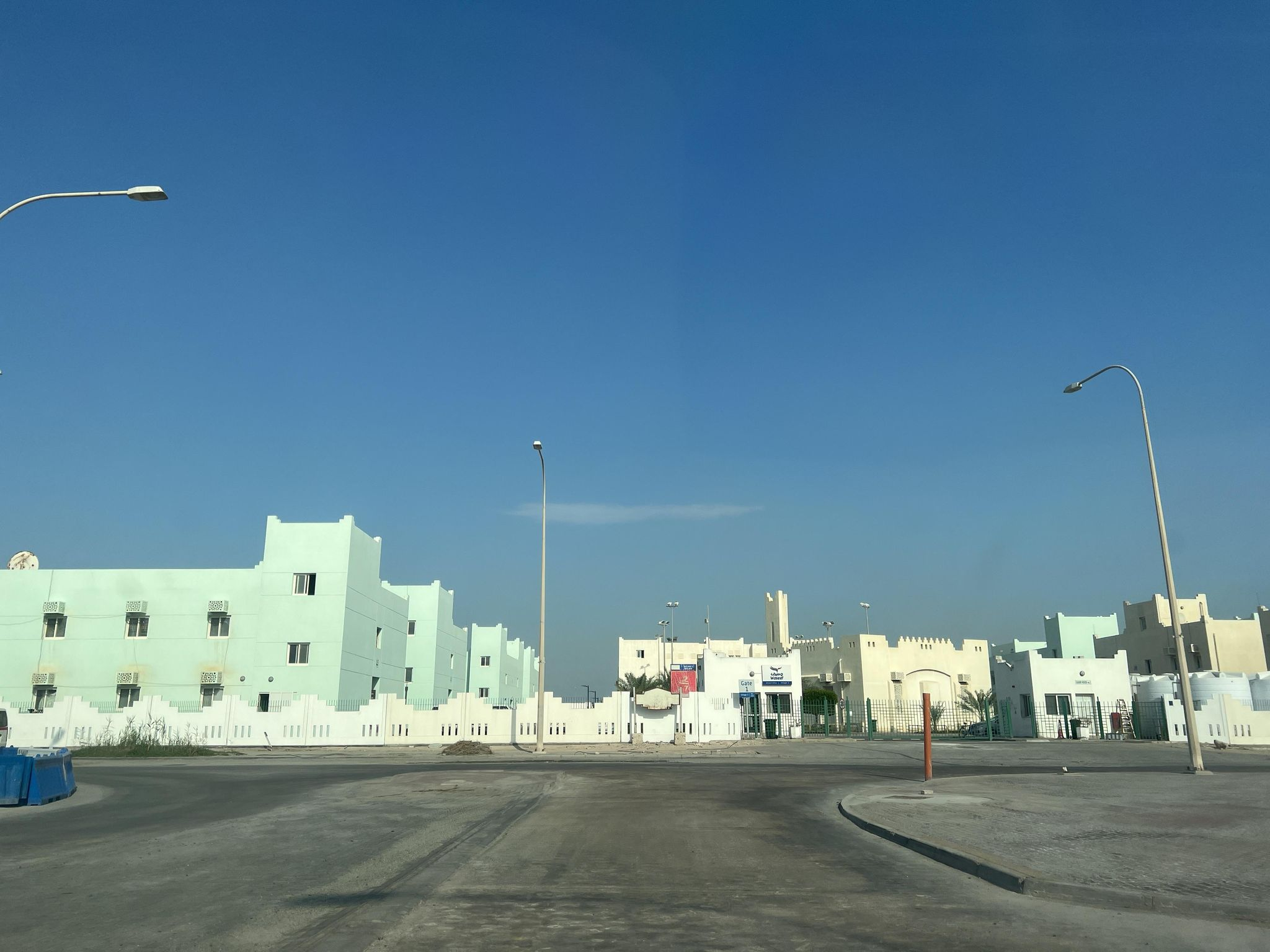
Waseef Village 3 on Eglat Faisal Street

The following table is a breakdown of registered live births by nationality and sex for Mesaieed. Places of birth are based on the home municipality of the mother at birth.

Registered live births by nationality and sex
| Year | Qatari | | | Non-Qatari | | | Total | | |
| Year | M | F | Total | M | F | Total | M | F | Total |
|---|---|---|---|---|---|---|---|---|---|
| 2001 | 3 | 1 | 4 | 31 | 38 | 69 | 34 | 39 | 73 |
| 2002 | 2 | 0 | 2 | 32 | 18 | 50 | 34 | 18 | 52 |
| 2003 | 1 | 2 | 3 | 29 | 23 | 52 | 30 | 25 | 55 |
| 2004 | 1 | 3 | 4 | 48 | 55 | 103 | 49 | 58 | 107 |
| 2005 | 3 | 2 | 5 | 33 | 32 | 65 | 36 | 34 | 70 |
| 2006 | 2 | 3 | 5 | 31 | 39 | 70 | 33 | 42 | 75 |
| 2007 | 1 | 2 | 3 | 40 | 21 | 61 | 41 | 23 | 64 |
