= Saleh Mohammad Al Nabit =

Qatari government official (born 1965)

Saleh bin Mohammed Al Nabit الدكتور صالح بن محمد النابت
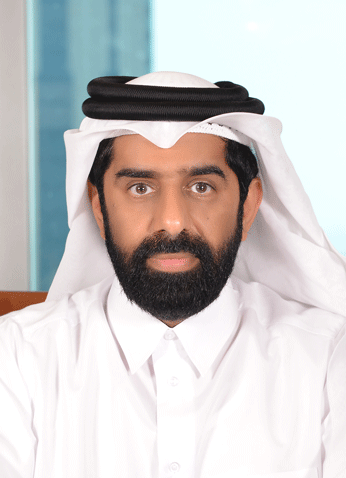
- Born: March 30, 1965 (age 61); Qatar
- Education: Qatar University
- Occupations: Minister of Development Planning and Statistics

Saleh bin Mohammed Al-Nabit (Arabic: سعادة الدكتور صالح بن محمد النابت) is a Qatari government official who serves on the Cabinet of Qatar as the Minister of Development Planning and Statistics. He was appointed to the position in June 2013.

Before being appointed to his current post, he served as the Secretary-General of the General Secretariat for Development Planning. He has published research papers and studies in the areas of planning, economic and social development, and the economics of banks and financial institutions.

== Education ==
Al Nabit received a Bachelor of Economics from Qatar University, where he graduated summa cum laude. He was awarded the Hamad bin Abdullah Al Thani prize for top student in 1988. He went on to attain a master's degree in business administration (with distinction) from Saint Louis University in the US and a PhD in development economics from the University of Bradford in the United Kingdom.

== Career ==
=== Early career ===
He worked at the Qatar Central Bank for a brief period before he started teaching economics and finance courses at Qatar University in 1993. In addition to teaching courses, he was a member of the board of directors for both the university and the department. He stopped teaching classes at Qatar University in 2008. He also taught economic courses at Saint Louis University and the University of Bradford from 1995 to 2001.

=== General Secretariat for Development Planning ===
In 2001, he was appointed as the acting director of the Economic Development at the General Secretariat for Development Planning. He was later appointed as director of institutional development in 2008. From 2008 onwards, he worked closely with Ibrahim Ibrahim in preparing the Qatar National Vision 2030 and the National Development Strategy for 2011–2016. He was also appointed as a board member of the Arab Planning Institute during this period.

=== Ministry of Development Planning and Statistics ===
In June 2013, the Ministry of Development Planning and Statistics was founded after a merger between the General Secretariat for Development Planning and the Qatar Statistics Authority. Al Nabit was appointed as minister of the organization. In December 2014, he announced that the ministry would implement a modern statistics systems to assist in development and planning strategies. He also stated that the ministry was working on implementing a simplified population census system.
