= Hamad bin Jabor Al Thani =

Qatari government official

Hamad Bin Jabor Bin Jassim Al Thani
- Occupations: Director General of the GSDP and Chairman of QSA

Hamad bin Jabor bin Jassim bin Jabor bin Muhammed Al Thani was appointed by Emir of Qatar, Hamad bin Khalifa Al Thani, as the Director General of the General Secretariat for Development Planning (GSDP) and Chairman of Qatar Statistics Authority (QSA) in 2007.

Hamad is in charge of day-to-day management at GSDP, whose Secretary General is Ibrahim Ibrahim. He played a role in the Knowledge-based economy (KBE) and Small and medium enterprises (SME) projects.

Hamad is a member of the board of directors of Hamad Medical Corporation (HMC), Qatar Chemical Company (Q-Chem), Qatar Electricity and Water Company (QEWC), Qatar National Bank (QNB), and IctQATAR, and Qatar Finance. He is also a member of the Board of Trustees of Qatar University, Chairman of the Permanent Population Committee (PPC), a member of the Governing Board for UNESCO Institute for Statistics, Ultimate Resource – Qatar Finance and a Deputy Chairman of the AIDS Control Committee. Currently he is the Chair of ISI Al-Khawarezmi Committee.

He was involved in the development of Qatar National Vision 2030, the National Development Strategy 2011-2016, and the creation of the Qatar Statistics Authority. He also supervised the preparation of the National Strategy for the Development of Statistics, directed the 2010 National Census, and established the National Population Policy and the Qatar Information Exchange (QALAM).

For four years Hamad was the Secretary General of the Planning Council and planned Qatar’s social and economic policies.

He worked in Qatar Petroleum (QP) for fifteen years, occupying various posts including the position of Human Resource Manager, and later on the Director of Administration. He is known for having transformed Qatar Petroleum to become a learning and performance-based corporation, and created the Oil & Gas Industry Strategic Qatarisation Plan.

Sheikh Hamad received a bachelor's degree in Business Administration from Metropolitan State College in the United States.

He has three sons, Jabor, Jassim and Fahad.

== Sources ==
- https://web.archive.org/web/20090918113410/http://www.gsdp.gov.qa/
- https://web.archive.org/web/20080821114004/http://www.qsa.gov.qa/
