= Ministry of Development Planning and Statistics =

Ministry of Development Planning and Statistics وزارة التخطيط التنموي والإحصاء
- Logo of The Ministry of Development Planning and Statistics
- Abbreviation: MDPS
- Formation: June 2013
- Dissolved: November 2018
- Type: GO
- Purpose: Government, Social, Environmental and Economic Development. Also, coordinates plans, strategies and policies in support of Qatar National Vision 2030 and Statistics
- Location: Doha
- Region served: State of Qatar
- Official language: Arabic
- Minister: Dr. Saleh Mohammad Al Nabit
- Main organ: Ministry of Development Planning and Statistics
- Website: http://www.mdps.gov.qa/

The Ministry of Development Planning and Statistics (Arabic: وزارة التخطيط التنموي والإحصاء) was a government ministry of Qatar, established through an Emiri Decision in June 2013. It was abolished in November 2018 and succeeded by the Planning and Statistics Authority, which was in turn replaced by the National Planning Council in May 2024.

== History ==
On 26 June 2013, the Emir Sheikh Tamim bin Hamad Al Thani issued the Emiri Order No. 4 of 2013 forming the cabinet. In this order, the Ministry of Development Planning and Statistics was founded and Dr. Saleh Mohamed Salem Al Nabit was appointed as Minister of Development Planning and Statistics. It was formed as a result of a merger between the General Secretariat for Development Planning (GSDP) and Qatar Statistics Authority (QSA).

In March 2018, the ministry coordinated the development of Qatar's Second National Development Strategy (2018–2022), which was created to achieve the goals of the Qatar National Vision 2030 initiative. Over 150 participants from more than 50 government and non-government organisations were involved in the process.

== Functions ==
In 2015, the ministry conducted a simplified population census, recording a population of approximately 2.4 million, a 40% increase since the 2010 census. The ministry also produced regular statistical publications, including labour force surveys and quarterly national accounts. One such publication was the quarterly Window on Economic Statistics of Qatar report, which covered economic indicators such as gross domestic product, consumer prices, and foreign trade.

== Responsibilities ==
The ministry was responsible for coordinating Qatar's national development planning and overseeing the country's official statistical system. Its responsibilities included preparing national development strategies, monitoring their implementation, supporting planning activities across government agencies, and ensuring that development priorities aligned with the state budget. The ministry also conducted censuses and surveys and published official statistics.
