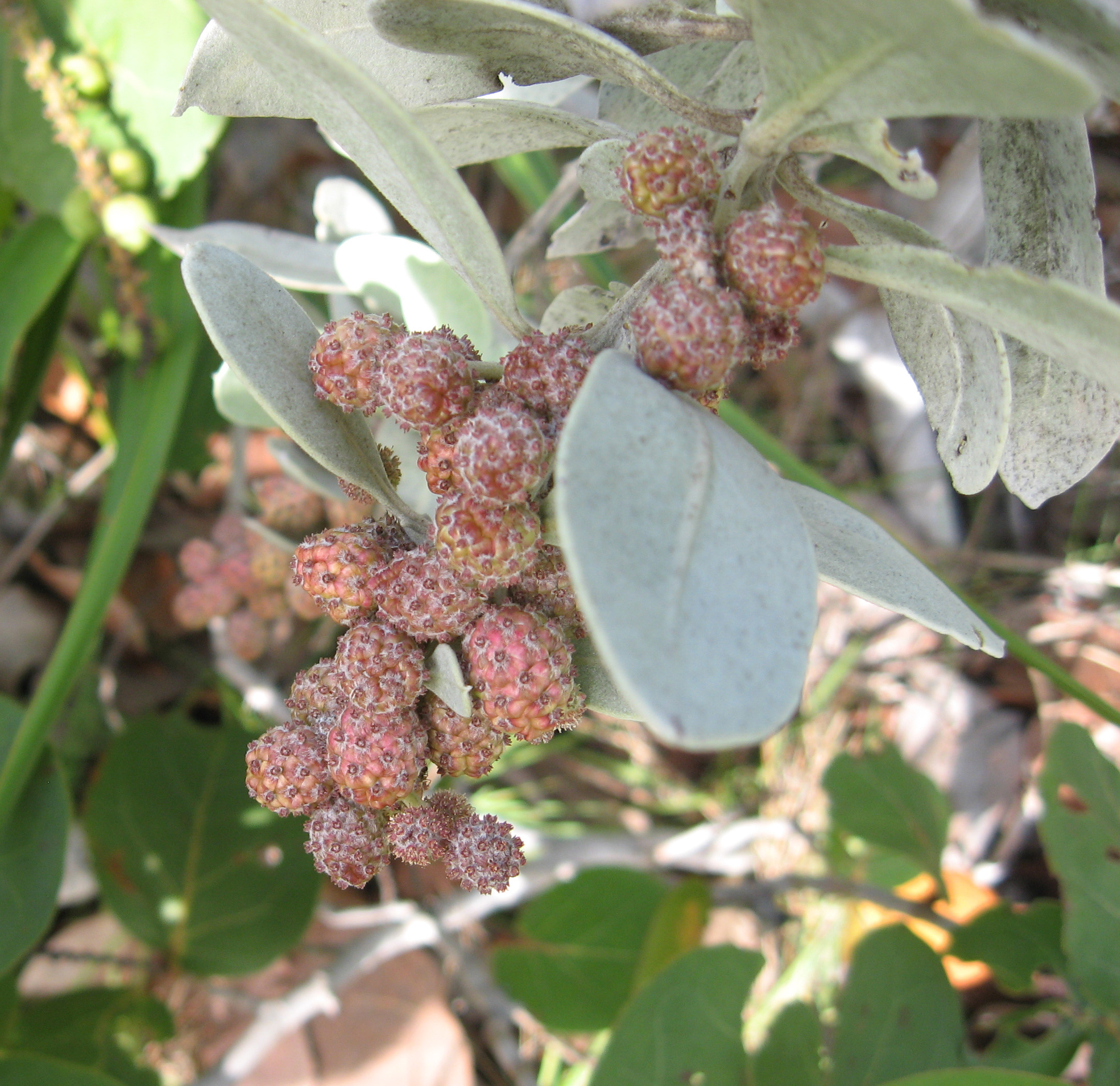
- Conocarpus erectus var. sericeus in Key Largo, Florida, United States

Conservation status
- Least Concern (IUCN 3.1)

Scientific classification
- Kingdom: Plantae
- Clade: Tracheophytes
- Clade: Angiosperms
- Clade: Eudicots
- Clade: Rosids
- Order: Myrtales
- Family: Combretaceae
- Genus: Conocarpus
- Species: C. erectus

Binomial name
- Conocarpus erectus L., 1753

= Conocarpus erectus =

Species of flowering plant

Conocarpus erectus, commonly called buttonwood or button mangrove, is a hardy species of mangrove shrub in the family Combretaceae.

== Taxonomy ==
These two varieties are not accepted as distinct by all authorities:

- C. e. var. erectus - green buttonwood, leaves thinly hairy or hairless
- C. e. var. sericeus - silver buttonwood, leaves densely silvery-hairy

== Distribution and habitat ==
It grows on shorelines in tropical and subtropical regions of the Americas and west Africa. It is generally found growing in brackish water in tidal lagoons and bays, but can grow in inland habitats, with records at up to 745 m (2,444 ft) altitude in Costa Rica. Locations it is known from include Florida, Bermuda, the West Indies, Central and South America from Mexico to Brazil on the Atlantic Coast and Mexico to Peru on the Pacific Coast, as well as the western African coast. It was introduced in Kuwait and Western Australia due to its propensity to thrive in high temperatures and absorbing brackish water.

== Description ==
Conocarpus erectus is usually a dense multiple-trunked shrub, 1–4 m (3.3–13.1 ft) tall, but can grow into a tree up to 20 m (66 ft) or more tall, with a trunk up to 1 m (3.3 ft) in diameter. The United States National Champion green buttonwood is 35 ft (11 m) tall, has a spread of 70 ft (21 m), and a circumference of 207 in (530 cm). The bark is thick and has broad plates of thin scales which are gray to brown. The twigs are brittle, and angled or narrowly winged in cross-section. The leaves are alternately arranged, simple and oblong, 2–7 cm (0.79–2.76 in) long (rarely to 10 cm or 3.9 in long) and 1–3 cm (0.39–1.18 in) broad, with a tapering tip and an entire margin. They are dark green and shiny on top, and paler with fine silky hairs underneath, and have two salt glands at the base of each leaf. The fruits are button-like (from which the common names derive), 5–8 mm (0.20–0.31 in) diameter, with no petals; they are produced in stalked panicles of 35-56 flowers. The fruit is a cluster of red to brown, small scaly, two-winged cone-like seeds, 5–15 mm (0.20–0.59 in) long. The seed heads burst when ripe, and the seeds are dispersed by water.

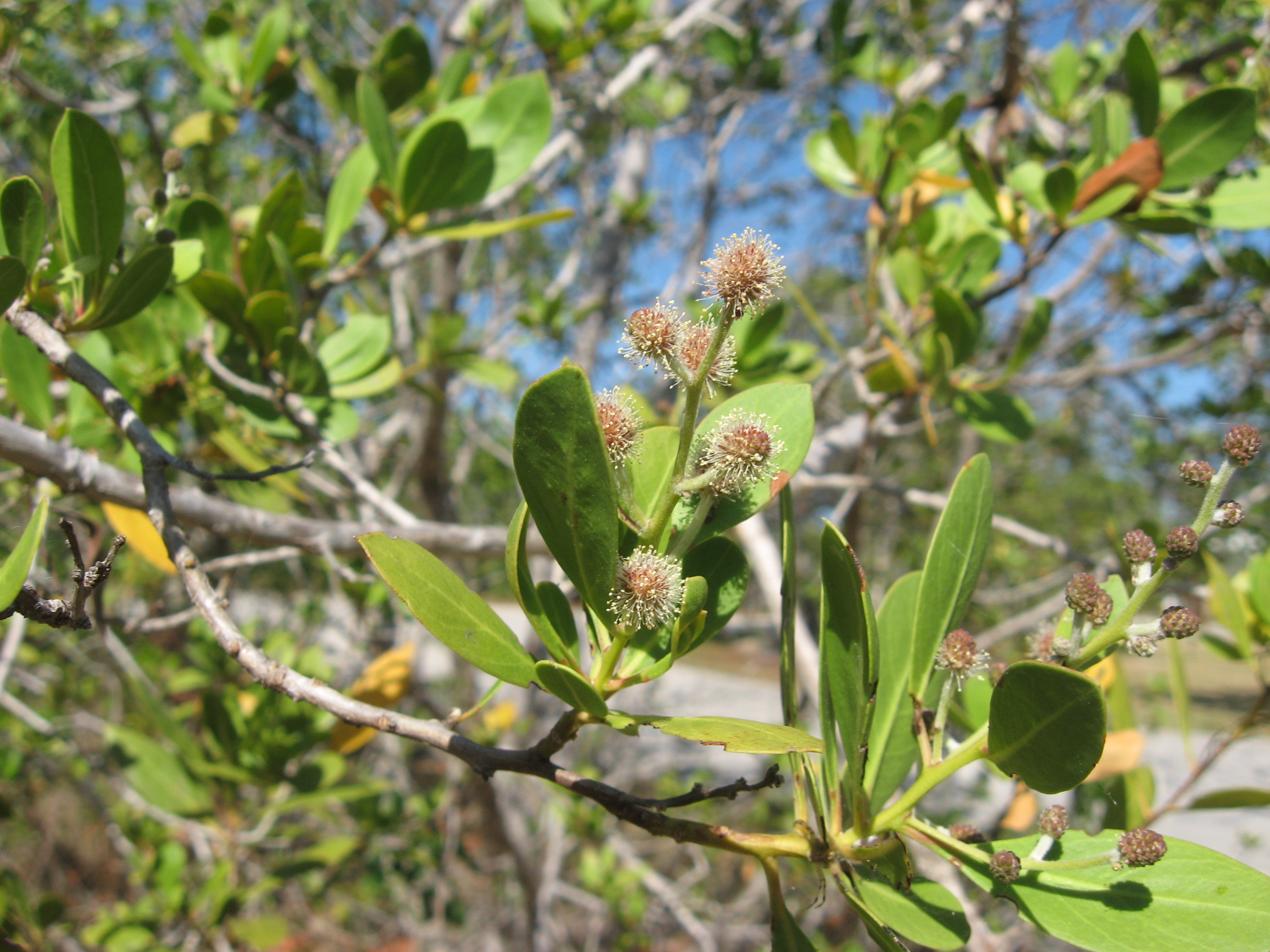
Conocarpus erectus var. erectus

== Uses ==
The tree is used as an ornamental plant and in bonsai. The variety sericeus, with silvery leaves, is especially prized for landscaping. It is an important host plant for epiphytes. As a result of ornamental planting, it has become naturalized in Hawaii. It has been used extensively in landscaping in Kuwait and became the most abundant tree/shrub.

The wood is sometimes used in cabinets; it is difficult to work but takes a smooth finish. It is also used as firewood, and is reported to be good for smoking meat and fish, as it burns very hot and slowly; it also makes high quality charcoal. The bark is high in tannin, for which it has been harvested commercially.

== Gallery ==

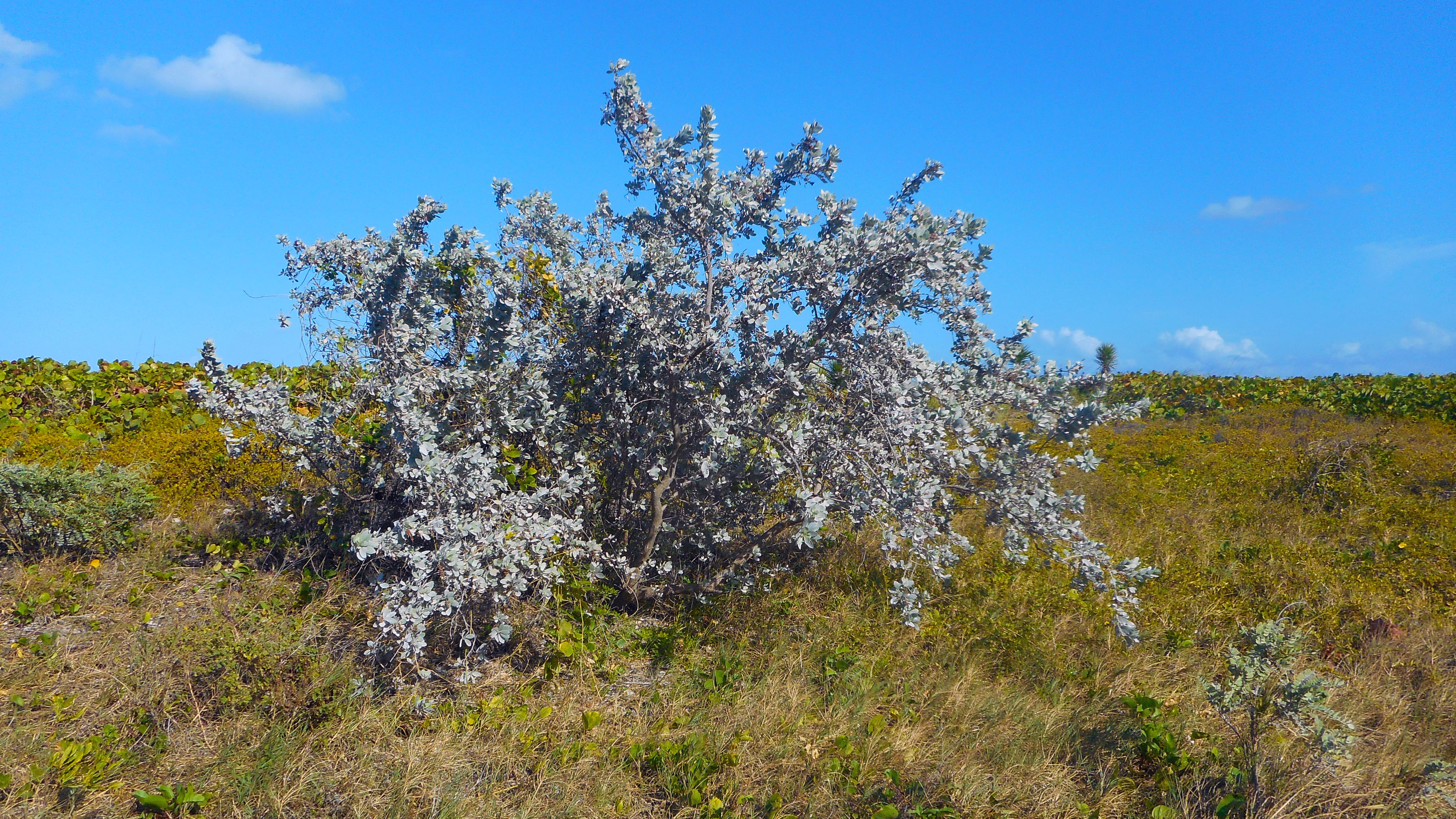
Silver buttonwood

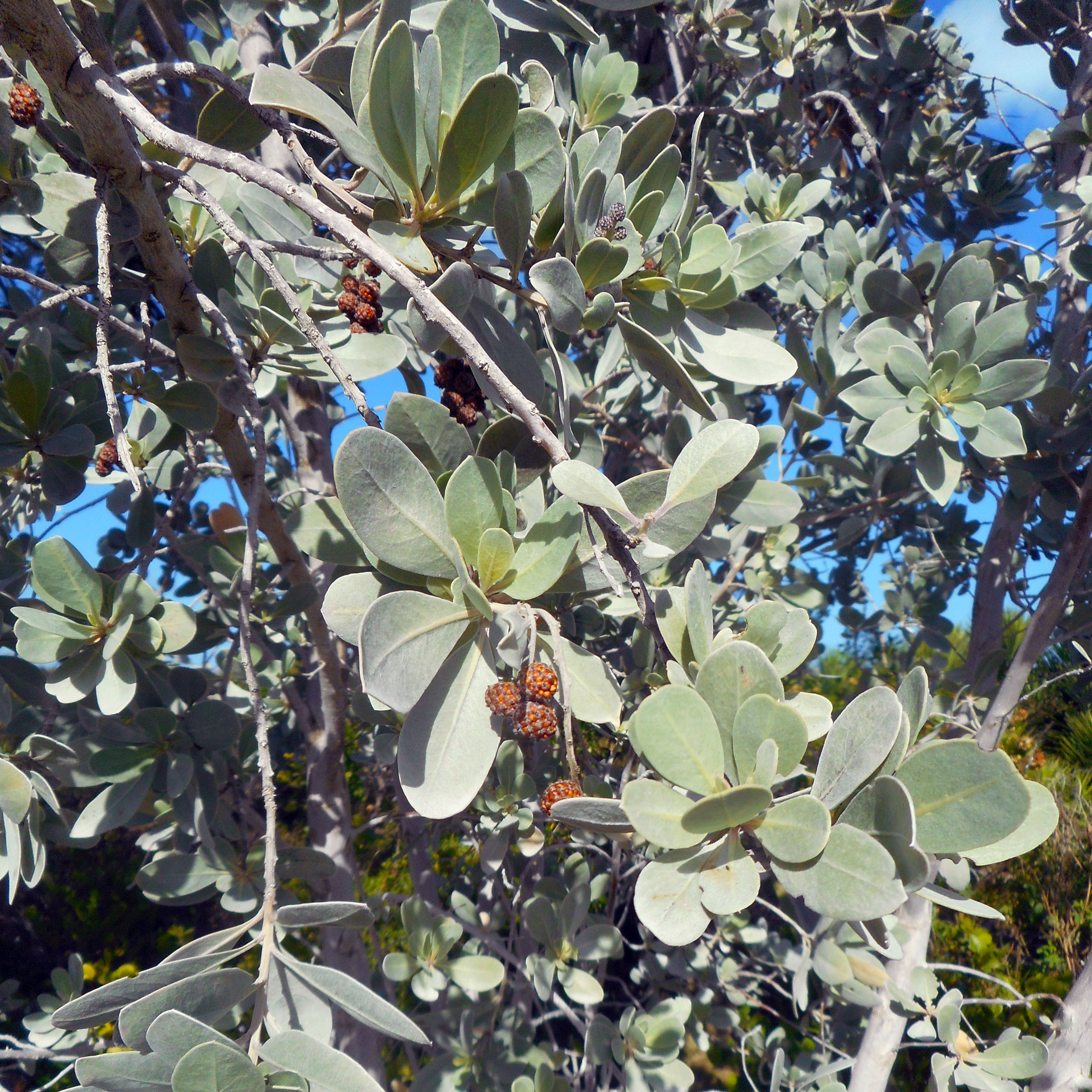
Detail - leaves and fruit

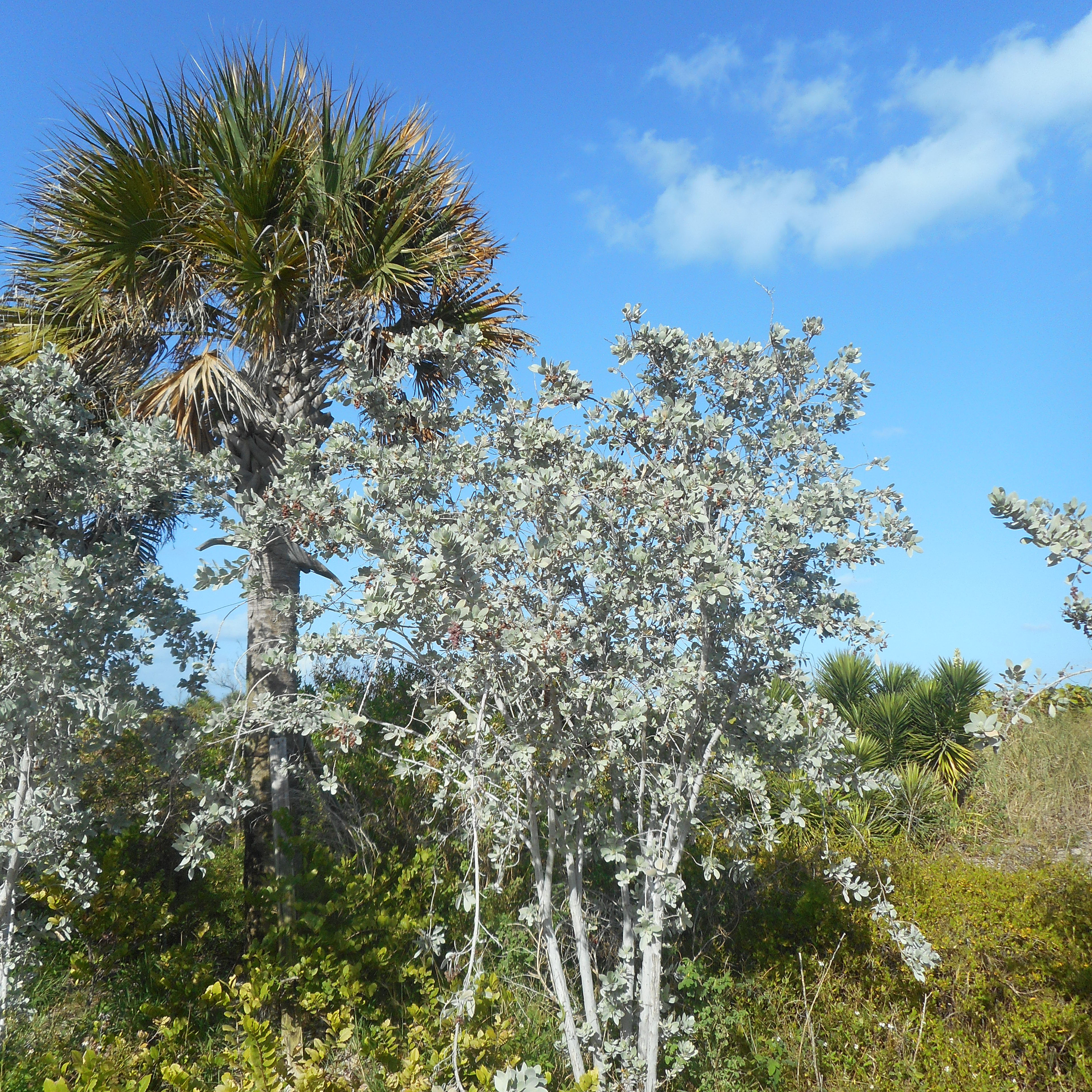
Silver buttonwood and palm

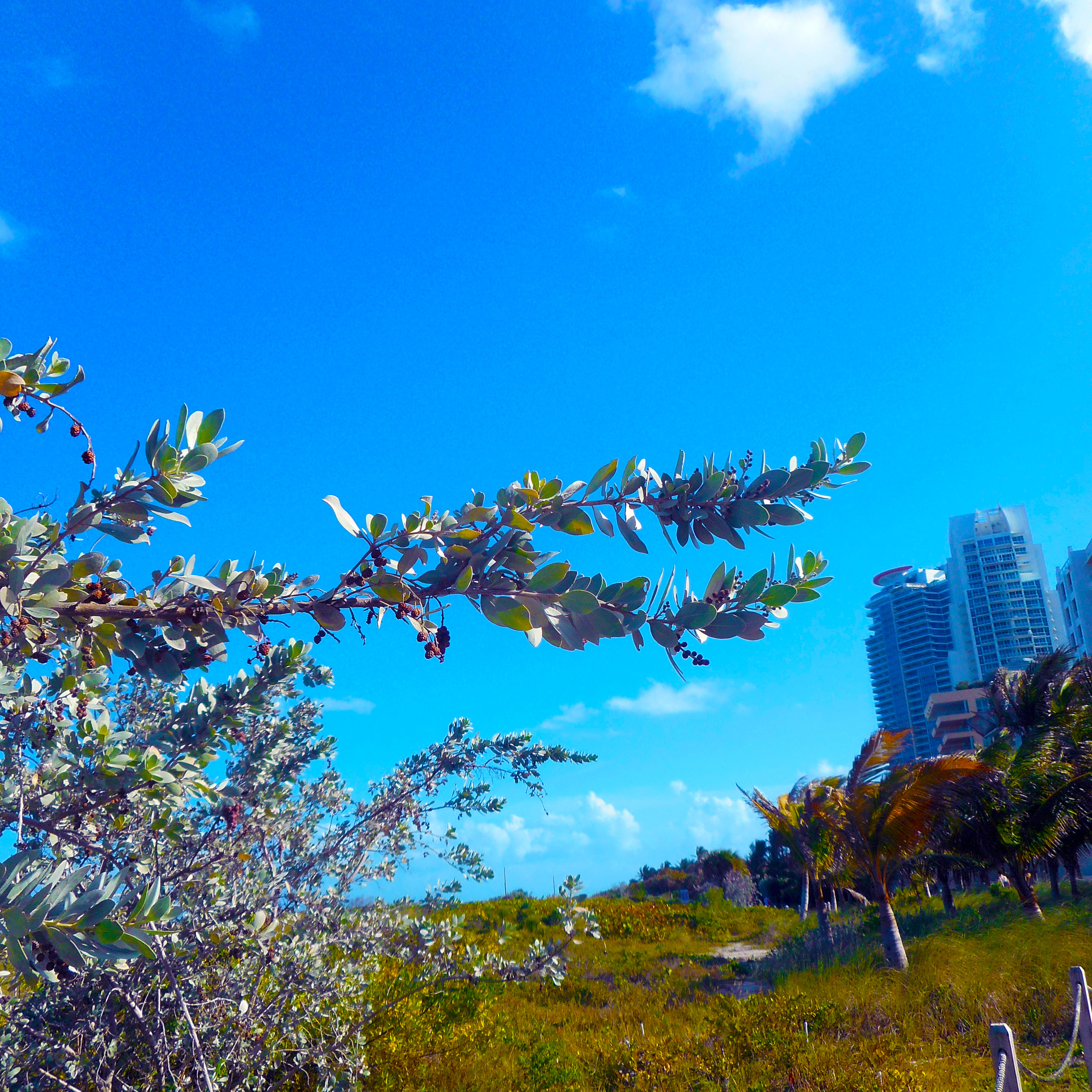
Silver buttonwood and coconut palms

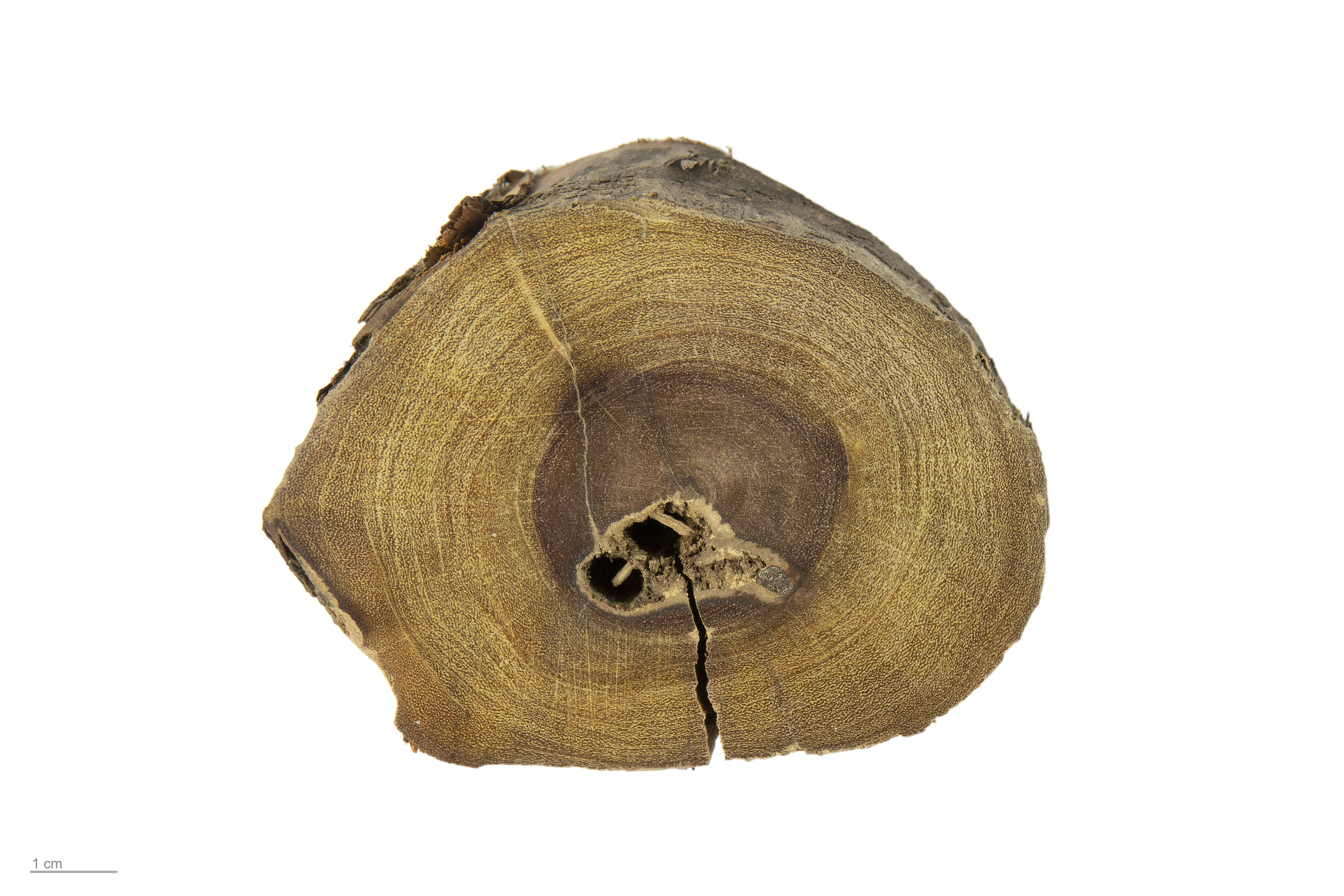
Conocarpus erectus - MHNT
