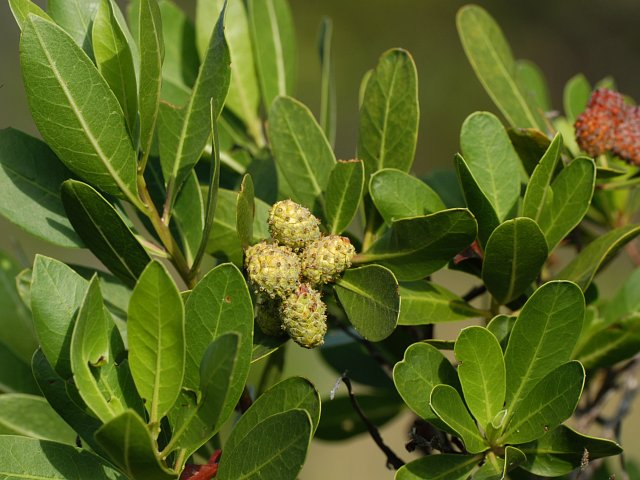
- Conocarpus erectus

Scientific classification
- Kingdom: Plantae
- Clade: Tracheophytes
- Clade: Angiosperms
- Clade: Eudicots
- Clade: Rosids
- Order: Myrtales
- Family: Combretaceae
- Genus: Conocarpus; L.

Species
- See text

Synonyms
- Rudbeckia Adans.

= Conocarpus =

Genus of flowering plants

Conocarpus is a genus of two species of flowering plants in the family Combretaceae, native to tropical regions of the world. One of the species is a widespread mangrove species, and the other is restricted to a small area around the southern Red Sea coasts, where it grows alongside seasonal rivers.

They are dense multiple-trunked shrubs or small to medium-sized trees from 1 to 20 m tall.

The generic name is derived from the Greek words κονος (konos), meaning "cone" and καρπος (karpos) meaning "fruit".

== Distribution ==
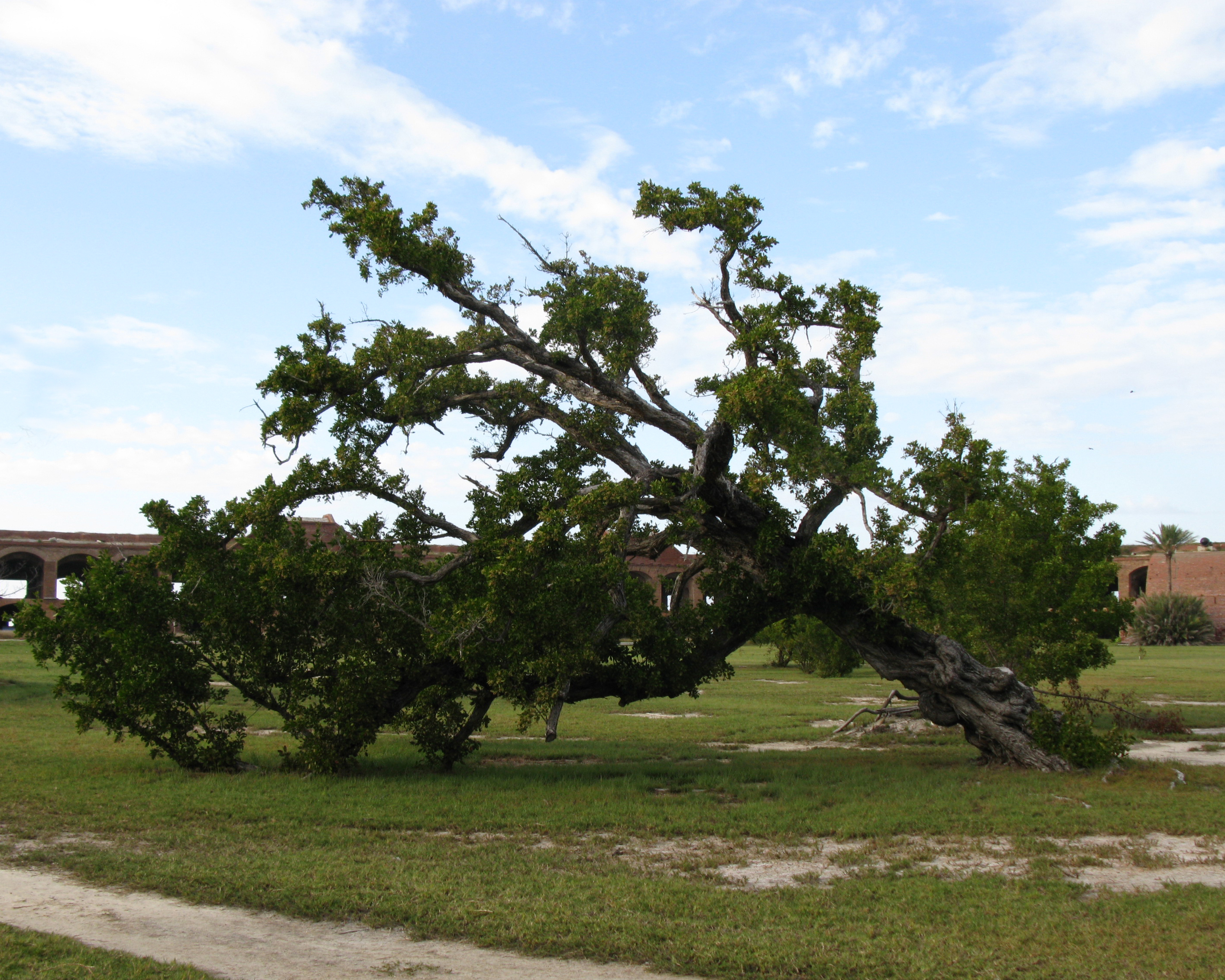
Buttonwood tree at Fort Jefferson in the Dry Tortugas

C. erectus is native to the coasts of tropical America from Bermuda, the Bahamas, and southern Florida through the West Indies, from Mexico south on the Gulf of Mexico, Caribbean, and Atlantic Coasts to Brazil, and on the Pacific Coast from Mexico to Peru, including the Galapagos Islands, and on the coast of western Africa from Senegal to the Democratic Republic of the Congo. It has been rarely introduced elsewhere. C. lancifolius is native to Somalia and Yemen, and is cultivated in eastern and northern Africa and the Arabian peninsula.

== List of species ==
- Conocarpus acuminatus Roxb. ex DC. synonym of Anogeissus acuminata (Roxb. ex DC.) Wall. ex Guillem. & Perr.
- Conocarpus acutifolius Willd. ex Schult. synonym of Conocarpus erectus L.
- Conocarpus erectus L.
  - C. e. var. arboreus DC. synonym of Conocarpus erectus L.
  - C. e. var. argenteus Millsp. synonym of Conocarpus erectus L.
  - C. e. f.erectus synonym of Conocarpus erectus L.
  - C. e. var. erectus synonym of Conocarpus erectus L.
  - C. e. var. procumbens DC. synonym of Conocarpus erectus L.
  - C. e. f. sericeus (E.Forst. ex DC.) Stace synonym of Conocarpus erectus L.
  - C. e. var. sericeus E.Forst. ex DC. synonym of Conocarpus erectus L.
- Conocarpus hirtus Buch.-Ham. ex Wall. (Unresolved)
- Conocarpus lanceolatus B.Heyne ex Wall. (Unresolved)
- Conocarpus lancifolius Engl.
- Conocarpus latifolius Roxb. ex DC. synonym of Anogeissus latifolia (Roxb. ex DC.) Wall. ex Guillem. & Perr.
- Conocarpus leiocarpus DC. synonym of Anogeissus leiocarpa (DC.) Guill. & Perr.
- Conocarpus monocarpus Steud. (Unresolved)
- Conocarpus myrtifolius Buch.-Ham. ex Wall. synonym of Anogeissus pendula Edgew.
- Conocarpus niloticus Delile ex Steud. (Unresolved)
- Conocarpus novae-zeylandiae Cels ex Ten. (Unresolved)
- Conocarpus parvifolius Hochst. ex A.Rich. (Unresolved)
- Conocarpus procumbens L. synonym of Conocarpus erectus L.
- Conocarpus pubescens Schumach. & Thonn. (Unresolved)
- Conocarpus racemosus L. synonym of Laguncularia racemosa (L.) C.F.Gaertn.
- Conocarpus schimperi Hochst. ex A.Rich. synonym of Anogeissus leiocarpa (DC.) Guill. & Perr.
- Conocarpus sericeus J.R.Forst. ex G.Don synonym of Conocarpus erectus L.
- Conocarpus sericeus (Griseb.) Jiménez synonym of Conocarpus erectus L.
- Conocarpus supina Crantz synonym of Conocarpus erectus L.

=== Formerly placed here ===
- Anogeissus acuminata (Roxb. ex DC.) Wall. ex Guill. & Perr. (as C. acuminatus Roxb. ex DC.)
- Anogeissus latifolia (Roxb. ex DC.) Wall. ex Guill. & Perr. (as C. latifolius Roxb. ex DC.)
- Anogeissus leiocarpa (DC.) Guill. & Perr. (as C. leiocarpus DC.)
- Anogeissus pendula Edgew.
- Laguncularia racemosa (L.) C.F.Gaertn. (as C. racemosus L.)
