= Permanent Population Committee =

Permanent Population Committee اللجنة الدائمة للسكان
- Logo of The Permanent Population Committee
- Abbreviation: PPC
- Formation: 2004
- Type: GO
- Purpose: Population Policy
- Location: Doha
- Region served: State of Qatar
- Official language: Arabic
- President: Sheikh Hamad Bin Jabor Bin Jassim Al Thani
- Main organ: Permanent Population Committee
- Website: http://www.ppc.gov.qa/

The Permanent Population Committee (PPC) (Arabic: اللجنة الدائمة للسكان) is a national authority in the state of Qatar whose goal is to understand the population requirements for sustainable development. To do so, PPC bases its action on Islamic Sharia principles and communal values and traditions in line with the political foundations of the Qatar Permanent Constitution, the National Vision, the relevant Millennium Development Goals (MDGs), the Cooperation Council for the Arab States of the Gulf (GCC) population policies and other related regional and international guidelines. The PPC is charged with the implementation of the outcomes identified by the general framework of the GCC population strategy adopted by the GCC Supreme Council during its Nineteenth Session, held in Abu Dhabi in 1998. This strategy prompted each member state to establish a higher population committee responsible for developing national population policies. Accordingly, the PPC was established by the Council of Ministers decision number (24) in 2004 with defined responsibilities and committee membership. Sheikh Tamim bin Hamad Al Thani, the deputy emir and heir apparent, endorsed the decision.

Pursuant to the Council Ministers' decision No (11) 2009 the General Secretariat for Development Planning (GSDP) has supervision over the Permanent Population Committee and is independent in assuming its technical works. The Committee has a budget attached to that of the GSDP.

== Vision and strategy ==
The main goal of the PPC is to improve the quality of life for the population of Qatar. The PPC looks to expand opportunities for individuals and families, enhance individual capabilities, increase participation in socio-economic activities, encourage political and cultural progress, improve living standards, and provide a clean environment so that people benefit from healthy food, pure water and sustainable health care. All Qatari residents need to live in appropriate housing, practice safe activities, and be assured of equal rights for all. To establish values of justice, fairness and fraternity, the vision ensures the preservation of rights and brotherhood for future generations and the guarantee of the appropriate use of the country's wealth, resources and capacities.

== Goals and objectives ==
The main objective of the PPC is the development of the population policy of Qatar. This objective is linked to a number of sub-goals, with the most prominent being the following:

- Monitor the population policy implementation by using a scientific approach and studying the various proposals of the relevant agencies entrusted with implementation.
- Develop an institutional framework to coordinate efforts among inline ministries, government agencies, non-government organizations, and regional and international organizations concerned with population related issues for the implementation of national population policy programs.
- Monitor processes aimed at integrating population policy goals within global development plans, specifically within plans related to social, health, education, media, culture and environment.
- Conduct population related studies and research to assess the social situation of the state, ensuring an appropriate level of quality and objectivity, to assist in designing population policies and programs.

== Technical Bureau ==
The Technical Bureau of the PPC is entrusted with the day-to-day operations as instructed by the PPC. The Technical Bureau's key tasks are as follows:

- Follow up on the implementation of the PPC's decisions and recommendations, the preparation of periodical reports concerned with the committee's activities and achievements, and the production of various documents related to PPC functions, minutes of meetings and correspondence.
- Analysis of population census and survey results, especially those related directly to population policies and programs, and the use of these results to develop procedures and activities aimed at attaining PPC objectives.
- Implementation of desk and field studies, and research to diagnose different population trends, assess implications, and propose policy changes, particularly for issues of population makeup, growth, and family-related components.
- Monitor PPC sub-committees functions and workgroups entrusted with specialized studies and research needed for the committee's deliberation.
- Development of technical and administrative staff capabilities, as well as related national organization's and institution's focal points to benefit from the expertise and technical assistance provided by relevant regional and international organizations.
- Organization of PPC conferences, symposiums and workshops scheduled to discuss population policy issues.
- Establishment and implementation of media plans to enhance population awareness and generate appropriate interaction among various community groups.

=== Research study and information service ===
The Technical Bureau is responsible to receive the requests and to execute the studies about population in Qatar. Inaddtion, it is responsible to implementation of desk and field studies, and research to diagnose different population trends, assess implications, and propose policy changes, particularly for issues of population makeup, growth, and family-related components.

== Members ==
The PPC is formed from representatives from government agencies and non government organizations dealing with population issues Qatar. These are:

- The General Director of the General Secretariat for Development Planning, president (Sheikh Hamad bin Jabor Al Thani).
- The Director of the Technical Bureau of the PPC, vice president.
- A representative of the General Secretariat for Development Planning, reporter.
- A representative of the Ministry of Defense, member.
- A representative of the Ministry of Interior, member.
- A representative of the Ministry of Labour, member.
- A representative of the Ministry of Health, member.
- A representative of the Supreme Education Council, member.
- A representative of the Ministry of Social Affairs, member.
- A representative of QatarEnergy, member.
- A representative of Qatar Chamber of Commerce and Industry, member.

== Population policy ==
Population policy determines the principles, objectives and policies adopted by Qatar in regards to population issues for the purpose of influencing the population status, including variables in population growth and its main elements (fertility, births, deaths, geographical distribution, immigration, population composition such as population youthfulness or rising rate of elderly people), as well as general issues relating to health and education.

Population policy forms a large umbrella policy covering all programs and activities directly and indirectly influencing population variables.

Population policy focuses on premises and constants based on society’s culture and values.

=== Bases of population policy ===
The Qatari population policy is based on the provisions of Sharia (Islamic law), the Qatari Constitution, heritage and societal values derived from the original national Qatari heritage as well as statements by Sheikh Hamad bin Khalifa Al Thani, Emir of Qatar, in various fields linked to the welfare and empowerment of the Qatari national in different domains.

=== Population policy objectives ===
Population policy objectives aim at striking a balance in Qatar between population and economic, social and environmental resources, family development and coherence, women’s empowerment, consolidation of gender values of justice, development of reproductive health so as to secure provision of family and child health services, stressing the need for continued action for the attainment of safe motherhood and sound childhood programs, population protection from the effects of deterioration of the environment surrounding it as well as from unsustainable and unjust production and consumption patterns.

== Sources ==
- The Permanent Population Committee (PPC) official website
- The General Secretariat for Development Planning official website
