= Ibrahim Ibrahim (economist) =

Qatari economist

Ibrahim Ibrahim الدكتور إبراهيم إبراهيم
- Occupations: Economic Advisor to Sheikh Hamad bin Khalifa Al Thani and executive member of the Supreme Committee for Development Planning

Ibrahim Ibrahim (Arabic: الدكتور إبراهيم إبراهيم) is a Qatari economist who served as the Secretary General for the General Secretariat for Development Planning (GSDP) from 2006 until June 2011. He became an Economic Advisor to Sheikh Hamad bin Khalifa Al Thani, the Emir Qatar, from 1988 to 2013.

== Role in QNV2030 ==
He was a leader in the development of the Qatar National Vision 2030 project.

== Other positions ==
Ibrahim has worked in the oil and gas industry. He is the Vice Chairman of the Board of RasGas Company Limited and Chairman of the Marketing Committee. He is a member of the Board of Directors of QatarEnergy, Qatar Gas and Industries Qatar a Vice Chairman of the Board of Directors of Qatar Petroleum International and Industrial Bank and member of the Board of Qatar Central Bank.

== Previous occupations ==
Ibrahim was an Associate Professor of Business, Economics and Quantitative methods at the University of Hawaiʻi from 1970 to 1978, Director of the Economic Department of the Organization of Arab Petroleum Exporting Countries, Kuwait from 1979 to 1986, and a Senior Economist at the Oxford Institute for Energy Studies from 1986 to 1988.

== Awards ==
In 2009, Ibrahim was honoured with the ‘Liquefied Natural Gas (LNG) Visionary Award’ at a special ceremony held at the CWC World LNG Summit in Barcelona, Spain.

== Education ==
Ibrahim holds a Ph.D. in Business Administration from New York University in 1969.
