= General Secretariat for Development Planning =

Qatari governmental agency

The General Secretariat for Development Planning الأمانة العامة للتخطيط التنموي
- Logo of The General Secretariat for Development Planning
- Abbreviation: GSDP
- Formation: July 2006
- Type: GO
- Purpose: Government, Social, Environmental and Economic Development. Also, coordinates plans, strategies and policies in support of Qatar's National Vision 2030
- Location: Doha
- Region served: State of Qatar
- Official language: Arabic
- Secretary General: Saleh Mohammad Al Nabit
- Main organ: General Secretariat for Development Planning
- Website: http://www.gsdp.gov.qa/

The General Secretariat for Development Planning (GSDP) (Arabic: الأمانة العامة للتخطيط التنموي) is a governmental agency in the State of Qatar, established through Emiri Decision No (39) in 2006 and amended by Emiri Decision No (50) in 2009. The GSDP coordinates plans, strategies and policies in support of Qatar's National Vision 2030.

The Secretariat reports to the Sheikh Tamim Bin Hamad Al Thani, the Heir Apparent to the Qatar Emirate. On June 7, 2011, the Deputy Emir and Heir Apparent Sheikh Tamim Bin Hamad Al-Thani issued Emiri Decision No 36 of 2011, appointing Saleh Mohammad Al Nabit as Secretary General of the General Secretariat for Development Planning.

Following the Council Ministers' decision No (11) 2009 the General Secretariat for Development Planning has supervision over the Permanent Population Committee (Arabic: اللجنة الدائمة للسكان) and is independent in its technical works. The committee has a budget attached to that of the GSDP.

== History ==
The General Secretariat for Development Planning (GSDP) came into being in July 2006 with Ibrahim Ibrahim as its secretary general. Sheikh Hamad bin Jabor Al Thani is GSDP's Director General and was responsible for the day-to-day management of the organisation. On June 7, 2011, Saleh Mohammad Al Nabit was appointed as the new secretary general of GSDP.

== Role and function of GSDP ==
The General Secretariat for Development Planning (GSDP) monitors the implementation of the Qatar National Vision 2030 (QNV 2030), for which purpose it carries out the following tasks:

- prepare the National Development Strategy (NDS) for the achievement of the Qatar National Vision 2030– stating in it the development priorities, the quantitative objectives in the economic, social and demographic fields as well as determining the mechanisms necessary for achieving them – after consultation with government agencies and surveying the opinion of the private sector and civil society organisations.
- explain the Qatar National Vision 2030 and the National Development Strategy to all agencies, stakeholders and civil society organisations.
- conduct research and studies related to the Qatar National Vision 2030 and the National Development Strategy.
- explain the Qatar National Vision 2030 and the National Development Strategy NDS to the agencies and provide technical assistance on the preparation of executive plans.
- review executive plans set by agencies to ensure coordination among these agencies; verify the consistency of these plans with the National Development Strategy to confirm there are no contradictions among the executive plans provided by the different State agencies, and inform the agencies and the higher authorities about any inconsistency identified.
- monitor the progress achieved in the implementation of the plans and prepare performance assessment reports.
- analyse the results of official statistical data and use the results in activating the General Secretariat's functions and preparation of plans.
- connect the planning with the official statistical indicators in the economic, social and demographic fields.
- activate the results of official statistical data in the formulation of the Qatar National Vision 2030 and in the preparation of related strategic plans.

== GSDP organization structure ==
GSDP has four departments and three units, arranged as follows:

Administrative units that report to the Secretary General:

- Secretary‐General's Office
- Public Relations and Communications Unit
- Internal Auditing Unit

Administrative units that report to Director General:

- Director‐General's Office
- Economic Development Department
- Social Development Department
- Institutional Development Department
- Joint Services Department
- Administration and Finance
- Information Technology
- Human Resource

=== The Public Relations and Communications Unit tasks ===
- Issue media programs, bulletins and newsletters that introduce the GSDP's roles, responsibilities and activities, in coordination with the concerned administrative unit.
- Follow up media stories and reports on the GSDP appeared in daily newspapers and other media and forward them to the concerned official for response.
- Arrange necessary preparations for the GSDP's guests, including hotel reservation, entry visa, hospitality arrangements, and welcome and farewell reception in coordination with the JSD.
- Organise social, cultural and sports activities for the GSDP's employees and oversee the organisation of festivals hosted or co-hosted by the GSDP.
- Organise conferences, seminars and exhibitions hosted by the GSDP and prepare their budgets, in coordination with the JSD.

=== The Internal Auditing Unit tasks ===
- Develop a draft for the GSDP's annual auditing plan and submit it to the Secretary General for approval and prepare reports on auditing results.
- Monitor the extent of implementation of laws, regulations and decisions related to the GSDP's activities.
- Verify the coherence and consistency of the work systems with the GSDP's responsibilities and objectives and submit necessary proposals in this regard.
- Monitor and maintain different the general ledger and financial documents, payment order, receipt invoices and other documents following the payment process.
- Examine the GSDP work problems and obstacles, review reasons behind work-related problems and propose appropriate solutions.
- Review the applied financial instructions, propose adequate changes and monitor the implementation.
- Monitor the procedures set for recruitment of employees, staff leave, promotion and other personnel-related issues and verify adherence to the applied laws, regulations, rules and decisions.
- Ensure accuracy of funds, furniture, equipment, buildings and assets owned or supervised by the GSDP.
- Participate in the inventory of the contents of the GSDP stores and assets.

=== The Economic Development Department (EDD) tasks ===
- Participate in setting a concept for the comprehensive vision and the general strategic plan for the economic development in the State.
- Assist the GSDP Director General in presenting the economic aspects of the comprehensive vision and the general strategic plan to the concerned agencies and stakeholders.
- Monitor and follow up of the growth of the State's economic development.
- Prepare studies on long-term economic development.
- Prepare studies on economic analysis and economic expectation.
- Activate the results of the statistical indicators and analysis adopted in the department activities.

=== The Social Development Department (SDD) tasks ===
- Participate in setting a concept for the comprehensive vision and the general strategic plan for the social development in the State.
- Assist the General Secretary in presenting the social aspects of the comprehensive vision and the general strategic plan to the stakeholders and concerned agencies and help them engage in the progress of the social development in the State.
- Monitor and follow up of the development of the demographic structure in the State in educational, labor, health and other aspects related to the social status.
- Prepare studies on long term social development.
- Utilize the results of the statistical indicators and analysis in the department activities.

=== The Institutional development Department (IDD) tasks ===
- Participate in setting a concept for the comprehensive vision and the general strategic plan for improving the performance of government agencies in the State.
- Conduct studies on the government agencies' performance and its progress through different stages for the purpose of implementing the development strategic plan.
- Propose economic activities and areas pursued by the private sector.
- Provide the necessary support to government agencies regarding the formulation of their strategic plans.
- Utilize the results of the statistical indicators and analysis in the department activities.
- Provide the necessary support to government agencies for building capacities in planning and institutional development areas.

=== The Joint Services Department (JSD) tasks ===
- Enforce financial and administrative laws, regulations and systems related to the GSDP functions.
- Carry out the GSDP legal affairs-related issues.
- Provide the GSDP administrative units with the required equipment and services necessary for performing their tasks, in coordination with other administrative units.
- Determine the GSDP's needs in terms of jobs and staff, in coordination with other administrative units.
- Determine the GSDP's training requirements, in coordination with different administrative units, implement training programs and evaluate the business impact and effectiveness of training programs.
- Carry out the procurement, tender and auction tasks according to the rules and systems applied in the State.
- Prepare different payment documents and orders and other financial transactions.
- Prepare the GSDP's estimated general budget.
- Oversee the implementation of financial statements, credits, auditing and revenues and expenditure tasks.
- Carry out all tasks related to the information systems and computer software and hardware.
- Carry out maintenance works necessary for the GSDP's buildings, facilities, tools and equipment in coordination with the concerned agencies.
- Provide administrative services and oversee the work of the GSDP's stores.
- Receive and record the incoming/outgoing mail and organize the GSDP's archive according to advanced filing methods.

== Supreme Committee for Development Planning ==
Sheikh Hamad bin Khalikfa Al-Thani, Emir of the State of Qatar, issued Emiri Decision No.77 of 2011 establishing the Supreme Committee for Development Planning. Chaired by Heir Apparent Sheikh Tamim Bin Hamad Al-Thani. The committee approves the future vision of the State of Qatar and supervise its implementation; endorses national strategies prepared by the GSDP to implement the future vision of the country and develop policies regarding strategic planning in the country in the light of the future vision and general policy of the state and oversee their implementation.

=== Members of the Committee ===
Sheikh Tamim bin Hamad Al Thani is Chairman of the Committee and H E Ahmad bin Abdullah Al Mahmoud, Deputy Prime Minister and Minister of State for Cabinet Affairs, H E Yousuf Hussein Kamal, Minister of Finance and Economy, H E Sheikh Jasim bin Abdul Aziz bin Jasim bin Hamad Al Thani, Minister of Business and Trade, Dr Salih bin Mohammad Al Nabit, Secretary General of General Secretariat of Development Planning (GSDP) are the members of the committee.

Dr. Ibrahim Ibrahim is executive member and two more experts of planning development are to be selected by the chairman.

== Qatar National Vision 2030 and the National Development Strategy ==
=== Qatar National Vision 2030 (QNV2030) ===
The Qatar National Vision 2030 (Arabic: الرؤية الوطنية لدولة قطر 2030) is a statement of Qatar's long-term strategy for modernization and economic growth. The Qatar National Vision 2030 is a statement of Qatar's strategic goals and the challenges that it faces and the opportunities ahead. It tries to balance Qatar's culture and traditions with modernisation and economic growth.

The QNV initiative began in 2006 in response to the need for greater policy integration for effective development. It was based on the State's permanent constitution, as well as a stakeholder engagement process between 2005 and 2007. The guiding principles for the QNV are based on human, social, economic and environmental development.

In June 2008 His Highness The Emir, Sheikh Hamad bin Khalifa Al-Thani, approved the Qatar National Vision 2030.

=== Qatar National Development Strategy (NDS) ===
The National Development Strategy (NDS) (Arabic:الإستراتيجية التنموية الوطنية) will provide a medium-term framework to move the state towards the realisation of the Vision. In other words, the Vision provides a foundation for the formulation of a National Development Strategy. GSDP will coordinate the National Development Strategy process with the higher authorities and in full partnership with stakeholders from civil society, and the private and public sectors.
