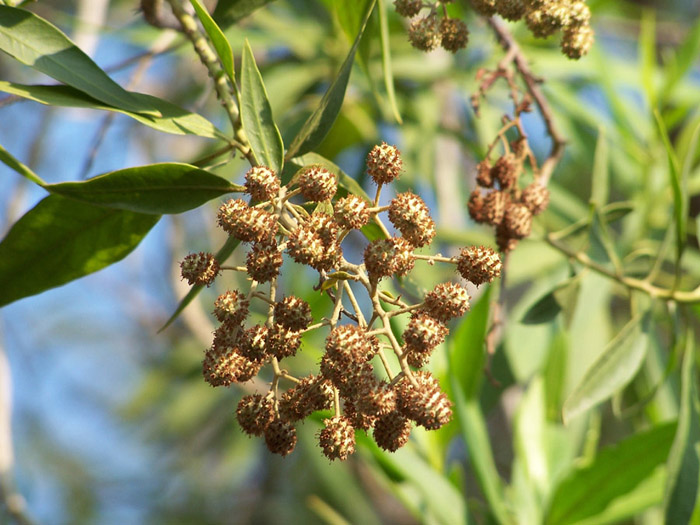
- Conocarpus lancifolius fruit

Conservation status
- Near Threatened (IUCN 2.3)

Scientific classification
- Kingdom: Plantae
- Clade: Tracheophytes
- Clade: Angiosperms
- Clade: Eudicots
- Clade: Rosids
- Order: Myrtales
- Family: Combretaceae
- Genus: Conocarpus
- Species: C. lancifolius

Binomial name
- Conocarpus lancifolius Engl.

Synonyms
- Conocarpus niloticus Delile ex Steud.

= Conocarpus lancifolius =

Species of flowering plant

Conocarpus lancifolius, one of two species in the genus Conocarpus, is a tree in the family Combretaceae native to coastal and riverine areas of Somalia, Djibouti, and Yemen. It is found throughout the Horn of Africa, the Arabian Peninsula, and South Asia.

The tree has no common name in English. In Somali, it is called qalab or dhamas; in Arabic, the name is damas. It is also commonly found in residential compounds in Dubai.

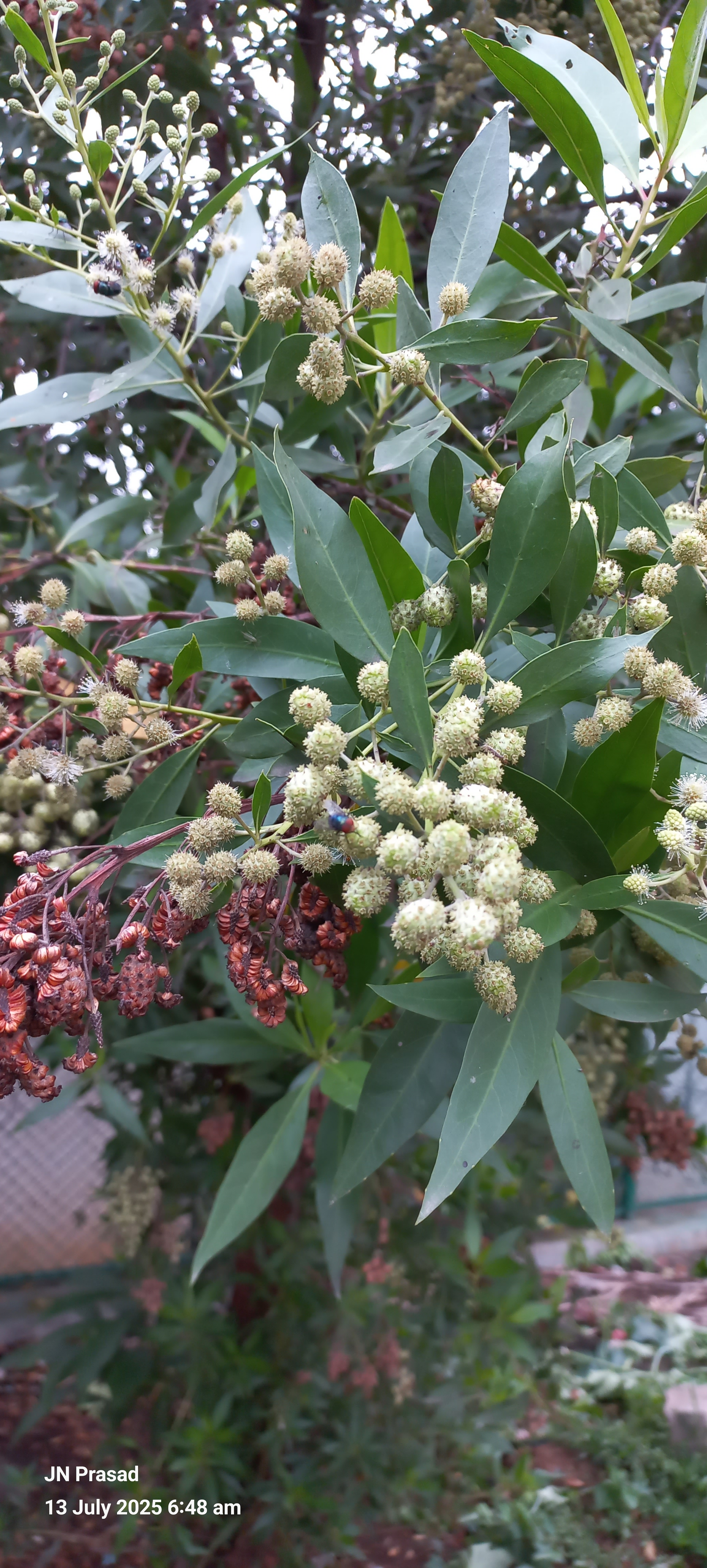
Conocarpus lancifolius tree with flowers and fruits

== Uses ==
The tree's wood is dense and suitable for charcoal. Goats use the young trees and shoots as fodder, although the leaves contain tannin. Because of its high salt tolerance and relative drought tolerance, the tree is sometimes planted as a pioneer species in reafforestation projects in its native habitat. The tree has a symmetrical growth habit and can easily be shaped into a variety of different forms. It can be shaped into short and tall hedges, and is effective for creating a visual or a noise barrier. With suitable plant spacing it can also be grown as a hardy single-stemmed tree which is good for shade. The tree has been extensively used in Karachi for landscaping along roads and by homeowners as a tall hedging tree for screening purposes. The tree thrives exceptionally well in the hot and dry climate of the city. The leaves of conocarpus lancifolius have an antidiabetic effect.

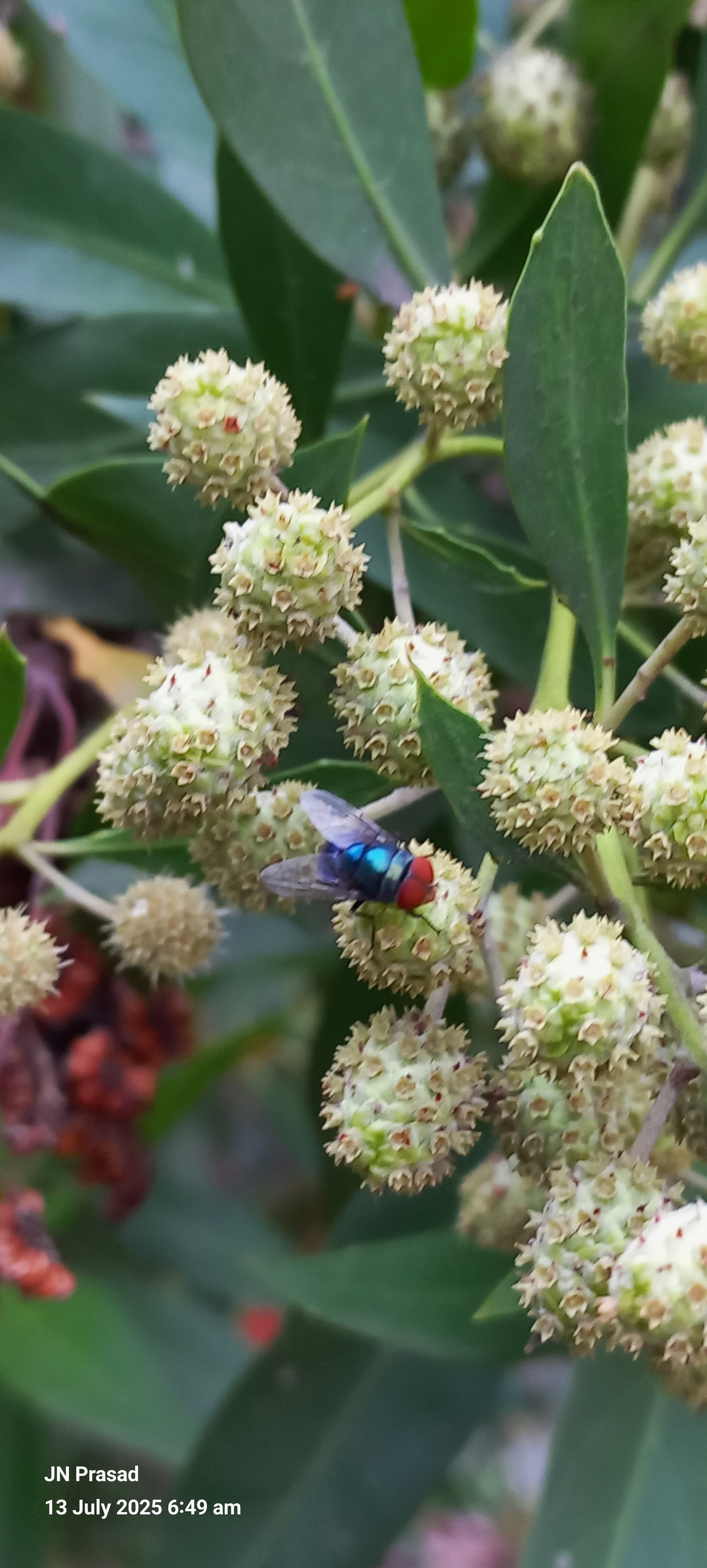
Conocarpus lancifolius flower
