= Qatar National Vision 2030 =

Qatar development plan launched in 2008

- رؤية قطر الوطنية 2030; Ru'iyat Al-Qatar Al-Watani 2030

Agency overview
- Formed: October 2008
- Jurisdiction: Government of Qatar
- Status: In Progress
- Agency executives: Tamim bin Hamad Al Thani, Emir of Qatar; Mohammed bin Abdulrahman bin Jassim Al Thani, Prime Minister of Qatar
- Website: https://www.gco.gov.qa/en/about-qatar/national-vision2030/

Qatar National Vision 2030 (Arabic: رؤية قطر الوطنية 2030; abbreviated as QNV 2030) is a development plan launched in October 2008 by the General Secretariat for Development Planning in the State of Qatar. The aim of QNV 2030 is to "transform Qatar into an advanced society capable of achieving sustainable development" by 2030. The plan's development goals are divided into four central pillars: economic, social, human, and environmental development. The government seeks to meet development goals by developing a strong bureaucratic framework and implementing strategies to address the challenges presented in human development reports.

== Development history ==
Qatar National Vision 2030's strategies are devised to address the challenges presented in previous human development reports published by the General Secretariat for Development Planning. The first human development report was compiled in 2006; it highlighted the potential challenges and downfalls that could beset the country if left unabated. The challenges ranged from a long-term demographic imbalance to a loss of cultural heritage. This report would consequently serve as the foundation of the National Development Strategy 2010–2015.

In July 2008, the Qatari government published a formal outline of QNV 2030. The General Secretariat for Development Planning announced the same month that they would issue another human development report. QNV 2030 was officially launched in October 2008. A second human development report was published in July 2009, and a third in 2012, the latter focusing on the youth population of the country.

== Development pillars ==
QNV 2030 partitions each set of challenges and solutions into one of the following four categories of development, which are known as the 'four pillars': economic, social, human, or environmental.

=== Economic development ===
QNV 2030's economic development strategy consists of ensuring efficient management of the national economy, taking a responsible approach towards natural resource management and working to develop a knowledge-based economy. Qatar's large expatriate population is considered an obstacle to economic development, as it creates a dependency on non nationals.

=== Social development ===
Qatar aims to achieve social development on a national scale by encouraging the adoption of Islamic philosophy and humanitarian values. The government also implements social programs to create a sense of community. Other initiatives taken by the government include promoting sports as a physical activity, fostering the country's cultural heritage, and encouraging family cohesion. Rapid population expansion is seen as a threat to social development due to Qatar's infrastructure not being developed enough to meet the rising demands. According to an article from The Worldfolio, a Singapore news organization, Qatar launched and completed significant infrastructure development as part of its 2030 vision. The developments featured new rail lines, a brand-new international airport and port, cutting-edge motorways, new hotels, and other travel and visitor amenities. In addition, the development included airport terminals with 41 unrestricted contact gates and a capacity for 30 million passengers yearly. The airport's annual passenger volume increased to 53 million by 2020 after several expansions, including the construction of a connection to the new Doha Metro and the addition of new check-in desks, lounges, restaurants, and boarding gates, extended the passenger terminal.

On the international level, the country seeks to forge stronger bilateral ties and assume a more active role in regional politics.

=== Human development ===
In order to foster a healthy and capable national workforce, the QNV 2030 prioritizes human development. Improved education and health care, and increased cultural awareness and employment opportunities for nationals are the cornerstones of the vision's human development strategy. A large emphasis is placed on the youth population in this regard. The low rate of Qataris joining the workforce is outlined as a major challenge to human development.

=== Environmental development ===
The vision outlines several distinct challenges facing Qatar's environment, which include a rapidly growing population, increased air pollution, and damage to natural habitats. One method previously employed by Qatar to address environmental issues was acquiring more advanced technology. Government reports claim that flaring intensity volumes per energy produced were nearly cut in half from 2008 to 2012 due to the adoption of new technology. Other strategies used to further environmental development include conducting environmental awareness campaigns and promoting sustainable urban growth.

== Initiatives ==
=== Qatarization ===
Qatarization is a governmental initiative devised to increase the number of Qatari citizens employed in public and private sectors. The target set by the government is 50% of the workforce in the Industry and Energy sector. Qatarization is crucial to the human development pillar as it contributes towards the employment of Qatari citizens, one of the pillar's primary goals. As a result, the government has sought to accelerate its implementation since launching QNV 2030.

== National Development Strategy 2011–2016 ==
The National Development Strategy 2011–2016 (NDS 2011–2016) was prepared as a supplementary development plan to QNV 2030 in March 2011. It outlines development strategies to be employed by government ministries in sixteen different sectors from 2011 to 2016 in order to ensure that they are working towards QNV 2030 in an efficient manner.
