= Education in Qatar =

Supreme Education Council
- Minister of Education: Buthaina Bint Ali Al Jabr Al Nuaimi

National education budget (2012)
- Budget: QR20.6bn

General details
- Primary languages: Arabic, English

Literacy (2015)
- Total: 96.6%
- Male: 96.7%
- Female: 96.2%

Enrollment
- Total: 280,041
- Primary: 68,255
- Secondary: 65,182
- Post secondary: 146,604

The education system in Qatar is jointly directed and controlled by the Supreme Education Council (SEC) and the Ministry of Education and Higher Education (MOEHE) at all levels. The SEC is responsible for overseeing independent schools, whereas the MOE is responsible for providing support to private schools. Formal schooling officially began in 1956. Primary schooling is obligatory for every child and is free in public schools.

Education in Qatar is very diverse, with several schools representing a variety of international curriculum systems. There are approximately 338 international schools in the country. Several prestigious universities from around the world have satellite campuses in the country in Education City and within the suburbs of the capital Doha.

== Education system ==
In 2001, Qatar hired the RAND Corporation to analyse and reform its K–12 education system due to uncertainties over the quality of the pre-existent system. At the time RAND's study was conducted, over 100,000 students were served by the Qatari education system; two-thirds of whom attended government-operated schools. RAND also proposed numerous reforms to the system to the Qatari government, with an emphasis on improving the curricula.

As a response to the RAND study, the Supreme Education Council launched the Education for a New Era (EFNE) initiative in 2001 and introduced nationwide policy reforms. One of the cardinal objectives of the EFNE was to adopt a Western education system for its preschool system. The SEC also aimed to increase overall enrollment in preschools with this initiative. In 2005, the SEC raised curriculum standards in Arabic, mathematics, and sciences for all grades. A large number of independent schools were also opened shortly after. Twelve independent schools opened in 2004, twenty-one in 2005 and thirteen in 2006.

An assessment test published in 2008 revealed that only a small portion of students were able to meet the new curriculum standards. Approximately 10% met the standards in English, 5% in Arabic and less than 1% met the standards in mathematics and sciences. A 2015 study conducted by the OECD ranked Qatar in the bottom 10 of its educational index.

Education was an integral part of the Qatar National Development Strategy 2011–2016. Furthermore, the Qatar National Vision 2030 sets a number of objectives for the country's education system. Qatar's government is promoting education so that it can solidify its national identity, promote morals and social values within its population, and diversify its economy away from hydrocarbons.

In 2021 Qatar was one of the first in groups of IT Technology sharetesting to emphasize and use debate methods with Textbook Style performances over its media platform directly into homes. It was hoped using the new technology leadership for putting it out there would inspire newer forms of radical training and help pressure improvements. Qatar in 2021 signaled it would stop the practice immediately after its first debate ended with a complete withdraw after it was entered into records.

== History ==
=== Islamic education ===
Prior to the 20th century, Qatari society did not place any specific emphasis on formal education. This was common in traditional Bedouin culture. Rather, Quranic education was highly valued in urban society, and to a lesser extent, rural society. Most children living in urban settlements were taught how to memorize, understand and read the Quran. This type of education was typically completed by the age of 10, whereupon the child's family would celebrate al khatma, or the end of memorizing the Quran. By the 18th century, Zubarah, the most important town in the peninsula, had developed into a center of Islamic education.

Islamic schools were divided into three categories known as mosques, kuttabs and madrasas. Mahmud Shukri Al-Alusi, an Islamic scholar, stated that between 1878 and 1913, there were around 20 kuttabs, 30 madrasahs and 400 mosques in the al-Hasa region, which included Qatar.

Sheikh Abdullah was interested in education, which led to the opening of Al-Athria school in 1913. It was closed later in 1926.

Mosques, in addition to serving as places of prayer, were also regarded as educational facilities as they provided Muslims with religious instruction and advice.

Kuttabs, which were also known as mutta or muttawa, were split into two sub-sections. The first type of kuttab taught only the Quran and basic religious principles and were very wide spread in both rural and urban areas. Children of both sexes could attend them, although they were gender segregated. Male children were taught in public areas or mosques, whereas females were taught privately in houses. The other variation of kuttab taught reading, writing and arithmetic in addition to the Quran. They were found only in large urban settlements, such as Doha, and were attended by children of wealthy families. There were several limitations on kuttabs, many of stemmed from the lack of qualifications of the instructors who staffed them.

Madrasas were advanced educational institutes which taught Islamic sciences and Arabic literature. They were located primarily in urban settlements. The country's most reputable madrasa in the early 20th century, Al-Madrasa al-Sheikh Muhammad Abdulaziz Al-Ma'na, was established in 1918 by a Bahraini sheikh. Its staff was composed of many highly educated instructors. The syllabus had an emphasis on Arabic literature and the Arabic language. There was no fixed number of years for a student to graduate. The madrasa produced some of the country's most highly skilled individuals, including a number of poets and government officials. It was closed in 1938.

=== Pre-modern and modern education ===
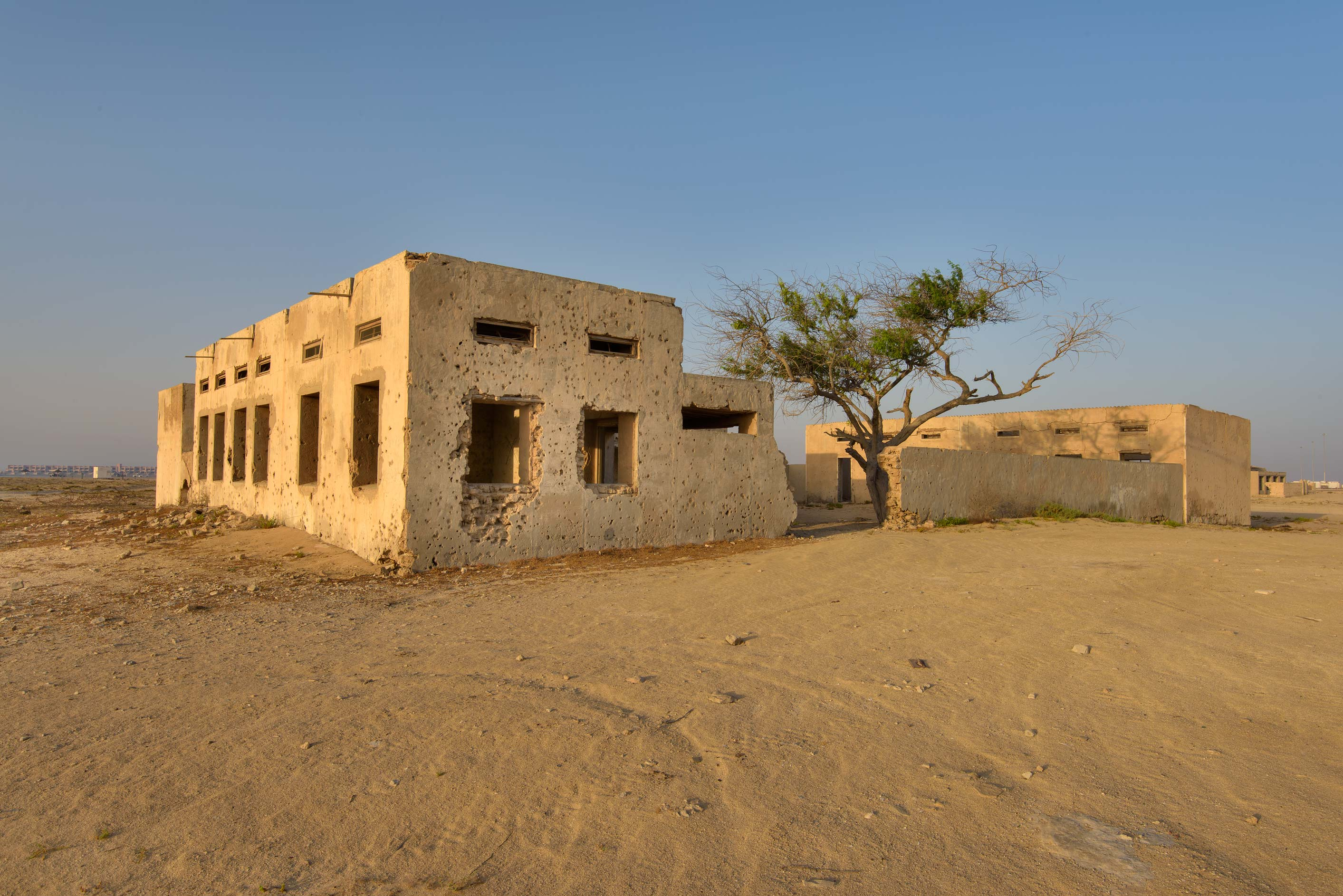
A ruined school building in Al Ghariyah dating to 1957

In 1949, the country's first formal school was established in Doha by the emir of Qatar under the name Islah al-Mohammadiyeh. It was staffed by one teacher and had 50 students. It experienced rapid development in its initial years, and by 1950–51, it was estimated to have accommodated 240 students and 6 teachers. The syllabus encompassed a broad range of topics, including religious education, geography, English, arithmetic and grammar. It imported its textbooks from Egypt. The city's second school was established in 1954.

Soon after the establishment of the country's first school in Doha, schools began their expansion into other settlements. A semi-primary school was established in Al Khor in 1952, and the first school in Ar Ru'ays was founded in 1954, raising the number of schools to four. Overall, there were 560 students and 26 teachers in 1954. The first formal girls' school opened its doors in the 1950s in Doha and the first female teacher and Principal was Amina Mahmoud Al-Jaidah.

In 1956, the Ministry of Education was founded, marking the beginning of several educational initiatives on a national scale. Seventeen primary schools were established that year, and accommodated 1,333 students and 80 teachers. In 1957, girls' schools were integrated into the national educational programme. That year, two girls' schools accommodating 451 students and 14 female teachers were formed. Girls' education grew at a rapid rate over the following years, until 1975–76 when the number of girls' schools equaled the number of boys' schools at 65 each.

A policy instated by the Ministry of Education during the 1950s limited the number of schools in order to balance the student-to-teacher ratio. Additionally, they provided teachers with numerous incentives, such as furnished accommodation and annual round-trip tickets.

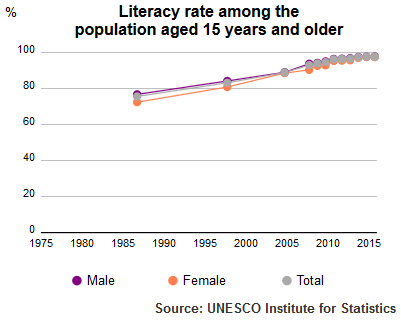
UNESCO Institute for Statistics Literacy Rate Qatar population plus 15 1985–2015

The development of the school system witnessed the establishment of nine schools in rural villages in 1957. The villages included Umm Salal, Simaisma, Abu Dhalouf, Al Ghariyah, and Al Khuwayr. There were approximately 369 students and 14 teachers in village schools that year. The government invested heavily in rural schools into the 1960s. By 1965, there was a total of 54 schools in villages, with 37 being exclusive to boys and 17 being exclusive to girls. This was partly a result of Qatari tribes exerting pressure on the government to establish schools in their villages in order to avoid the need for their children to attend schools in neighboring villages. However, this initiative was halted as a result of large-scale domestic emigration to Doha in the following years. There were 70 schools in 1969. In the 1970s, the government initiated a policy of re-locating village inhabitants to larger nearby settlements where they then established co-educational primary and secondary schools.

It was reported by the Private Education Department of the Ministry of Education that in 1985, there were 71 private schools in Qatar with 16-17,000 students, mainly reflecting the growing need for foreign-language educational institutes by the expatriate community.

There were four major school administrative zones by the early 1990s: Al Shamal (north Qatar), Doha, Al Khor (north-east Qatar), and Dukhan (west Qatar). The number of students in Qatar in 1996 was approximately 51,000, with 35,000 being primary students and 16,000 being secondary students. There were 8,000 university students.

== Education authorities ==
Control of education is currently shared between the Ministry of Education and the Supreme Education council. Funding to the Ministry of Education has been reduced and many schools have been transferred to the Supreme Education Council.

=== Supreme Education Council ===
Supreme Education Council building

Supreme Education Council (SEC) was created by decree number 37 in the year 2002. From 2006 onward, the council directs and controls the education system at all levels from pre-school through university. The SEC directs three educational institutes:

- The Education Institute, which directly oversees and semi-independent schools and develops curriculum standards.
- The Evaluation Institute, which conducts national assessments of student learning of independent K–12 schools and is responsible for licensing teachers.
- The Higher Education Institute, which assists students in applying for colleges.

=== Ministry of Education (Supreme Education Council) ===
Formed in 1956, the Ministry of Education currently supports private schools with educational facility inspections, health services, and electricity and water. Its personnel were consolidated into Supreme Education Council in 2009.

=== The Qatar Foundation for Education, Science and Community Development ===
Qatar Foundation for Education, Science and Community Development is a private, chartered, non-profit organization in the state of Qatar, founded in 1995. Under Qatar Foundation's umbrella are Education City, which began construction in 2000 and which comprises several foreign universities, academic and training programs, and the Qatar Science & Technology Park.

Qatar Foundation launched the World Innovation Summit for Education (WISE), an annual global forum that brings together education stakeholders, opinion leaders and decision makers from all over the world to discuss educational issues.

== International education institutions ==
=== Schools ===
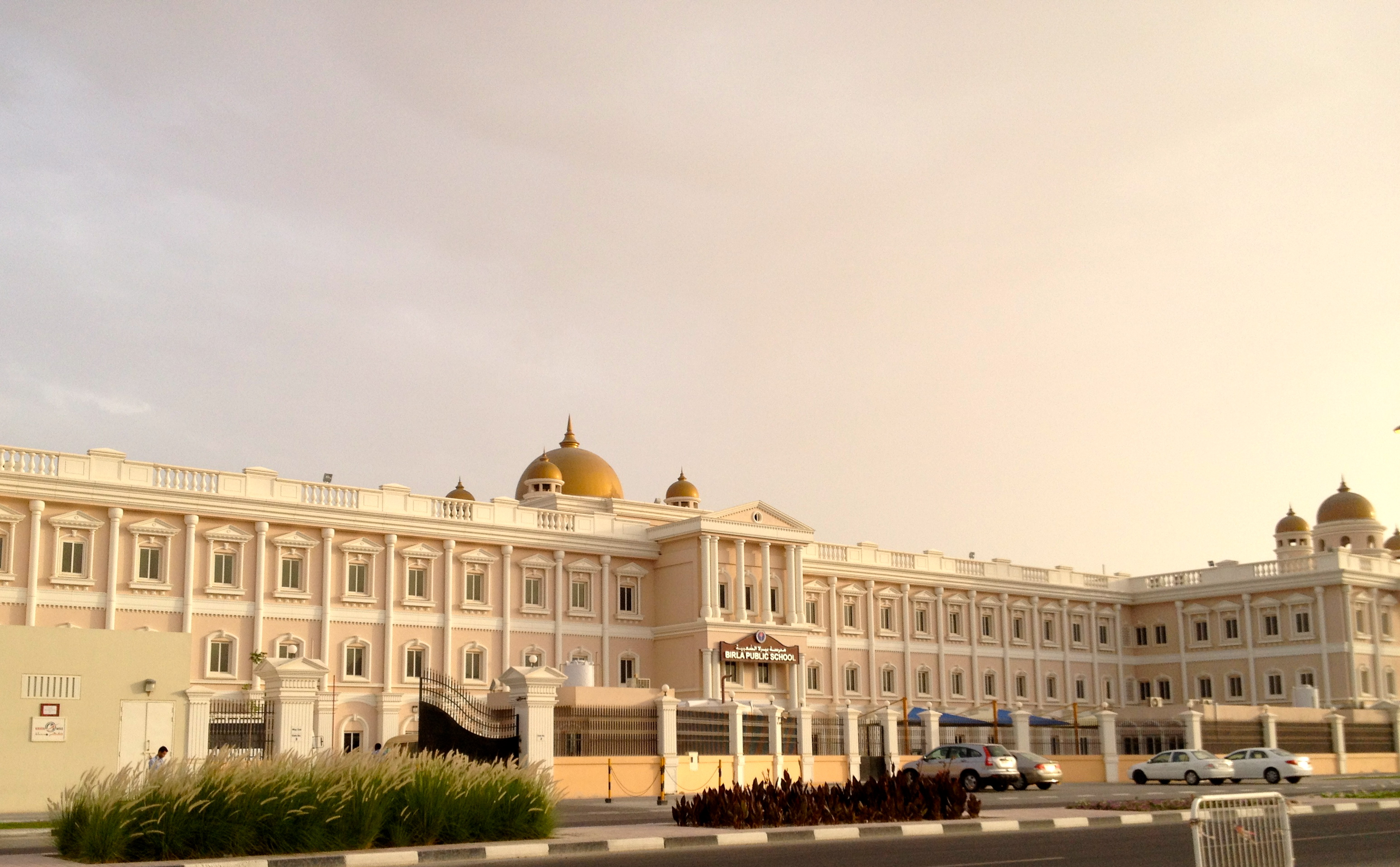
Birla Public School in Qatar

There are a large number of private and international schools. Most expatriates and some Qataris choose to send their children to these schools. These schools (and curricula) include Qatar Academy (IB World School), Doha College (UK curriculum), American School of Doha, The Gulf English School (UK / IB curriculum), Doha Academy, Doha English Speaking School (UK primary curriculum), The International School of Choueifat, The Cambridge School, Dukhan English School, Park House English School, Compass International School, Qatar International School (UK Curriculum for England), MES Indian School and Ideal Indian School (CBSE), English Modern School, Al Khor International School, Philippine School Doha, Pearling Season International School, Stafford Sri Lankan School Doha, Middle East International School, Sherborne Qatar (UK curriculum) and Mesaieed International School.

The Vision International School in Al Wakrah will offer an American curriculum in grades PreK–12. It opened in September 2014.

As of January 2015, the International Schools Consultancy (ISC) listed Qatar as having 147 international schools. ISC defines an 'international school' in the following terms "ISC includes an international school if the school delivers a curriculum to any combination of pre-school, primary or secondary students, wholly or partly in English outside an English-speaking country, or if a school in a country where English is one of the official languages, offers an English-medium curriculum other than the country's national curriculum and is international in its orientation." This definition is used by publications including The Economist.

Educational Needs of Large Expatriate Work Force in Qatar

Expatriate workers have been playing a significant role in Qatar since the 1940s, initially arriving from Egypt, Palestine, Iran and Pakistan, with later waves from India and Bangladesh in the 1960s and 1970s, and further arrivals from the Philippines, Nepal and Sri Lanka in the 1990s. To meet the needs of Non-Arabic-speaking expatriate children, community-run schools began to be established. For example, the Pakistani community founded the Pak Shama School in 1964 in Old Doha (off Al-Asmakh Street), under affiliation with the Lahore Educational Board. Three years later, in 1967, the Pakistani community opened a second school, which in 1985 was renamed the Pakistan Education Center (PEC), with school land being provided in the Abu Hamour district of Doha as a gift from the then-ruler, Sheikh Khalifa bin Hamad Al Thani. Today, numerous expatriate communities in Qatar operate their own schools with distinct curricula; though these schools continue to function under the regulatory guidelines of the Ministry of Education and Higher Education (previously the SEC).

Despite the establishment of numerous community and expatriate schools, Qatar’s rapid population growth has placed significant pressure on educational infrastructure. Many expatriate-oriented schools face issues of overcrowding and long waiting lists due to limited capacity relative to demand. Disparities have also emerged between the resources and quality of education available to Qatari nationals and those provided to expatriate children, contributing to a two-tiered educational landscape. Reports indicate that without expensive private schools and tutors, which are unaffordable for most expatriate worker parents, their children learn in schools with limited resources, poorly paid teachers and crowded classrooms, which limits their future prospects for quality higher education and careers. Reports from the 2010s have noted that a significant proportion of teachers in expatriate schools lack formal qualifications or access to professional development, affecting instructional quality, and an article from more than a decade later reported that educators "of different nationalities", and especially in expatriate settings, face a lack of adequate and equitable professional development opportunities. The diversity of languages, curricula, and cultural expectations among expatriate communities further complicates school administration and curriculum regulation, as institutions must reconcile home-country educational standards with Qatar’s national oversight framework.

=== Universities ===
Entrance to Carnegie Mellon University in Education City

The first university established in the country was Qatar University, founded as a teachers' college in 1973. It currently has eight colleges, including Education, Business and Economics, Arts and Sciences, Engineering, Sharia, Pharmacy, Law, and Medicine. Several universities from other countries have opened satellite campuses in the country. For example, some American universities have campuses at Education City. These include Cornell University, Weill Medical College, Carnegie Mellon University, Georgetown University, Virginia Commonwealth University, Northwestern University in Qatar and Texas A&M University. Universities from Canada include College of the North Atlantic-Qatar and the University of Calgary-Qatar. HEC Paris in Qatar was the first European partner to join Education City. University College London was the first British university to have opened a campus in Qatar although the campus closed in 2020. A second British university, the University of Aberdeen opened a branch in Doha in 2017. On top of that, Qatar Faculty of Islamic Studies is the graduate school and international center of excellence in Islamic Studies that is under the umbrella of Hamad Bin Khalifa University and attached to Qatar Foundation.

== Educational initiatives ==
The Qatari government has taken a unique approach to education through AL-Bairaq, an outreach program targeting high school students which focuses on a curriculum that is based on STEM fields. The idea behind AL-Bairaq is to offer high school students the opportunity to connect with the research environment in the Center for Advanced Materials (CAM) at Qatar University.

In 2009, the government launched the World Innovation Summit for Education (WISE), a global forum that brings together education stakeholders, opinion leaders and decision makers from all over the world to discuss educational issues. The first edition was held in Doha in November 2009. WISE has been involved in fundraising efforts for Haiti in an attempt to help rebuild the country's education system which suffered as a result of the 2010 Haiti earthquake. Additionally, WISE has created a Nobel-equivalent prize for education, with a $500,000 award for its recipient.

== Controversies ==
A 2026 report by The Sunday Telegraph states that several British private schools operating in Qatar, including Sherborne School, King's College Taunton, and Royal Grammar School Guildford, are required to use state-approved Qatari textbooks that reportedly omit or distort key historical and cultural topics. For example, 2025 history materials reportedly exclude the Holocaust when covering Nazi Germany, and instead reference Mein Kampf while only vaguely mentioning Adolf Hitler's "racist ideas." Additionally, one Islamic textbook describes Jews as "evil" for their rejection of Islam during its rise in the 7th century. Another Islamic education text reportedly teaches that Palestine is an "Arab and Islamic land" that should not be conceded in any part, encourages efforts toward its "liberation," and calls on students to oppose normalization of relations with Israel. These findings prompted condemnation from groups such as the Association of Jewish Refugees, which called the material "morally indefensible" and an "insult" to Holocaust survivors. The schools stated that they follow British curricula, but must comply with local laws mandating instruction aligned with Qatari national and religious values.

== See also ==
- Education in the Arab World
- Higher education in the Arab world

== Bibliography ==
- Abu Saud, Abeer (1984). Qatari Women: Past and Present. Longman Group. ISBN 978-0-582-78372-0.
- Abdulla Juma Kobaisi (1979). "The Development of Education in Qatar, 1950–1970" (PDF). Durham University.
- Zahlan, Rosemarie Said (1979). The creation of Qatar (print ed.). Barnes & Noble Books. ISBN 978-0-06-497965-8.
