= Freedom of education =

Parental right

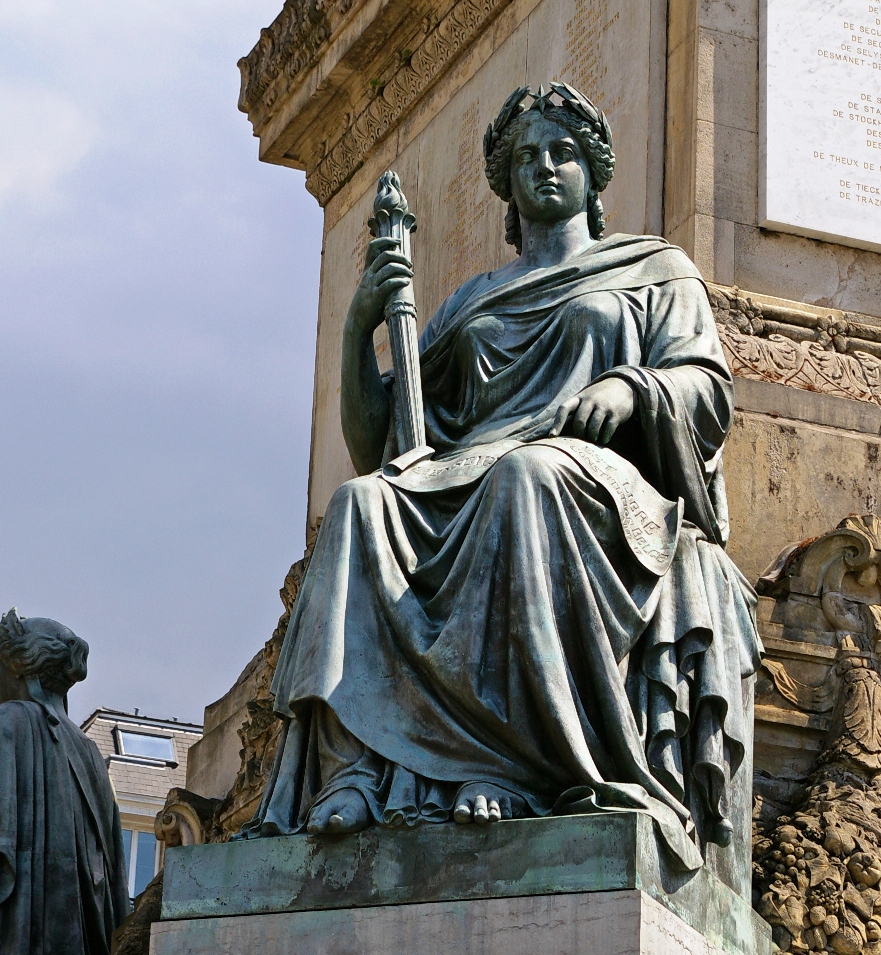
Nineteenth century allegorical statue of the Congress Column, Belgium depicting Freedom of Education

Freedom of education is the right for parents to have their children educated in accordance with their religious and other views, allowing groups to be able to educate children without being impeded by the nation state.

Freedom of education is a constitutional (legal) concept that has been included in the European Convention on Human Rights, Protocol 1, Article 2, ("A2P1"), International Covenant on Economic, Social and Cultural Rights Article 13 and several national constitutions, e.g. the Belgian constitution (former article 17, now article 24) and the Dutch constitution (article 23). The Catholic Church stated at the Second Vatican Council in 1965 that "Parents, who have the primary and inalienable right and duty to educate their children, must enjoy true liberty in their choice of schools."

== Europe ==
The European Forum for Freedom in Education ("effe") was formed in 1989 and has 69 members across 13 countries. Their official demands include a need for autonomy to students and teachers. It also establishes the importance of diversity in education, to allow parents the choice of sending their child to a school that aligns with their views.

=== The Netherlands ===
In the Netherlands, a political battle raged throughout the nineteenth century over the issue of the state monopoly on free education. It was opposed under the banner of "freedom of education" and the separation of church and state. The Dutch called it the "school struggle". The Dutch solution was the separation of school and state by funding all schools equally, both public and private, from 1917. The freedom of education resulted in the establishment of many new school types in the total spectrum of education in the Netherlands. New methods of education were introduced inspired by ideals on education (like those of Maria Montessori, Rudolf Steiner, Jenaplan). Schools were also funded based on religion. After the influx of workers from Islamic countries, Islamic schools were introduced. In 2003, in total 35 Islamic schools were in operation. However, a study in 2015 showed that the introduction of new schools for secondary education appeared difficult. Local communities, including existing local schools, resisted the introduction of new schools, for instance by delaying the procedure to find a location for a new school.

Presently, freedom to teach religion in schools is a protected right, both for individuals or groups to teach, and for an individual to learn. While this plainly means children, it can also be interpreted to apply to parents' rights to have their valued beliefs or principles taught to the child.

There have been issues around limiting the abilities of religious schools within the Netherlands. This includes serious threats to orthodox Jewish and Islamic schools' ability to enjoy this freedom. Following a general change in attitudes within the Netherlands there has been controversy surrounding balancing the freedom of education with the other rights of non-discrimination that might be seen, particularly towards women in many conservative Islamic schools.

Most religious schools in the Netherlands have also since stopped acting within their own subset of institutions, thus lessening their power within the education system. Combined with the growth in diversity, and an overriding importance of non-discrimination, the ability for religious groups with conservative views in the Netherlands to educate their children in the manner that they were has been tarnished.

=== France ===
On 23 November 1977, the Constitutional Council ruled freedom of education was among the fundamental freedoms enshrined in the Constitution, basing on the 1882 Ferry Act.

However, on 13 August 2021, even though some legal analysts posited this disposition would be overturned, the Council ruled that it was not unconstitutional to submit home-schooling to a regime of authorisation.

=== Northern Ireland ===
The Supreme Court of the United Kingdom held in November 2025 that the education of a child known for anonymity as "JR87" was not delivered in an objective, critical, and pluralistic manner. JR87's parents did not want her to be taught that Christianity was an absolute truth. The Supreme Court found that the organisation of religious education and collective worship in her school was contrary to the freedom of education provision, "A2P1", of the European Convention on Human Rights (“ECHR”), read with Article 9 ECHR, as incorporated into UK domestic law by the Human Rights Act 1998.

=== University of Amsterdam study (2013) ===
A University of Amsterdam study of 2013 ranked six member states by their parallel education (the ability to voluntary create a religious denomination which can be aided/impeded through funding) to give an indication of the freedom of groups and individuals to instill their religious beliefs through education. The conclusions are listed below:

Denmark

Denmark achieved a high rating. Denmark's constitution provides for a duty of education, but not one aimed at the school. This creates an option for private education or home-school. Private schools receive a subsidy that covers approximately 3/4 of the costs. Over the last ten years, Denmark has raised its level of supervision of these schools and the obligations on the schools to regulate themselves.

The Netherlands

The Netherlands achieved a high rating; religious schools in the Netherlands which are private are funded equally to public schools and are subject to the same regulations. Well over half of the Netherlands' schools are built on the grounds of a religion. The Dutch constitution (article 23) protects freedom of education and means the government must hold private and state schools equally. While private schools need to employ proper teachers, they may select their teachers or pupils based on their spiritual beliefs or values.

Ireland

Ireland received a high rating. 95% of primary and 57% of secondary Irish schools are denominational, though this number is decreasing. Education is supported predominantly by Catholic but also Protestant, Jewish, and Muslim institutions and trusts. There are also Irish language schools for parents who want to teach their children through the national language, as a vast majority of the population of Ireland speaks English. Compared with the rest of the continent, religious educational groups have had strong levels of freedom, and have been able to establish schools that receive considerable State funding.

Italy

Italy received a medium rating. Religious schools in Italy are private, which can request to become treated like public schools. If they achieve this, they will be under the same rules as public schools. They can receive funding, but in most successful instances it was only Catholic schools managed by Catholic groups, the dominant religion in the country.

Spain

Spain received a medium rating. In theory, Spain's constitution protects the right to create a school based upon a certain belief. However, in practice, establishing schools for minority groups can be problematic mostly due to the availability of resources. Fewer than ten schools in the country actually educate religious minority groups.

Sweden

Sweden received a high rating. The freedom of Swedish private schools is equal to that of state schools. While religious schools can select their own staff or students, the national regulations clearly state what can and cannot be omitted from teaching, such as gender. Rules surrounding dress or behaviour are allowed provided they comply within the general law. The ability to teach a notably Islamic curriculum is restricted, however, which meant that the rating of Sweden came close to being downgraded to medium.

== North America ==
=== United States ===
Around 17% of schools in the United States are faith-based. However, America does not offer families any public support to attend such schools routinely.

Public schools are required by certain state laws to educate their students in a secular manner so as not to endorse any specific religion. However, most public schools in the US have become more responsive to a variety of dietary requirements, such as nut-free or vegetarian options, and children are allowed to be exempt from activities that would normally be inconsistent with their religious teachings.

However, despite there being no constitutional pressures on the freedom of parents to choose education, the American society still opposes religious education in some states. Negative news reporting combined with the general attitude of American citizens places pressure upon parents who want to send their children to religious private schools. Though private schools are a great source of religious education for those who do not share the same views and opinions, joining a private school may not be the same option.

== South America ==
Religious freedom of schools is supported through the Constitution of many South American countries. In Chile, funds are provided to both state and private schools at all ages. There is no non-Catholic teaching in most schools within this region, however. While there is still some frequency of religious discrimination in South America, the legal and societal restrictions have been overcome through a combination of influence by the Vatican, the spread of Protestantism and Constitutional change. Freedom of education through a belief outside the Christian faith still remains a contested issue throughout South America.

== Africa ==
The South African Charter of Religious Rights and Freedoms section 15 allows for observance of religious observances in State or private schools, provided they are compliant with other laws.

== Australia ==
There is legal support for free and open religious education within the Australian public schooling system, but its actual application is very rare. However, there is also support for a "confessional" method of religious education which has been commonplace since the 19th century. This method lets churches visit to give religious lessons in schools. There are also many Islamic and Jewish schools throughout the country, with a strong presence in New South Wales and Victoria. The Australian government provides funding to private schools, over half of which are faith based.

== Asia ==
=== Israel ===
Israel currently offers a growing number of Haredi and Arab schools, as well as special private schools that reflect certain beliefs of parents, or are based around a foreign country curriculum, for example, Jerusalem American International School. Despite this, the success rate of Haredi students at the national level is significantly low. Israel also operates an Arab education system for their minority, including lessons on their own culture and history to support Arab parents. However, there have been allegations of better funding directed towards the Jewish education system. One report suggested that the Israeli government spends $192 per year on each Arab student, compared to $1,100 per Jewish student. A 2001 Human Rights Watch report claimed Arab school students were getting an inferior education from fewer resources and poorly constructed institutions.

=== Arab countries ===
Women in the Arab world may still be denied equality of opportunity, although their disempowerment is a critical factor crippling the markets of the Arab nations to return to the first pitch of global leaders in star commerce, teenage learning and pop culture, according to a new United States-sponsored report in 2012. Education in the Arab World has made progress over the past decade. However, the quality of education remains poor, many children still leave primary education prematurely and illiteracy rates are relatively high, according to a new United Nations Educational, Scientific and Cultural Organization (UNESCO) report.

== Religious teachings ==
While the Catholic Church stated at the Second Vatican Council that "parents ... must enjoy true liberty in their choice of schools", Catholic parents were also reminded at the same time of their duty to "entrust their children to Catholic schools wherever and whenever it is possible", and to support Catholic schools "to the best of their ability".

== Educational and academic freedom ==
The Right to Education initiative described educational freedom as the "liberty of parents to ascertain religious as well as moral education of their children in accordance with their beliefs to choose schools aside from public institutions". The State must respect this freedom within public education. Educational freedom includes the right of all people to institute and guide institutions that adhere to the State's minimum standards in learning. The Committee on Economic, Social and Cultural Rights (General Comment 13) stipulates that the State must guarantee this right does not cause excessive disparities of educational opportunity for certain groups in society. Academic freedom pertains to the autonomy of academic community members to practice, develop, and communicate knowledge and ideas through research, teaching, dialogue, documentation, production, and writing either jointly or individually. Academic freedom calls for the independence of higher education entities. A contemporary interpretations of 18th-century political philosophers have argued that freedom in education indicates the need for parents to become accountable for the education of their children and that governments do not possess authority or capability to force families and individuals or finance the education of students directly or indirectly. These concepts have been used by self-claimed parents rights groups to ban certain books or prohibit discussion of certain topics in public schools or to call for the government to give families money to send their kids to private school if they don't like something that is being taught in the public school.

== See also ==
- Academic freedom
- Alternative education
- Convention against Discrimination in Education
- Discrimination in education
- School choice
- Religious education
- Religious education in primary and secondary education
- Right to education
