= Amna Mahmoud Al-Jaidah =

- Born: 1913
- Died: 2000 (aged 86–87)
- Occupations: teacher, school principal
- Known for: Founder of the first school for girls in Qatar
- Children: two

Amna Mahmoud Al-Jaidah (1913–2000) was the first female teacher in Qatar. She opened the first school for girls in Qatar, becoming the first woman to lead a school in 1953. She is a key figure in developing Qatari education for girls.

== Life ==
Amna Mahmoud was born in 1913 in Doha, Qatar. Her mother was Nayela Bint Mohamed Darwish and her father was Mahmoud Youssef Al-Jaydah. Her father encouraged her to study as he believed that boys and girls required a good education. When she was seven she began the task of memorising chapters of the Quran at a school run by Sheikh Hamid Bin Ahmed Bin Mohamed. She was taught by a woman named Mariam. The children would learn for four hours in the morning and then after going home for lunch, a prayer and a siesta. They returned to the kuttab twice more each day and in three years she learned the Quran. This was unusual for a female of any age to be a hafiz, a person who had memorized the entire Quran.

Mahmoud began teaching when she was fourteen because she had done so well in learning the Quran. She taught women who were older than her including her sister and her aunt. The students had to come her home to be taught because it was forbidden for girls to go to another house without an escort.

For four years from the age of eighteen she was married and lived in Bahrain. Her husband was related to her father and she had two children before she returned. She had not taught in Bahrain, but it is likely that she saw that Bahrain had schools for girls. She persuaded her sister, who was still teaching, that she could help again at the kuttab. In 1938, when she was about 25, she moved the school to a nearby building as her reputation grew. Her kuttab accepted both boys and girls in the summer and in the winter.

They would have study sessions twice a day for five days each week with a very early session before sunrise on Fridays. Initially the students would be divided by gender with boys on one side of the room and girls on the other but in time they attended on different days. The parents of girls had to be persuaded that education was of value. Even then some only wanted their girls to be able to read the Quran, seeing no value in them learning to write. Qatar was behind the curve led by Kuwait and Bahrain for improving Arab education. In 1951 Qatar opened the Khalid Bin El Walid Boys School.

Her school became known as Amna Mahmoud's school and she began to teach not only the Quran, but also how to read and write. The popularity of the school grew. Around that time, the Qatari Minister of Education tried to raise the question of whether there could be a school for girls. Quran's Emir initially would not permit it. It is said that the Emir reconsidered after hearing others talking about the good work at Amna Mahmoud's school. Religious advice was taken and it was decided that girls could be educated.

In 1953, Amna Mahmoud's school came under the direction of the Qatari Ministry of Education. It was the first school for girls, and Amna Mahmoud was the first female teacher paid by the state. Her house was converted into a school and her male students were transferred to the boys' school. Some parents withdrew their daughters, but many other joined and another building had to be included. Two more women teachers were employed for what was named the Banat El Doha School (Daughters of Doha School) and Mahmoud was the country's first female Principal. This gave Mahmoud personal challenges, as the school was offering access to a better education than she had ever enjoyed. She had to study privately so she could keep up with the students’ ambitions.

More schools were created for girls and initially Mahmoud was the principal of a few of them. Many of her students became teachers and in the 1970s her school gained a library. She retired in 1976.

== Death and legacy ==
Mahmoud died in the year 2000. The building where she established her school, now named Umm Almo'mneen School, was closed in 2005. It became an arts centre. In 2019 it was re-opened as a design studio preserving architecture from when it was a school. Qatar Museums curate a small collection of objects from her school.

The Amina Mahmoud Al Jaida Primary Girls’ School in Doha is named for her. In 2018 the artist Iman al Saad staged an exhibition called "Words of Gold" using works from the Quran. Iman al Saad dedicated all the profits from the exhibition to charity as she had been inspired by her mother Amna Mahmoud Al-Jaidah.
