= Discrimination in education =

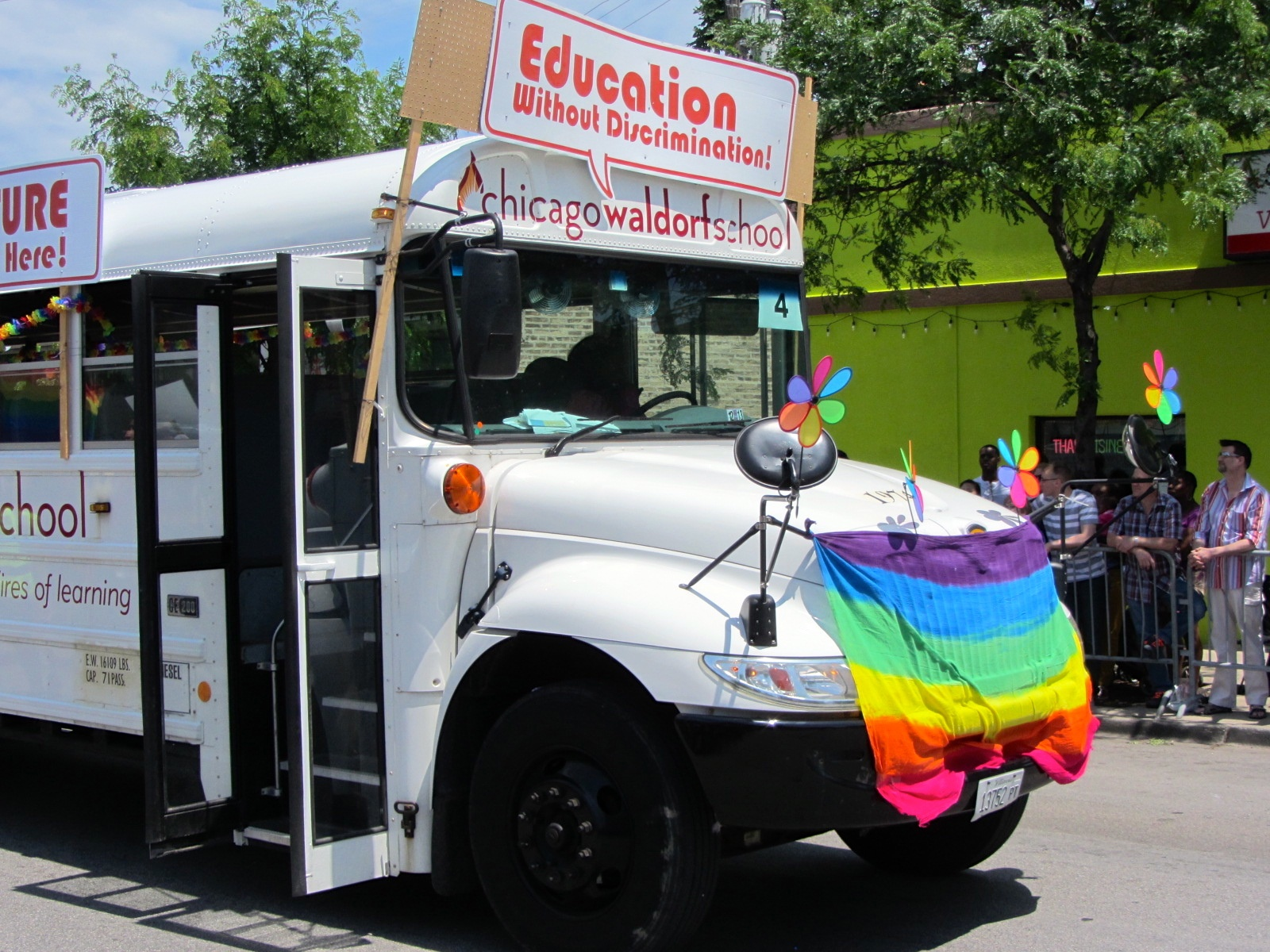
Bus with a pride flag and sign that reads "Education Without Discrimination"

Discrimination in education is the act of discriminating against people belonging to certain demographics in enjoying full right to education. It is a violation of human rights. Education discrimination can be on the basis of ethnicity, nationality, age, gender, race, economic condition, language spoken, caste, disability and religion.

The Convention against Discrimination in Education adopted by UNESCO on 14 December 1960 aims to combat discrimination and racial segregation in education. As of December 2020, 106 states were members of the convention.

== Teacher bias in grading ==
In several countries, teachers were shown to systematically give students different grades for an identical work, based on categories like ethnicity or gender. According to the Education Longitudinal Study, "teacher expectations [are] more predictive of college success than most major factors, including student motivation and student effort". Grading bias can be detected by comparing the outcome of exams where the teacher knows the student's characteristics with blind exams where the student is anonymous. This method may underestimate the bias since, for written exams, the handwriting style might still convey information about the student. According to the Experimental Evidence on Teachers' Racial Bias in Student Evaluation, "teachers rated a student's writing sample lower when it was randomly signaled to have a black author versus a white author. This study found that this bias was dependent on the teacher and their relationship and attitude towards race. Other studies apply the same method to cohorts spanning multiple years, to measure each teacher's individual biases. Alternatively, teacher's grading bias can be measured experimentally, by giving teachers a fabricated assignment where only the name (and thus gender and ethnicity) of the student differs.

=== Sexism ===
Multiple studies in various disciplines and countries found that teachers systematically give higher grades to girls and women. This bias is present at every level of education, in elementary school (United States), middle school (France, Norway, United Kingdom, United States) and high school (Czech Republic). Grading discrimination is also present in university admission exams: in the United States, the counselors who evaluate students for college admission favor women over men. In France, it was shown that in the admission exam for elite school École Normale Supérieure, juries were biased against men in male-dominated disciplines (such as mathematics, physics or philosophy) and biased against women in female-dominated ones (such as biology or literature). Similar results were obtained for teacher's accreditation exams at the end of university. Female teachers tend to have a stronger pro-female bias than male teachers.

Using individual teacher effects, Massachusetts Institute of Technology's Camille Terrier showed that teachers' bias affects male students' motivation and impairs their future progress. It can also significantly affect the students' career decisions. There is some evidence that students are aware of the unfair grading. For example, middle school boys tend to expect lower grades from female teachers.

=== Racism ===
According to a 2018 study from Germany, students from the Turkish ethnic minority are given lower grades than native Germans. A 2024 study in Germany on anonymously graded tests found lower grades by immigrants were caused by performance gaps, while non-anonymous teacher ratings showed discrimination against native Germans. Language difficulties were shown to not explain the observed disparities.

In 1999, National Union of Students (NUS) had called for the introduction of anonymous marking and claimed racial and sexual discrimination had impacted the results of students. NUS cited a study which showed "the marks awarded to black students at one London university were 4.2 per cent lower than those given to their white peers. And at a Welsh university, 42 per cent of men got first class or upper second degrees compared with 34 per cent of women. In Scotland, Asian students comprised 20 per cent of those on a particular course, but represented 80 per cent of those who had failed".

According to a 2015 US study, classroom discussion around race today is much less negative than one would find in the past. This article discusses a process called anti-bias curriculum. This advocates for classroom and parent discussion around issues of discrimination, privilege, oppression, and racism with young children. This allows room for children to develop skills with these topics.

A 2015 study showed that African American middle and high school students who heard messages from teachers about ignoring race felt less connected to others at school and held a more negative view of their academic abilities.

A 2017 UK study found that anonymous marking had a neligible impact in reducing performance differences between student populations from differing ethnic, sexual and socio-economic backgrounds.

A 2019 report by Universities UK found that student's race and ethnicity significantly affect their degree outcomes. According to this report from 2017–18, there was a 13% gap between the likelihood of white students and Black and Minority Ethnic (BAME) students graduating with a first or 2:1 degree classification.

== By country ==
=== Australia ===
Australia has had a history of racial discrimination against Indigenous Australians in many areas, including education. In 1966, Australia signed the Convention against Discrimination in Education. Each state now has comprehensive anti-discrimination laws that prohibit such discrimination. In 1992, Australia enacted the Disability Discrimination Act 1992 (Cwth) to outlaw discrimination against students with disabilities.

=== China ===
Although all people are entitled to nine years of compulsory education in China, there are reports showing that minorities including people with disabilities are discriminated against in basic education. An example of such discrimination that is reflected in the 2013 Human Rights Watch report is of children with attention-deficit/hyperactivity disorder (ADHD) and intellectual disability who were denied enrollment in nearby schools due to their disabilities. Their parents then had to travel long distances from home to find a place for their disabled children for basic education.

There are also policies for geographical allocation of available sits in higher education system which led to regional discrimination in the Higher Education Entrance Examination. In China every person has a place of origin in connection to his/her birthplace, and moving or resettlement to provinces/zones other than the ones of origin are subject to receive permits from the authorities. The students subject to regional discrimination are those who managed to have a better record in the relevant exams but are denied studying at top universities due to their place of origin.

=== Cuba ===
Cuba has a diverse and multicultural society and there is potentially an available arena for various forms of racial discrimination to grow. Some believe the Cuban educational system suffers from racial discrimination, especially against Afro-Cubans, but the existence of counterparts who believe otherwise can not be neglected.

In the 1960s and 1970s, when the sexual minority groups were sentenced to stay in rehabilitation camps, they automatically lost the opportunity for higher education and were bound to "re-education" by the state. In 2010, Fidel Castro acknowledged such discrimination during his rule, regretting that he did not pay enough attention to the "great injustice" suffered.

=== Islamic Republic of Iran ===
After the Islamic revolution, the new government focused on the Islamization of the country's educational system. Ruhollah Khomeini was in strong favor of single-sex schools and expressed it in his speech at the anniversary of the birth of Fatimah bint Muhammad, which soon became policy in the country. The political figure stated:

"As the religious leaders have influence and power in this country, they will not permit girls to study in the same school with boys. They will not permit women to teach at boys' schools. They will not permit men to teach at girls' schools. They will not allow corruption in this country."

The current constitution of Iran states in Article 4 that: "All civil, penal, financial, economic, administrative, cultural, military, political, and other laws and regulations must be based on Islamic criteria. This principle applies absolutely and generally to all articles of the Constitution as well as to all other laws and regulations" The cultural and religious embodiments of Androcentrism can be seen throughout the countries infrastructure and policies. For instance, Iran still considers household and childcare as women's primary responsibility, as shown through the difference in school criteria between the two sexes. In addition, Bahá'í students have been systematically expelled from Iranian universities on grounds of religion.

=== United States ===
The United States is not a signatory to the Convention against Discrimination in Education. The United States has always had institutional discrimination, with very high discrimination rates. Segregating schools is a way in which low income students may be isolated from higher income students, which causes them to receive a less effective education. Students living in lower income communities receive, on average, less investment in their education than students in higher income communities.

Slaves were prohibited from attending schools and many were not allowed to learn to read or receive an education. Various minorities were barred from most schools that admitted white students. Segregation was enforced by laws in U.S. states, primarily in the Southern United States, although segregation could also occur in informal systems or through social expectations and norms in other areas of the country. Segregation laws were met with resistance by Civil Rights activists and began to be challenged in 1954 by cases brought before the U.S. Supreme Court. Segregation continued longstanding exclusionary policies in much of the Southern United States (where most African Americans lived) after the Civil War. Jim Crow laws codified segregation. These laws were influenced by the history of slavery and discrimination in the US. Secondary schools for African Americans in the South were called training schools instead of high schools in order to appease racist whites and focused on vocational education. School integration in the United States took place at different times in different areas and often met resistance. After the ruling of Brown v. Board of Education, which banned segregated school laws, school segregation took de facto form.

School segregation declined rapidly during the late 1960s and early 1970s as the government became strict on schools' plans to combat segregation more effectively as a result of Green v. County School Board of New Kent County. Voluntary segregation by income appears to have increased since 1990. Racial segregation has either increased or stayed constant since 1990, depending on which definition of segregation is used. In general, definitions based on the amount of interaction between black and white students (exposure definitions) show increased racial segregation, while definitions based on the proportion of black and white students in different schools (unevenness definitions) show racial segregation remaining approximately constant.

== See also ==
- Academic bias
- English-language learner#Teacher biases and training
- Freedom of education
- Inclusion (education)
- Malala Yousafzai
- Psychological impact of discrimination on health
- Right to education
