= Filipinos in Qatar =

Total population
- ~260,000

Languages
- Languages of the Philippines, English and Arabic

Religion
- Roman Catholicism or other Christian denominations, Islam

Related ethnic groups
- Filipino people, Overseas Filipinos

Filipinos in Qatar are either migrants or descendants of the Philippines living in Qatar. Around 260,000 Filipinos live in Qatar, and frequently work in construction and service jobs. As of early 2017, Filipinos are estimated to be the fourth-largest group of foreign workers in Qatar, after Indians, Nepalis and Bangladeshis. With 56,277 Filipinos arriving between January and November 2008, Qatar is the third-largest destination of Overseas Filipino Workers (OFW's) in the Middle East after the United Arab Emirates and Saudi Arabia, and also the fourth-largest destination of OFW's worldwide. Despite this, and the removal of the Philippines from the pandemic-related travel-restriction "Red List" in August, 2022, Philippine nationals are unable to apply for Qatar tourist visas.

== Filipino workers ==
President Gloria Macapagal Arroyo said that Qatar was going to hire 37,000 more Filipinos to work on infrastructure projects in 2009, mostly in the areas of services, construction, and energy. The Qatar Minister of Labour also set aside 121,924 work permits "exclusively for Filipinos," also for 2009. About 22 major companies (and 27 in all), including engineering company Bechtel-Qatar, Royally owned transportation company Mowasalat and Lulu Hypermarkets. The Philippine Department of Labor and Employment also has a Philippine Overseas Labor Office (POLO) in Qatar.

== Filipino organisations ==
There are about 146 Filipino organisations in Qatar, ranging from the Philippine Basketball League Qatar to the Qatar Pinoy Riders. In March 2008, Hamad bin Khalifa, the emir of Qatar, allowed five Christian denominations to open churches. A Roman Catholic Church, with a Filipino priest and a predominantly Filipino congregation was among those that opened. In October 2008, ABS-CBN Broadcasting Corporation sponsored a Filipino cultural exposition in Doha that experienced an extremely high turnout of 13,000.

Encouraged and established by Philippine Embassy under the guidance of the former Honorable Ambassadors HE Crescente Relacion, the Filipino Community in Qatar is led by the following leaders, Jhin Tabuzo, Pastor Beda Robles, Jun Villena, Lyndon Magsino, Frank Jamandre, Fidel Escurel and many more.

== See also ==
- Philippines–Qatar relations
- Filipino diaspora
- Demographics of Qatar
- Philippine School Doha
