= Reservation (law) =

Aspect of international law

A reservation in international law is a caveat to a state's acceptance of a treaty. A reservation is defined by the 1969 Vienna Convention on the Law of Treaties (VCLT) as:

a unilateral statement, however phrased or named, made by a State, when signing, ratifying, accepting, approving or acceding to a treaty, whereby it purports to exclude or to modify the legal effect of certain provisions of the treaty in their application to that State. (Article 2 (1)(d))

In effect, a reservation allows the state to be a party to the treaty, while excluding the legal effect of that specific provision in the treaty to which it objects. States cannot take reservations after they have accepted the treaty; a reservation must be made at the time that the treaty affects the State. The Vienna Convention did not create the concept of reservations but codified existing customary law. Thus even States that have not formally acceded to the Vienna Convention act as if they had. As reservations are defined under the Vienna Convention and interpretative declarations are not, the two are sometimes difficult to discern from each other. Unlike a reservation, a declaration is not meant to affect the State's legal obligations but is attached to State's consent to a treaty to explain or interpret what the State deems unclear.

== Procedure ==
The Articles 19–23 of the Vienna Convention details the procedures relating to reservations. To see if a reservation is valid the legality of the reservation test applies as described in article 19 of the Vienna Convention. According to this article a state may not formulate a reservation if:

1: The reservation is prohibited by the treaty. (e.g. the Supplementary Convention on the Abolition of Slavery, Convention against Discrimination in Education and Minamata Convention on Mercury)
2: The treaty provides that only specified reservations, which do not include the reservation in question, may be made.

This is often the case when during negotiations it becomes apparent that a certain provision in a treaty will not be agreed upon by all parties. Therefore, the possibility is given to parties not to agree with that provision but to agree with the treaty in general.

3: In cases not falling under (1) or (2), the reservation is incompatible with the object and purpose of the treaty.

Point 3 is called the compatibility test and is difficult to determine. It is not always clear what the object and purpose of the treaty is, especially when treaties are long and complex.

A reservation must be put into writing and then sent to either the depository of the treaty, in the case of a multilateral treaty, or directly to the other States party to the treaty.

A State may withdraw a reservation at any time. This requires written submission to the other signatory States.

=== Objections ===
When states make an objection to a reservation stating that it failed the legality test, there are three possible results, according to legal commentators:

1. The state which made the reservation is not bound by the treaty anymore. In other words, the state is no longer a party to this treaty.
2. The state which made the reservation is bound by the treaty including the parts on which it made the reservation.
3. The state which made the reservation is bound by the treaty, but not by the part on which it made the reservation.

There are many opponents to the second option who argue that this goes against the principle of state consent. States can only be bound by provisions they have consented to. Since they have made a reservation to a certain provision, they cannot be bound by it.

According to some commentators, what happens in practice in the VCLT regime is the third option. What follows from article 20 paragraph 4(b) and article 21 paragraph 3 VCLT is that the only thing which can happen is, that if an objecting state feels very strongly about a reservation, it will state that the whole treaty is not in effect between the reserving state and itself. This rarely happens, thus the reservation stands, whether it passed the legality test or not.

Others think differently on this. According to Anthony Aust, “if one or more contracting states have objected to the reservation as being prohibited, the reserving state must decide whether or not it is prepared to be a party without the reservation; and until it has made its position clear it cannot be regarded as a party”.

The difference of opinion on this is the fact that it is not likely that the articles 20 and 21 apply to reservations, which cannot to be made according to article 19 of the VCLT. However, they are applied in practice.

=== Example ===
Perhaps the most famous and controversial reservations are those taken by the United States when it signed the Convention on the Prevention and Punishment of the Crime of Genocide in 1986. The reservations taken were:

(1) That with reference to article IX of the Convention, before any dispute to which the United States is a party may be submitted to the jurisdiction of the International Court of Justice under this article, the specific consent of the United States is required in each case.
(2) That nothing in the Convention requires or authorizes legislation or other action by the United States of America prohibited by the Constitution of the United States as interpreted by the United States.

The second reservation may be interpreted as a statement that the national Constitution overrides any treaty obligations — a position mandated by a 1957 U.S. Supreme Court decision, Reid v. Covert. Under reciprocity, the United States cannot submit a legal case to the ICJ unless the other State agrees and does not state that it violates its national constitution.

Several nations expressed dismay and disapproval at the reservations, stating that it essentially made the treaty toothless. The responses included:

The Government of Ireland is unable to accept the second reservation made by the United States of America on the occasion of its ratification of the [said] Convention on the grounds that as a generally accepted rule of international law a party to an international agreement may not, by invoking the terms of its internal law, purport to override the provisions of the Agreement.

As concerns the first reservation, the Government of the Kingdom of the Netherlands recalls its declaration, made on 20 June 1966 on the occasion of the accession of the Kingdom of the Netherlands to the Convention […] stating that in its opinion the reservations in respect of article IX of the Convention, made at that time by a number of states, were incompatible with the object and purpose of the Convention, and that the Government of the Kingdom of the Netherlands did not consider states making such reservations parties to the Convention. Accordingly, the Government of the Kingdom of the Netherlands does not consider the United States of America a party to the Convention. […]

As the Convention may come into force between the Kingdom of the Netherlands and the United States of America as a result of the latter withdrawing its reservation in respect of article IX, the Government of the Kingdom of the Netherlands deems it useful to express the following position on the second reservation of the United States of America:

The Government of the Kingdom of the Netherlands objects to this reservation on the ground that it creates uncertainty as to the extent of the obligations the Government of the United States of America is prepared to assume with regard to the Convention. Moreover, any failure by the United States of America to act upon the obligations contained in the Convention on the ground that such action would be prohibited by the constitution of the United States would be contrary to the generally accepted rule of international law, as laid down in article 27 of the Vienna Convention on the law of treaties (Vienna, 23 May 1969)

The Government of the United Kingdom have consistently stated that they are unable to accept reservations to article IX. Accordingly, in conformity with the attitude adopted by them in previous cases, the Government of the United Kingdom do not accept the first reservation entered by the United States of America.
The Government of the United Kingdom object to the second reservation entered by the United States of America. It creates uncertainty as to the extent of the obligations which the Government of the United States of America is prepared to assume with regard to the Convention.

== Human rights treaties ==
The problem with inadmissible reservations happens more often with human rights treaties. Many reservations to these treaties have been made. However, not many states have expressed their objection. When states did make objections, not many have taken the position that the treaty is not in force between them and the reserving state, in the hope that they can influence the reserving states into eventually accepting all the provisions in the treaty.

Another source of difficulty is that human rights treaties do not create relations, per-se, between the states but create a system of protecting human rights. It is harder to find an objection to that which does not fail the legality test.

With some human rights treaties there are monitoring bodies like tribunals who can make binding decisions; e.g. the European Court of Human Rights in the 1988 Belilos case. In this case, the court decided that a certain reservation by Switzerland was an invalid one. It could, according to the court, therefore be disregarded but Switzerland remained bound by the treaty.

The court chose here for the option ‘The state which made the reservation is bound by the treaty including the parts on which it made the reservation’. Although Switzerland could have chosen to withdraw from the treaty, it chose not to do so.

Monitoring bodies are generally not allowed to make binding decisions; e.g. the Human Rights Committee which monitors the International Covenant on Civil and Political Rights. However this committee gave the impression in its General Comment no.24 that it could. In this case the committee stated that

the normal consequence of an unacceptable reservations is not that the covenant will not be in effect at all for a reserving party. Rather such a reservation will be generally be severable, in the sense that the covenant will be operative for the reserving party without benefit of the reservation.

As in Belilos, the result is that the committee chose the second option.

The committee decided that they were competent to make this decision because:

It necessarily falls to the Committee to determine whether a specific reservation is compatible with the object and purpose of the Covenant. This is in part because, as indicated above, it is an inappropriate task for States parties in relation to human rights treaties, and in part because it is a task that the Committee cannot avoid in the performance of its functions. …Because of its special character of a human rights treaty, the compatibility of a reservation with the object and purpose of the Covenant must be established objectively, by reference to legal principles, and the Committee is particularly well placed to perform this task.

This has been criticized for the reason above-stated regarding option three.

The Vienna Declaration and Programme of Action affirms that "all States are encouraged to accede to the international human rights instruments; all States are encouraged to avoid, as far as possible, the resort to reservation.

=== The International Law Commission ===
Because of a high number of reservations against human rights treaties, the International Law Commission (ILC) has, since 1994, included the topic in its work program. Originally the topic was named as “the law and practise relating to reservations to treaties” but this was later changed into “reservations to treaties”. For this topic a special Rapporteur, Mr. Alain Pellet, was appointed. As of 2009, the handling of this topic is still a work in progress.

The ILC was asked to check if the VCLT would have to be changed with reservations against human rights treaties. In the 1997 report the ILC rejected this idea. According to the ILC, the reasons why there were problems with reservations against human rights were the same reasons why there were problems with reservations against other treaties. Therefore, the ILC decided that no special regime for human rights treaties would be required.

Suggestions by the ILC concerning reservations were the following:

- Making provisions in the treaty itself which limit the opportunity of making reservations.
- Making clear in the treaty what exactly the object and purpose of the treaty is.

On this suggestion, the ILC stated that this solution could work only if there is political will for such a provision.

- Help facilitating mediation and negotiations between reserving states and objecting states.
- Human rights bodies should continue monitoring all the reservations to ensure the compliance of the treaty.
- States should add a clause in existing treaties to give monitoring bodies the power to determine the admissibility of a treaty.

However, when a monitoring body is established by a human rights treaty, it is allowed only to comment on or make recommendations about reservations. The ILC did not agree with General Comment 24 of the Human Rights Committee. The fact that the monitoring body can comment upon the admissibility of reservations has no effect on the principle of state consent. The Human Rights Committee stated that they themselves can decide what the consequence will be of an inadmissible reservation. The ILC states that only the reserving state can decide what action it will follow. The state can decide to withdraw or change its reservation or decide not to become a party to the treaty in question.

Further, the ILC stated that a guide to practice should be made consisting of guidelines to clarify certain problems in the VCLT concerning reservations. States welcomed this suggestion, although it must be added this guide to practice will have no binding legal force.

== Sources ==
=== Books and articles ===
- Aust, A, Modern Treaty Law and Practice, Cambridge University Press 2004
- Belilos, (1988) EHCR Pubs, Series A, vol. 132
- Goodman, R, Human Rights Treaties, Invalid Reservations and State Consent, "The American Journal of International Law", Vol. 96, No. 3. (Jul., 2002), pp. 531–560
- Klabbers, J, Accepting the Unacceptable? A New Nordic Approach to Reservations to Multiltereral Treaties, "Nordic Journal of International Law" 2000, pp. 179–193
- Korkella, Konstantin, New Challenges to the Regime of Reservations under the International Covenant on Civil and Political Rights, EJIL (2002), vol. 13, no. 2, pp. 437–477
- Parisi, Francesco, and Seveenko, Catherine, Treaty Reservations and the Economics of Article 21 (1) of the Vienna Convention, George Mason School of Law Series of Working Papers in Law and Economics

=== Cases ===
- General Comment No. 24 of the Human Rights Committee of the International Covenant on Civil and Political Rights, 15 HRLJ (1994) 464, at 467...
