= Convention Against Discrimination in Education =

1960 UNESCO treaty

The UNESCO Convention Against Discrimination in Education is a multilateral treaty which aims to combat discrimination in the field of education. It was adopted on 14 December 1960 in Paris and came into effect on 22 May 1962. The Convention ensures the free choice of religious education and private school, and the right to use or teach their own languages for national minority groups. The Convention prohibits any reservation. As of December 2025, 111 states were members of the Convention. It is the first international instrument which covers the right to education extensively and has a binding force in international law. It is recognized as a cornerstone of Education 2030 Agenda and represents a powerful tool to advance the Sustainable Development Goals (SDG4).

There is an additional Protocol Instituting a Conciliation and Good Offices Commission, which was adopted on 10 December 1962 and entered into force on 24 October 1968 in signatory States. As of October 2019, the Protocol has 37 members (including Vietnam; post-unification Vietnam has not expressed a position on whether it succeeds pre-unification South Vietnam as a member of the Protocol).

This Convention is also referred to in the Preamble of International Convention on the Elimination of All Forms of Racial Discrimination and UN International Convention on the Protection of the Rights of All Migrant Workers and Members of Their Families.

== Contents ==
Article 1 defines "discrimination" as any distinction, exclusion, limitation or preference on the basis of race, color, sex, language, religion, political or other opinion, origin national or social status, economic status or birth.

However, the article indicates a number of situations which are not to be considered to constitute discrimination. This includes the creation or maintenance of separate educational systems or establishments for pupils of both sexes, when they have easy access to education:

- establishment or maintenance on religious or linguistic grounds, and
- the establishment or maintenance of private educational institutions, if the purpose of such institutions is not to ensure exclusion of any group but to add to the educational opportunities offered by the public authorities.

Article 3 requires States to eliminate and prevent discrimination and Article 5 affirms respect for the freedom of parents in the choice of private schools, and for national minorities to have the right to engage in educational activities of their own and the employment or teaching of their own language.

Article 9 prohibits any reservation to the Convention.

== See also ==
- Academic bias
- Bias in curricula
- Discrimination in education
- Freedom of education
- Inclusion (education)
- Minority language
- Right to education
- List of international anti-discrimination acts
