= Stafford Sri Lankan School Doha =

Private institution in Doha, Qatar

Coordinates: 25°15′49.1″N 51°29′39.1″E

- Doha; Qatar

Information
- Type: Private
- Motto: Strive for Excellence
- Established: October 2001
- Principal: Shihana Raheem
- Grades: Upper Reception – Year 13
- Enrollment: c. 1,400 (late 2010s)
- Hours in school day: 5.5 (07:00 AM - 12:30 PM) Morning Shift (01:30 PM - 07:00 PM) Night Shift
- Houses: Garnet; Emerald; Topaz
- Colours: White and blue
- Website: www.slsqatar.info

Stafford Sri Lankan School Doha (SSLSD) is a private, non-profit community school in Doha, Qatar, inaugurated in October 2001 for the children of Sri Lankan expatriates in Qatar. Since 2011 it has been affiliated with the Embassy of Sri Lanka in Qatar and operates under its supervision. The school follows the Edexcel curriculum and is governed by a board of trustees.

== Overview ==
The school began in 2001 in rented premises, where it operated for many years. By the late 2010s it enrolled roughly 1,400 students, most from the Sri Lankan community but also from other nationalities. It offers education from Upper Reception to Year 13 and is recognised by Qatar's Ministry of Education and Higher Education as an approved community school, as well as an approved examination centre for Edexcel International.

== New building ==
In 2014 the Government of Qatar allotted a 10,000-square-metre plot in the Al Thumama area of Doha for a permanent school building, under the embassy's sponsorship. The foundation stone was laid in December 2018 at a groundbreaking ceremony attended by Qatari education and foreign-affairs officials and the Sri Lankan ambassador.

== Examinations and results ==
SSLSD follows the London Edexcel curriculum, with students assessed internally through monthly and semester examinations alongside external Edexcel assessments. As an approved Edexcel examination centre, students sit Edexcel IGCSE and International Advanced Level (IAL) examinations as well as primary and lower-secondary assessments. In November 2024 the school received Pearson's Outstanding Pearson School Award in recognition of student results across its Edexcel programmes.

== 2017 funding inquiry ==
In July 2017, following complaints alleging mismanagement of school funds, the Sri Lankan embassy requested that the school's bank account be temporarily frozen pending an investigation directed by Sri Lanka's Ministry of Foreign Affairs. The ambassador stated that the measure would not interrupt the school's operations.

== See also ==
- Ministry of Education and Higher Education (Qatar)
- List of universities and colleges in Qatar
- Education in Qatar
