= Supreme Education Council (Qatar) =

Ministry of Education and Higher Education
- Arabic: المجلس الأعلى للتعليم
- Supreme Education Council building in Doha

Agency overview
- Formed: November 2002
- Jurisdiction: Qatar
- Headquarters: Doha, Qatar
- Ministers responsible: Mohammad bin Abdul Wahed Al-Hammadi, Minister; Hind bint Hamad bin Khalifa Al-Thani, Deputy Minister
- Child agencies: The Education Institute; The Evaluation Institute; The Higher Education Institute
- Website: www.sec.gov.qa

The Supreme Education Council (Arabic: المجلس الأعلى للتعليم, abbreviated SEC) is a Qatari government agency responsible for education in Qatar. It was established in November 2002. It is responsible for overseeing and directing the education system in Qatar and, subsequently, all of the country's independent schools. At the time of its founding, it replaced the Ministry of Education, which has since had its responsibilities reduced to providing support for the country's private schools. The Ministry of Education's personnel were consolidated into the SEC in 2009. The Supreme Education Council was renamed to the Ministry of Education and Higher Education by an Amiri Decree in 2014.

== Organization ==
The SEC is headed by Buthaina bint Ali Al Jabr Al Nuaimi, minister of education, and Hind bint Hamad bin Khalifa Al-Thani, the deputy minister.

== Departmental bodies ==
The SEC has ten departments. The three most important are:

- The Education Institute – Is directly involved in the oversight and support of independent and semi-independent schools. It is responsible for developing curriculum standards and licensing private schools and pre-schools. It also prepares specialized development programmes for school administrators.
- The Evaluation Institute – Conducts national assessments of student learning of independent K-12 schools and collates the data. The institute is also responsible for teacher licensing.
- The Higher Education Institute – Assists students in applying for colleges and provides assistance for international admission tests.
