= Park House English School =

Location
- PO Box 22215; Doha; Qatar
- 25°13′46″N 51°30′5″E

Information
- School type: International Private School
- Established: 1994
- Founder: Heather Brennan
- Principal: John Smith
- Gender: Mixed
- Average class size: 25
- Language: English
- Hours in school day: 24 Hours (7:30-2:10)
- Houses: Panthers, Tigers, Leopards, Jaguars
- Colours: Green; Red
- Slogan: First Choice For Discerning Parents
- Sports: Football, Basketball, Volleyball, Swimming, Athletics
- Mascot: Parker The Lion
- Accreditation: Cambridge and EDEXCEL Examination Centre
- Website: www.parkhouseschool.com

Park House English School is a private international English school in Doha, Qatar. Park House English School was founded in Doha in 1994 by the Brennan family, and acquired by the International Schools Partnership in 2015.

== School Council ==
Heather Brennan remained the principal of the school until Dougie Smith took over. The current Principal, John Smith, took over in August 2017. The Head of Secondary is Mr. Chris Perry, the Head of Primary was Natasha Hilton until Cheska Tyler took over in August 2026.

== Accreditation ==
Park House English School is accredited by the following organizations:

- BSME: British Schools of The Middle East
- edexcel
- British Schools Overseas

Park House English School also follows a Cambridge curriculum and is a part of the University Of Cambridge.
