= Higher education in the Arab world =

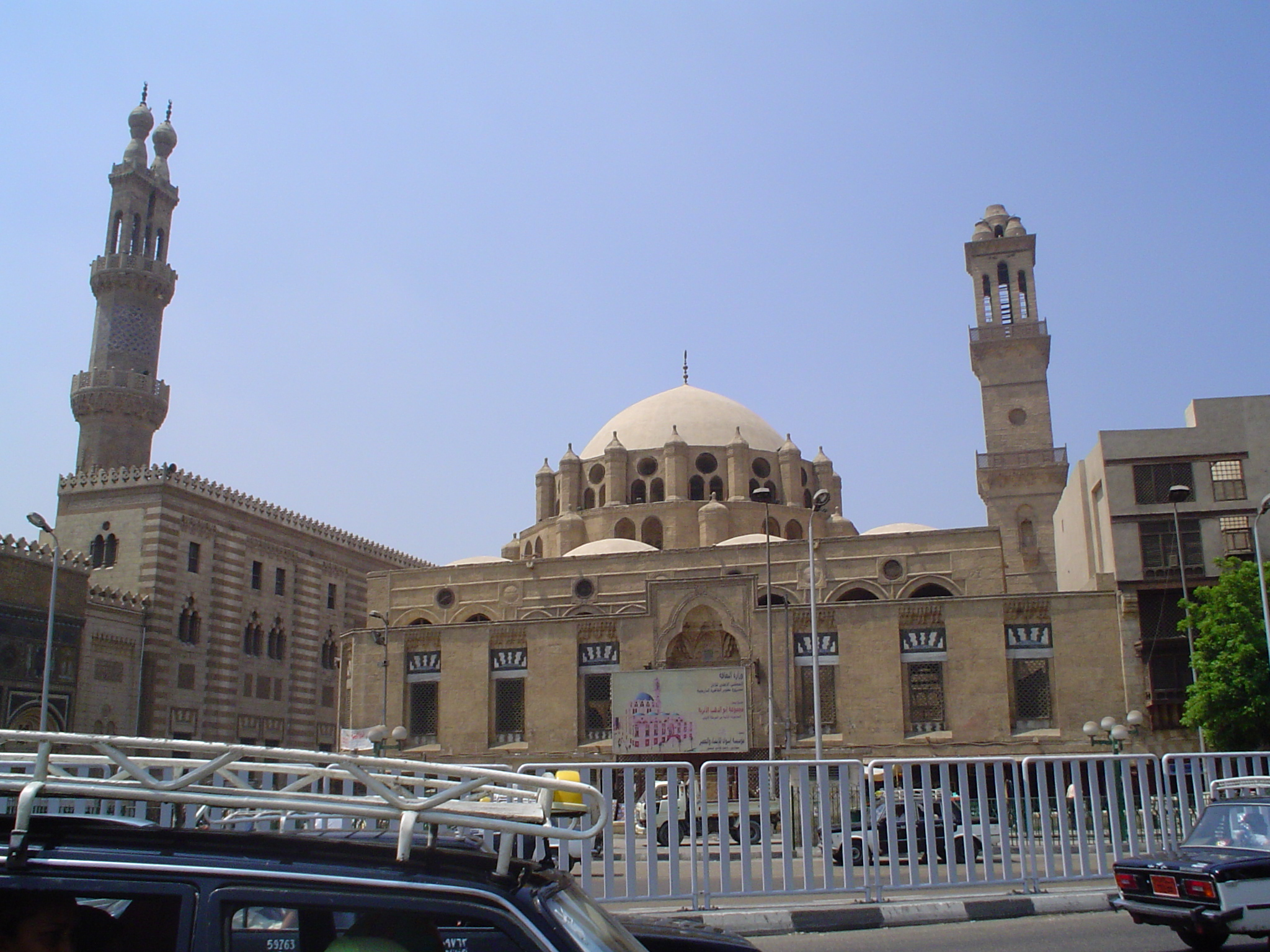
Al-Azhar University in Cairo.

Higher education in the Arab world is non-compulsory, formal study undertaken after secondary school across the 22 Arab states. Systems vary from country to country. They have developed from early learning centers to contemporary universities and colleges. Scholarship in this sector traces institutional, legal and methodological changes across Arabic contexts. From its origins in ancient centers of learning to the modern institutions shaping intellectual discourse today, the sector has undergone significant transformations throughout history.

The Arab world is also home to one of the oldest universities in the world, The oldest university in the world in continuous operation is the Ez-Zitouna University located in Tunisia, established in 737 AD first as a Madrasa then as a university. Despite the religion's dominance, in Madrasas students could learn about science, philosophy, mathematics, art, and many other subjects. Al-Azhar University was initially established in the tenth century C.E. in Cairo as a center for men to study Islamic law and theology, and now offers many academic disciplines to both male and female students. Histories of higher education in the Arab world trace lines from institutions of the Islamic scholarly tradition in the Islamic Golden Age to nineteenth- and twentieth-century universities shaped by colonial administration and nationalist reform. Aside from al-Azhar, many modern institutions began as colonial or missionary foundations established by European or U.S. sponsors in the early nineteenth century. They were few and largely served urban elites.

Higher education in the region has grown dramatically and has experienced many changes, since its beginnings in the colonial period, and especially since the middle of the twentieth century. In the 21st century, the Arab world's higher education sector faces numerous challenges amid opportunities brought by globalization and technological advancement. Quality assurance, accessibility, relevance, and brain drain are key concerns, prompting stakeholders to engage in dialogue and implement measures for improvement. Though significant differences exist between higher education sectors in each country of the Arab world, some general trends are evident, including navigating the forces of globalization and attempts to increase access and gender equality. Despite significant changes, Arab universities continue to receive relatively poor evaluations from the major global university-ranking systems.

== Contemporary history ==
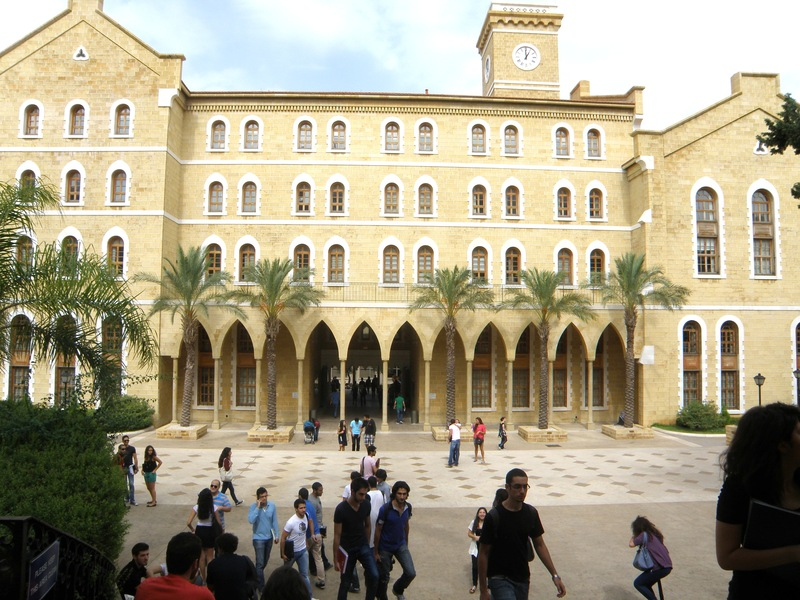
American University of Beirut students on campus.

Until the middle of the twentieth century, ten universities existed in the region, including the American University of Beirut (then called Syrian Protestant College), Université Saint Joseph in Beirut, Cairo University (then called the Egyptian University), University of Algeria, and University of Damascus (then called Syrian University). With the decline of official European colonialism and the independence of Arab countries after WWII, higher education institutions and student enrollment quickly multiplied. While pre-independence institutions were primarily private and foreign-operated, post-independence universities were largely public, state-run institutions. During this period a clear hierarchy among academic disciplines was developed; students with higher grades in secondary school were admitted into the science faculties, while "weaker" students were placed into social sciences, humanities, and Islamic studies.

In the post-war period, the number of universities in the Arab world increased; many existing madrasas and religious schools became part of the formal higher education system. The University of al-Qarawiyyin, which is sometimes considered the oldest university or oldest continually operation institution of higher learning in the world, became part of the modern Moroccan state university system in 1963; prior to this, it was run effectively as a madrasa.

Instability, globalization, and a general economic downturn in many Arab countries led to new reformist trends in higher education beginning in the 1980s and continuing today. The various reform movements are debated among the various stakeholders (governments, local and foreign institutions, students, citizens), and take on different characteristics in each Arab country. These (not always successful) reforms and trends include increasing privatization, calls for greater access, improving the capability of universities to meet the demands of society, matching educational "outputs" with labor market needs, and negotiating a competitive global education market.

There has been tremendous growth in higher education in the Arab world since the last years of the twentieth century. Student enrollment has jumped from roughly 3 million students in 1998/99 to about 7.5 million students in 2007/08, while the number of universities has grown almost three-fold in the same time period. Higher education in the region has also trended toward increased privatization, though considerable differences occur between countries; Bahrain, Lebanon, Oman, Palestine, and the UAE have the highest percentage of students enrolled in private universities (above 50 percent), while Iraq, Libya, Morocco, and Sudan have the lowest percentage of enrollment in private universities (20 percent or less).

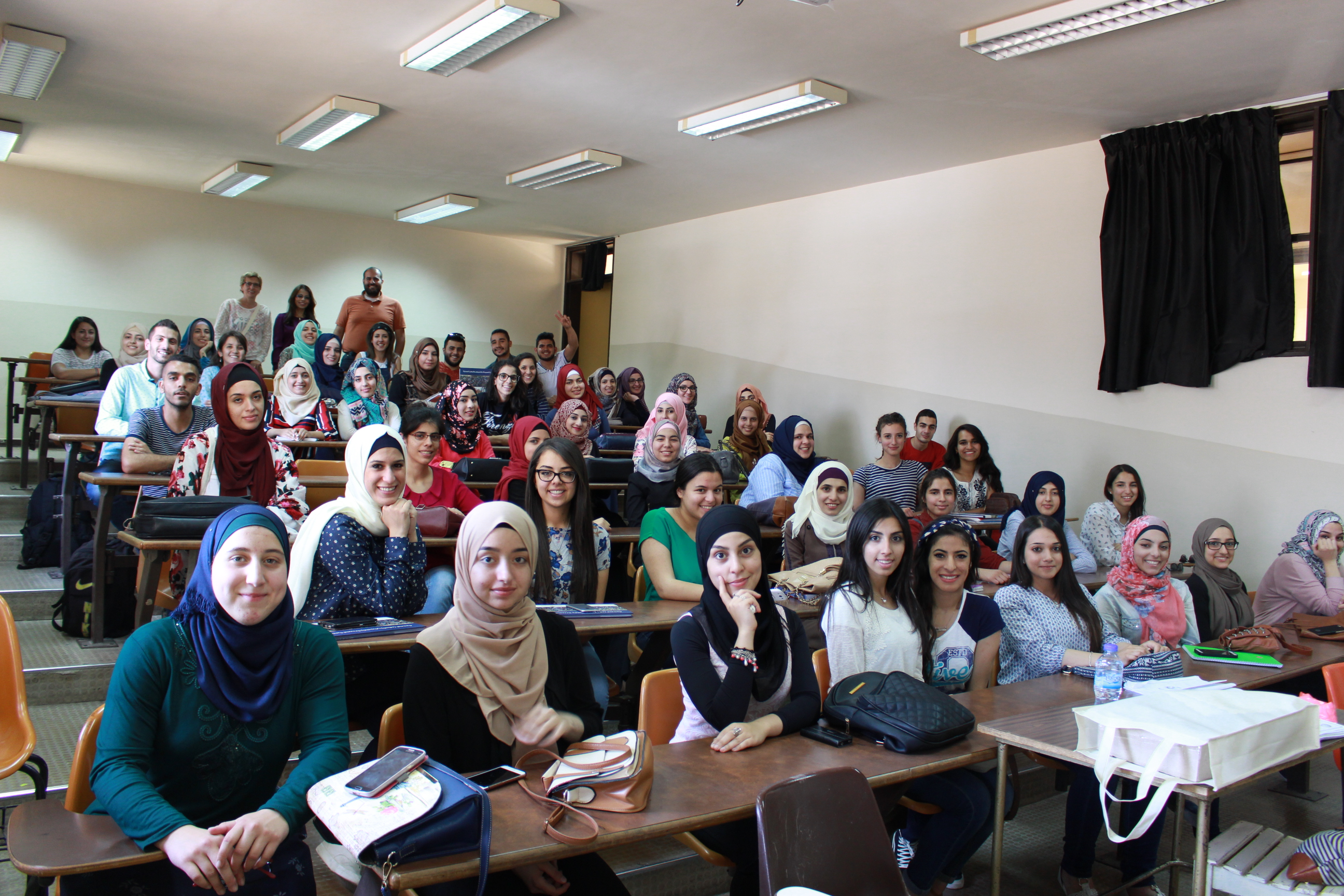
Palestinian students at Birzeit University in 2016.

In universities today, Islamic studies, social sciences, and the humanities are typically taught in Arabic, while "hard" sciences, technology, and medicine are usually taught in English or French (based on previous colonial rulers). Instruction in Arabic is almost exclusively carried out in Modern Standard Arabic, as opposed to the various colloquial dialects. Some countries have proposed – and to various degrees, enacted – policies to increase the amount of instruction in Arabic. This so-called "Arabization" of higher education is a highly contested issue that is infused with a variety of political and cultural debates in different Arab countries.

== Globalization ==
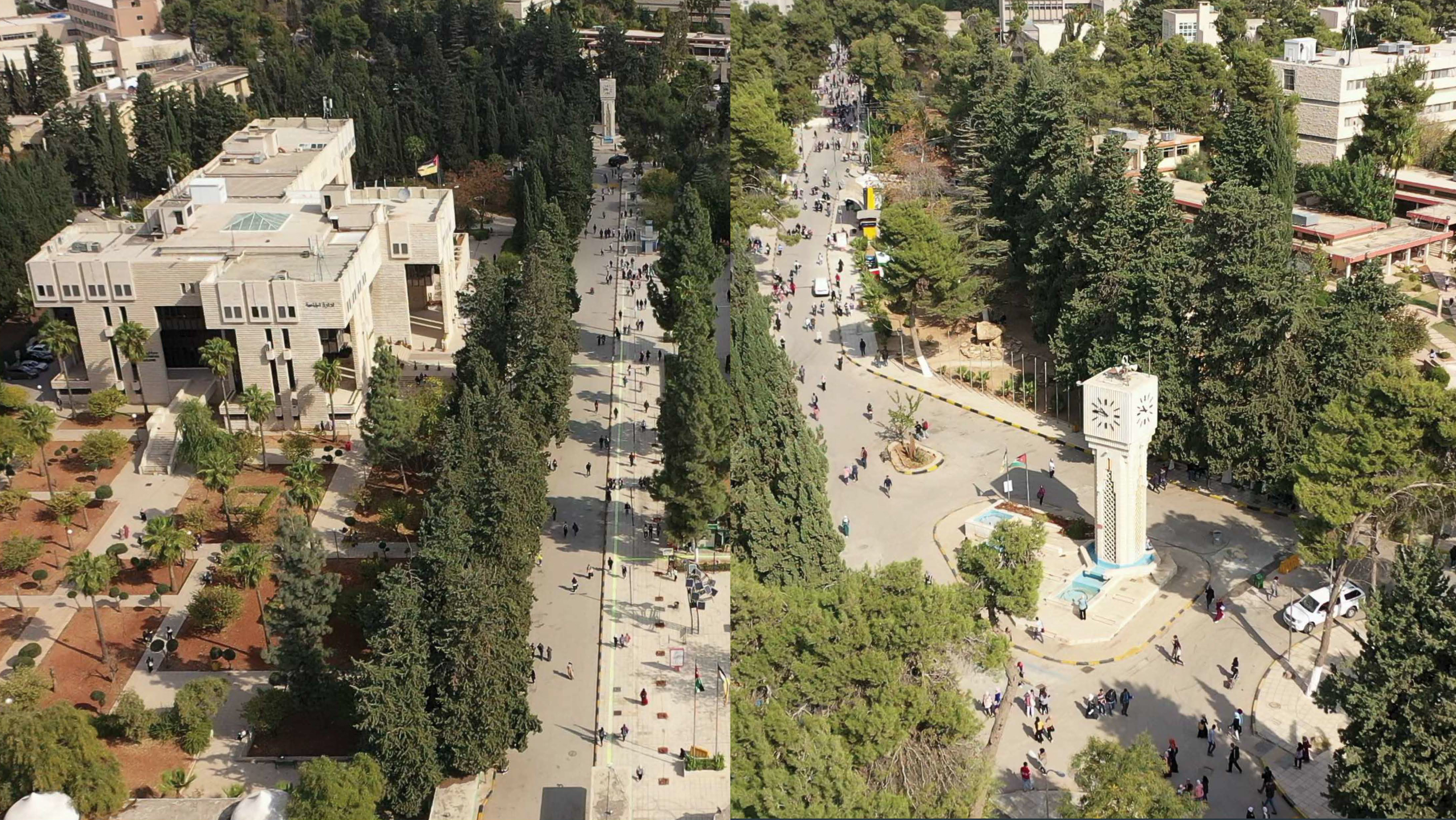
University of Jordan campus, Amman, stands as the first institution of higher education in Jordan, established in 1962.

As the world becomes increasingly interconnected, education has been identified by many as the essential means of preparing citizens to compete in a "knowledge-based" global economy. In higher education, globalization and rising inter-connectivity is manifested in a variety of trends, such as a growing number of students who receive degrees from universities outside their country of origin, the increasing number of students, especially from the U.S., who participate in study abroad programs, the emergence of international "branch" campuses, the presence of international faculty, and global higher education ranking systems. Globalization strategies worldwide have led to an increasingly homogenized higher education sector, as governments and institutions seek to meet global standards. Furthermore, some scholars have argued that increasing globalization has actually led to a contemporary form of imperialism, in which economic and cultural norms and discourses are imposed by dominant nations on weaker nations.

In recent years, member states of the World Trade Organization (WTO) have been debating the application of the General Agreement on Trades in Services (GATS) to the field of higher education. This free-trade policy affects the status of non-national education providers, including the recognition of degrees earned from such institutions, and has implications on access to and quality of education, economic development and innovation. Arab members of the WTO have been hesitant to negotiate trade agreements related to GATS and the free trade of educational services (though several Arab countries allow foreign institutions to operate within their borders). Among the concerns shared by opponents of the free trade of education is the possibility that GATS will marginalize or eliminate national universities that cannot compete financially with trans-national institutions; that the rise of non-national institutions will erode the native cultural aspects of education; and that a free-trade educational environment would reduce access to higher education and become an "elitist system." Proponents of GATS, meanwhile, argue that the free-trade policy will lead to increased efficiency, improved educational programs, and lower costs for students.

Cassidy highlights several areas that Arab higher education institutions must address in order to effectively train students in the contemporary, globalized era, including the ability to effectively utilize new technologies, the capability and willingness to collaborate on a global scale, and the flexibility to adapt in variable circumstances. Some scholars and educators have pushed the conversation further, wondering whether universities across the globe should develop universal standards and benchmarks. Some educators argue that standardization would help universities develop along an educational "road map," while others maintain that diversification is a great strength of higher education, and even doubt that such global standards could be developed; other education professionals, meanwhile, contend that the global ranking systems are already beginning to fill the role of global standardization.

=== International universities in the Gulf nations ===
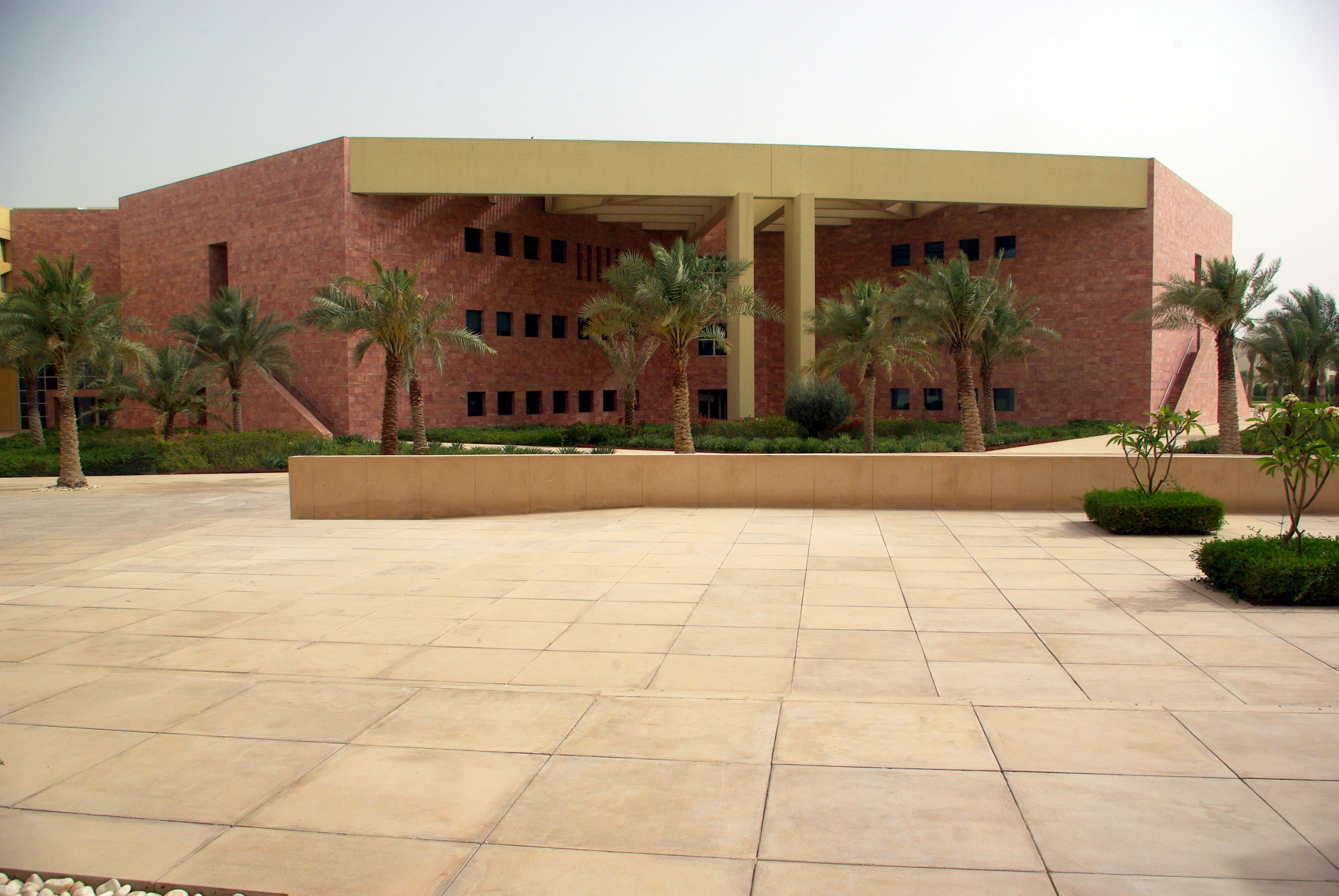
A building on the campus of Education City in Doha, Qatar.

The Arab states of the Persian Gulf – Bahrain, Kuwait, Oman, Qatar, Saudi Arabia, and United Arab Emirates – have embraced the "Western" model of higher education perhaps more than any other Arab country. In countries such as Qatar and UAE, this embrace is reflected by a multitude of foreign "branch" campuses, particularly in Education City in Qatar, and Dubai Academic City. Roughly one-third of all international branch campuses are located in the Arab world, with the vast majority in the Persian Gulf region - and especially in Qatar and UAE. One reason for the growth of foreign branch campuses is Arab leaders' willingness and ability to invest large amounts of money in the projects. Scholars have identified other important explanations for this trend, such as the need to provide a growing youth population with educational options that will prepare them to succeed in a global, knowledge-based economy. Kuwait has limited options to choose government run institutes but wide range of private universities. These private universities in Kuwait have large campuses, infrastructure and modern facilities. All of them are fast-growing, owned by businesses, focus on local students and are affiliated with western universities in some way. However, they fail to impress in the global rankings of university. The Private University Council (PUC) is a government body which controls private universities in Kuwait. The universities in Bahrain are unable to make it to the top places in Arab world. Political leaders in Arab states of the Persian Gulf are utilizing specialized "Western" universities to compete with local institutions and fill the gaps in their educational programs. Although Persian Gulf countries are also increasingly sending their citizens overseas to study, the branch campuses provided more options for those students who cannot - for a variety of reasons - go abroad to study.

== Gender equality and access ==
Gender equality in higher education varies from country to country and has changed over time. In Bhandari and El-Amine's study of seven Arab countries (Jordan, Lebanon, Morocco, Qatar, Saudi Arabia, Tunisia, UAE), the researchers found that men and women each comprise about 50 percent of higher education enrollment. There are, however, significant differences between universities; for example, a handful of universities in the Persian Gulf countries are designated for a single gender (male-only or female-only), and so female enrollment ranges from zero (male-only) to 100 percent (female-only). Some universities, particularly in Saudi Arabia, admit both men and women but have separate campuses for each gender, while other universities allow both genders on the same campus but teach them in separate classrooms. About 85 percent of the universities analyzed in this study are entirely co-educational. The researchers identified Morocco and Lebanon as the countries with the highest level of gender equity in terms of enrollment and co-education.

In a separate study examining Bahrain, Egypt, Jordan, Morocco, and Saudi Arabia, Kirdar has argued that despite large enrollment numbers among women in Arab universities – as well as many Arab women studying in Europe and the U.S. – patriarchal restrictions have prevented many women from parlaying high levels of education into social and political authority. Other scholars are similarly noted that tertiary education does not necessarily lead to higher levels of female involvement or success in politics or the workforce.

Some scholars are also concerned that women, while enrolling in relatively large numbers across much of the Arab world, are over-represented in such fields as arts, humanities, education, and nursing, and under-represented in professional and scientific fields. In Egypt, for example, women represent roughly 72 percent of the total enrollment in the fields of arts, humanities, and education, while comprising less than 30 percent of the total enrollment in engineering.

Others have argued that while gender equality in higher education has improved dramatically in recent decades, equitable access to higher education remains a problem among the poor members (both men and women) of many Arab countries.

== Global rankings ==
Arab universities have little representation in the major university-ranking systems – Academic Ranking of World Universities (ARWU), World University Rankings (WUR), and QS World University Rankings (QS).

ARWU is compiled by Shanghai Jiao Tong University, and lists the top 500 universities. Universities are ranked 1-500, with 1-100 individually ranked, 101-200 ranked in groups of 50 (101-150, 151-200), and the remainder are ranked in groups of 100 (201-300, 301-400, 401-500). ARWU gauges performance using a variety of markers, including the number of Nobel Prize-winners among alumni and faculty, number of published papers in academic journals, number of references to papers published by university faculty, and per capita academic performance. The top-ranked Arab university in ARWU is King Saud University (Saudi Arabia), at #151-200. The remaining ranked Arab universities are King Abdulaziz University (Saudi Arabia, #201-300); King Fahd University of Petroleum and Minerals (Saudi Arabia, #301-400); Cairo University (#401-500); King Abdullah University of Science and Technology (Saudi Arabia, #401-500); and University of Jordan (#801-900).

WUR is produced by Times Higher Education, which utilizes 13 "performance indicators" across five general fields: teaching, research, citations, industry income, and international outlook. Universities are ranked 1-400, with 1-200 individually ranked, 201-300 ranked in groups of 25 (201-225, 226-250, etc.), and 301-400 ranked in groups of 50 (301-350, 351-400). There are only two Arab universities ranked in the top 400 of WUR, both in Saudi Arabia: King Abdulaziz University (#351-400), and King Saud University (#351-400). There are, however, a few more universities ranked in the separate "Asia University Rankings": King Fahd University of Petroleum and Minerals (Saudi Arabia, #62); United Arab Emirates University (#86); and American University of Beirut (#87).

The QS rankings, produced by Quacquarelli Symonds, uses six indicators to rank universities: academic reputation (as determined from surveys), employer reputation (as determined from surveys), faculty-student ratio, citations per faculty, proportion of international students, and proportion of international faculty. Universities are ranked 1-800, with 1-399 individually ranked, and 400-800 ranked into progressively larger groups (the final 100 are simply ranked as 700+). The top-ranked Arab university is again in Saudi Arabia: King Fahd University of Petroleum and Minerals (#216). The QS rankings include the highest number of ranked Arab universities, mostly because this system ranks many more universities (800) than either ARWU (500) or WUR (400). Arab universities ranked by QS are: American University of Beirut (#250); King Saud University (Saudi Arabia, #253); American University in Cairo (#348); King Abdulaziz University (Saudi Arabia, #360); United Arab Emirates University (#421-430); American University of Sharjah (UAE, #431-440); University of Jordan (#498); Imam Mohammad Ibn Saud Islamic University (Saudi Arabia, #491-500); Sultan Qaboos University (Oman, #501-550); Cairo University (#551-600); Qatar University (#551-600); Umm Al-Qura University (Saudi Arabia, #551-600); Abu Dhabi University (UAE, #601-650); Ain Shams University (Egypt, #601-650); King Khalid University (Saudi Arabia, #601-650); Université Saint Joseph (Lebanon, #601-650); Al Azhar University (Egypt, #651-700); Jordan University of Science and Technology (#651-700); Alexandria University (Egypt, #700+); King Faisal University (Saudi Arabia, #700+); Kuwait University (#700+); University of Baghdad (#700+); and University of Bahrain (#700+).

The three major ranking systems subdivide their rankings into major world regions, QS World University rankings now publishes a regional ranking for the "Arab Region". In an attempt to address the lack of a distinct Middle East/North Africa region, IIE published the Higher Education Classification in the Middle East and North Africa, in 2012, which surveys the higher education sectors in Jordan, Lebanon, Morocco, Qatar, Saudi Arabia, Tunisia, and the United Arab Emirates. The study evaluates six dimensions of higher education in these countries: institutional characteristics (i.e. public or private), curriculum organization/system, student profile, cultural orientation (Arab, American, French, or British), regional engagement, and international engagement. The study encountered several obstacles in collecting data, including a reluctance to participate on the part of governments and institutions, lack of centralized institutional data, and political instability (the study was developed during and after the major protests in 2011; for this reason, Egypt was excluded from the study completely).

=== Critiques of university rankings ===
While university rankings are influential - often being utilized by institutions to develop future policies - and widely discussed by those in academia, many scholars and educators are critical of the rankings' usefulness. In general, critics argue that the rankings are highly subjective and the methodologies are faulty. Among the most common criticisms of the rankings are: that they rely too heavily on "reputation," a subjective marker that is determined by worldwide surveys of academics and administrators; that many regions of the world outside the U.S. and Western Europe are underrepresented in the surveys; that "research impact" is too focused on quantity of publications and not quality; that student and employer perspectives are notably absent from the ranking methodologies; and that Nobel Prize-winners are given a disproportionate amount of weight in the methodologies (particularly in the ARWU rankings). Some scholars and educators in the Arab world have joined in the critique of the rankings, sharing the concern that the supposed "objective" rankings are really quite subjective, and further arguing that the rankings are biased in favor of Western universities. Others in the Arab world have pointed to a lack of financial resources (especially outside the Arab States of the Persian Gulf), difficulties publishing research in English-language journals, and the limited ability of Arab scholars to participate in international conferences and collaborations as important factors that explain Arab universities' poor showing in the rankings. The fact that Saudi Arabia boasts the top Arab university in each of the three ranking systems is often attributed to high levels of government funding for education, an emphasis on research in the science and engineering fields.

A review of university ranking methodologies identified limitations. Scholars from the Arab region proposed two methods tailored for a global ranking and an Arab ranking. They argue that current frameworks bias outcomes against Arab institutions and call for re-calibrating indicator weights to reflect institutional differences. The proposals seek adjustments to metrics and weighting to enable more comparable assessments.
