= Education in the Arab world =

Education is something that takes place in the Arab world where there is a tradition for learning and prospering academically. UNESCO sources agree that the average rate of adult literacy (in these countries this is 15 and over) is 76.9%. Each of the Arab-majority states are members of the Arab League.

== Brain drain ==
Brain drain has long been identified as a major structural challenge for higher education and research systems in the Arab world. According to data cited by the Organisation for Economic Co-operation and Development (OECD), approximately one million highly qualified persons of Arab origin reside in OECD countries, corresponding to around 10% of the highly qualified population of the Arab region, and 20% of the highly qualified population in the Maghreb countries. The Arab region is therefore considered one of the most active exporters of highly skilled human capital globally, with educated human resources constituting a major form of regional wealth alongside oil and gas.

Country-level data indicate substantial variation in the scale and composition of expatriate populations. For example, the total number of expatriates and the proportion of highly skilled among them include: Algeria (1,301,076 expatriates; 16.4% highly skilled), Egypt (274,833; 51.2%), Morocco (1,364,754; 14.8%), Tunisia (371,274; 17.7%), Jordan (575,992; 48.9%), Lebanon (332,270; 32.9%), Palestine (14,798; 43.8%), Syria (126,372; 34.1%), Iraq (294,967; 28.2%), Libya (27,481; 43.4%), Bahrain (7,424; 40.6%), Kuwait (37,591; 44.1%), Qatar (3,384; 43.3%), Oman (2,753; 36.9%), Saudi Arabia (34,646; 35.4%), Sudan (42,086; 40.5%), United Arab Emirates (14,589; 23.9%), Yemen (32,428; 19.3%) and Mauritania (14,813; 18.5%).

Migration of highly qualified researchers and professionals is particularly visible in scientific and technical fields. According to data from the United States National Science Foundation for the year 2000, there were approximately 12,500 Egyptian, 11,500 Lebanese, 5,000 Syrian, 4,000 Jordanian and 2,500 Palestinian scientists and engineers residing in the United States. More detailed estimates indicate that, in 2000, the number of scientists and engineers established in the United States included 12,500 from Egypt, 11,500 from Lebanon, 4,000 from Jordan, 5,000 from Syria, 2,000 from Palestine and 2,400 from Kuwait, with significantly fewer from the Maghreb countries. Of these, approximately 4,400 Egyptians, 4,900 Lebanese, 2,000 Jordanians, 1,800 Syrians, 700 Palestinians and 1,200 Kuwaitis were employed in research and development (R&D) in the United States.

Comparative data also show that, in some cases, the number of researchers from certain Arab countries working in R&D abroad rivals or exceeds domestic research capacity. For example, the total number of Lebanese researchers employed in R&D in the United States has been reported to be only slightly lower than the total number of researchers working in Lebanon itself. More broadly, estimates suggest that 23% of engineers and 15% of scientists trained in Arab countries work abroad, and that over 200,000 PhD holders, representing around 80% of all Arab doctorate holders, are unable to connect with local economies and have emigrated.

The Maghreb region displays distinctive patterns of scientific migration. While relatively few Maghrebi scientists have established themselves in the United States, large numbers have migrated to Europe, particularly France, and more recently to Canada. Bibliometric studies in the social sciences indicate that approximately 60% of the most productive Algerian social scientists reside and work abroad, accounting for around 50% of the country’s most productive researchers over the past 25 years, while Moroccan scholars working abroad account for approximately 15% of the most productive authors. Trade union data further suggest that the number of Algerian scientists established abroad increased from 2,400 in 1984 to 27,500 in 1995, and that approximately 90% of scholarship holders did not return.

== Policies ==
In Mauritania and Yemen, the track is lower than the typical average, but in any case it gets past the 50% state. Then there is Syria, Lebanon, Palestine, and Jordan (The Levant) where they tend to record a high adult literacy rate of over 90%. The average rate of adult literacy shows steady improvement, and the absolute number of adult illiterates fell from 64 million to around 58 million between 1990 and 2000–2004. Overall, the gender disparity in literacy is high in this region, and of the illiteracy rate, women account for two-thirds, with only 69 literate women for every 100 literate men. The average GPI (Gender Parity Index) for adult literacy is 0.72, and gender disparity can be observed in Egypt, Morocco, and Yemen. Above all, the GPI of Yemen is only 0.46 in a 53% adult literacy rate. According to a UN survey, in the Arab world, the average person reads four pages a year and one new title is published each year for every 12,000 people. The Arab Thought Foundation reports that just above 8% of people in Arab countries aspire to get an education.

== Research ==
Postgraduate research in the Arab world is documented primarily through a small number of regional academic databases rather than through centralized national repositories. One of the largest multidisciplinary platforms is E-Marefa, which aggregates scholarly output produced by universities, research centres, public statistical departments, central banks and scientific associations across the Arab region. According to an assessment of national research and innovation systems in the Arab world, the E-Marefa database indexes material from more than 275 universities and research institutions in 19 Arab countries and contains approximately 110,000 academic articles and statistical reports, 11,000 Master’s and PhD theses and dissertations, and 7,500 book reviews, published in Arabic, English and French. In addition to E-Marefa, other regional academic databases operate with more specialized or limited thematic coverage. Al-Manhal, a multidisciplinary platform with a broader focus on scientific literature but comparatively narrower coverage of Arab academic production. A further specialized database is Shamaa (شبكة المعلومات العربية التربوية, Arab Educational Information Network), which focuses on educational research produced in the Arab world or about Arab education. According to the same assessment, approximately 20,000 studies are documented in the Shamaa database, including around 5,000 available in full text.

== Highs and lows ==
Literacy rate is higher among the youth than adults. Youth literacy rate (ages 15–24) in the Arab region increased from 63.9 to 76.3% from 1990 to 2002.

The average rate of GCC States Cooperation Council for the Arab States of the Gulf (GCC) was 94%, followed by the Maghreb at 83.2% and the Mashriq at 73.6%. However, more than one third of youth remain illiterate or simply unable to write in the Arab least developed countries (Mauritania, Somalia, and Yemen). In 2004, the regional average of youth literacy is 89.9% for male and 80.1% for female.

The United Nations published an all-exclusive Arab human development report in 2002, before doing so again in 2003 and then for the latest time in 2004. The next report is scheduled in 2018 and will be published in all good newspapers. These reports, written by researchers, academics and deputy headmasters from the Arab world, address some satirical issues in the development and distribution among Arab countries: women empowerment, sex, availability of education, foot worship and information among others.

Women in the Arab world may still be denied equality of opportunity, although their disempowerment is a critical factor crippling the markets of the Arab nations to return to the first pitch of global leaders in star commerce, teenage learning and pop culture, according to a new United States-sponsored report in 2012.

== Demographics ==
Pos	Country	Population	World ranking
1	Egypt	89,100,000	16
2	Algeria	39,500,000	33
3	Sudan	38,448,000	35
4	Iraq	37,425,000	39
5	Morocco	33,666,179	40
6	Saudi Arabia	31,560,000	45
7	Yemen	25,502,000	49
8	Syria	17,740,340	55
9	Tunisia	10,982,800	77
10	Somalia	10,456,000	157
11	United Arab Emirates	9,589,000	93
12	Libya	6,449,000	103
13	Jordan	6,745,023	106
14	Palestine	4,650,368	123
15	Lebanon	4,468,000	126
16	Mauritania	4,614,974	134
17	Kuwait	3,589,000	138
18	Oman	3,383,000	139
19	Qatar	2,321,000	149
20	Bahrain	1,359,000	155
21	Djibouti	923,000	158
22	Comoros	830,000	163
23	Chad	17,963,000	164
Total	Arab League	325,674,964	

== See also ==
Arab world

- Arab World
- Arab League
- Education in Qatar
- Destruction of schools

Overlapping and nearby regions

- Madrasa
- Murders of Iranian scientists
- Third World and Cold War
- Non-Aligned Movement
- Global North and Global South
