= Philippine School Doha =

- المدرسة الفلبينية الدوحة

Location
- Mesaimeer; Qatar; 25°12′38″N 51°31′15″E

Information
- Type: Private Community School
- Motto: Service and Excellence
- Established: October 1992
- Principal: Alexander S. Acosta, PhD
- Grades: K to 12
- Website: psd.sch.qa

Philippine School Doha (Arabic: المدرسة الفلبينية الدوحة), also known as PSD, is an international school in Qatar geared towards the local Filipino population. The school has undergone numerous processes to gain its DepEd recognition, finally receiving it in 2000. In 2011, the school received a prize from the Supreme Education Council as one of the highest achieving international schools in Qatar.

== History ==
The Philippine School Doha was established in October 1992 to serve the educational needs of the children of the Filipino community in the State of Qatar. Its birth was the result of the action of members of the Filipino community in Doha under the auspices of the Philippine Embassy. As required under the laws of the Philippines, the school has been incorporated as a non-stock, non-profit educational corporation and is duly registered as the Philippine School in Doha, Inc. with the Securities and Exchange Commission. As such, the school is governed by the Corporation Code and special laws and regulations of the Philippines.

The school is also governed by Amiri Ordinance No. 7 of the year 1980 regarding organization of private schools in the State of Qatar and by applicable regulations of concerned local authorities. In accordance with the general provisions of the said Ordinance, PSD was given permission by the Ministry of Education and Higher Education to operate as a private school of the Filipino community in Qatar, under the patronage of the Philippine Embassy in Doha. The Department of Education Culture and Sports, granted the PSD the permit to operate on March 6, 1997, per Government Permit No. 002, s. 1997. Subsequently, on February 1, 2000, Philippine School Doha was granted recognition by the DECS per Government Recognition No. 001, s. 2000.

In 2016, the school was one of twelve schools excluded from Qatar's education voucher system.

In 2017, PSD relocated to a brand new campus.

== Function ==
The Philippine School Doha follows the MATATAG Curriculum required by the Philippine Department of Education. Its present principal is Dr. Alexander S. Acosta Ph.D., who came to his current post in 2003.

== Facilities ==
A picture of the school canteen, at one of its highest points.

Philippine School Doha has facilities including a gym, canteen, swimming pool, open court, library, multimedia room, and an audiovisual room.

== Students and Staff ==
Notable students and alumni of Philippine School Doha include Gian Bernardino.

=== Student Paper ===
The logo of PSD's The Link.

The Link is the official publication of Philippine School Doha run by the Research Development, Accreditation, and Publication Office (RDAPO). Pursuant to the Republic Act 7079 or the Campus Journalism Act of 1991, Philippine School Doha has campus journalism and freedom of speech through the school paper.
