= Qatar International School =

School in Doha, Qatar

Information
- Established: 1977; 49 years ago
- Years: Reception - Year 13
- Enrollment: c.2000
- Language: English
- Website: www.qisweb.qis.org

Qatar International School (QIS) is a British-patterned international school which follows the IGCSE/A-level system. It is located in downtown Doha. The school provides education from reception (foundation stage) to Year 13.

== About the School ==
QIS was founded by Sheikh Ali bin Ahmed bin Thani Al Thani and the first Principal, Joyce Griffin, in 1977. It is one of the first British-patterned international schools in Qatar.

In 2001, the school relocated to the Al Dafna district, and currently has an enrollment of approximately 2,000 students.

Then, in 2020, QIS acquired two international accreditations:

Firstly, QIS was judged to be ‘outstanding’ in every category of the UK government’s British School Overseas (BSO) inspection framework.

Secondly, in the same year, QIS became the first school globally to receive Council for International Schools (CIS) accreditation through a new fast-track process designed for outstanding schools.

QIS went on to become the only school in the Middle East accredited to deliver OLEVI training courses straight from the UK, such as The Outstanding Teacher Programme. The school also partners with many other training providers.

== Curriculum ==
Students are taught in Key Stages from Early Years and Key Stage 1 through to Key Stage 5, and examinations are taken in GCSE, IGCSE and A Levels using UK examination boards.
