= Transport in Doha =

Since the early 2000s, Doha, the capital of Qatar has been undergoing an extensive expansion in its transportation network including the addition of new highways, the construction of a new airport, and the addition of the Doha metro. These projects are meant to keep up with the population's rapid growth, which has strained the country's current infrastructure.

== Highways ==
There are five main highways connecting Doha to its neighboring cities. These are the Dukhan Highway to the west of the city, the Al Shamal Road, connecting Doha to the north of the country, the Al Khor Coastal Road, connecting Doha to the northern town of Al Khor, and the Al Wakrah/Mesaieed Road, connecting Doha to the south of the country. Finally, Salwa Road runs through south Doha and connects the city to the Saudi border to the south of the country.

These highways are all currently undergoing expansion, and are being expanded within Doha itself.

=== Doha Expressway Project ===
The Doha Expressway was a major infrastructure project undertaken by the Qatari government to address the rising transportation demands of the rapidly developing capital city of Doha. Conceived as the nation's inaugural freeway system, the project aims to establish a modern and efficient road network spanning both urban and rural areas of the Doha Metropolitan Area. It was launched in 2007 and completed in 2015 at a cost of approximately 15 billion Qatari riyals ($4120879).

The expressway's implementation was carried out in multiple phases, encompassing the construction of numerous underpasses, flyovers, and interchanges to facilitate traffic flow. The initial stages involved the development of a 6-kilometer, three-lane dual carriageway between the Garrafa and Asiri interchanges, along with the completion of the Industrial Interchange project, which featured a new flyover linking Doha to the Industrial Area and an underpass along Salwa Road.

Subsequent phases focused on extending the expressway by constructing additional multi-lane dual carriageways, connecting various intersections and landmarks, such as the E-Ring Road, Al-Muntazah Street, and the New Doha International Airport. The project included the establishment of the G-Ring Road, a 22-kilometer, three-lane dual-carriageway stretching from Road 55 to the airport. The Public Works Authority (Ashghal) hired several international consultants and contractors, including Parsons International for concept design, KBR for program management, and AECOM for site supervision and quantity surveying.

=== Al Majd Road ===
Al Majd Road is the longest highway in Qatar, running at a length of 195 kilometres (121 mi) from south-to-north. It begins in Mesaieed in Al Wakrah Municipality and extends north towards Ras Laffan on the coast in Al Khor Municipality.

Constructed by Ashghal (the Public Works Authority), the road features 7 lanes in both directions, which altogether can accommodate roughly 16,000 vehicles an hour. There are 21 main interchanges, linking the highway with other important roads such as G-Ring Road, Salwa Road, Dukhan Highway, and Al Shamal Road. Ashghal claims that the road reduces travel times by up to 50% from its beginning to end when compared with the alternative route running through Doha proper.

The highway opened on an official level in February 2019; its opening marked a name change from the Orbital Highway to Al Majd Road.

=== Al Shamal Road ===
Al Shamal Road is approximately 95.2 km in length and connects the Doha Metropolitan Area with the northern region of Al Shamal. Starting in June 2012, Ashghal commenced the North Road Corridor Enhancement Project, which saw the construction of over 200 km of service roads and the redevelopment of Al Shamal Road.

In the future, Al Shamal Road is planned to connect Doha with the planned Qatar-Bahrain Friendship Bridge at Al Zubarah, connecting the two Persian Gulf states in a similar manner to how Bahrain and Saudi Arabia are currently connected.

=== Al Khor Road ===
Commutes between Doha and the municipality of Al Khor are currently facilitated Al Khor Road (also referred to as Al Khor Coastal Road), which runs through Al Daayen.

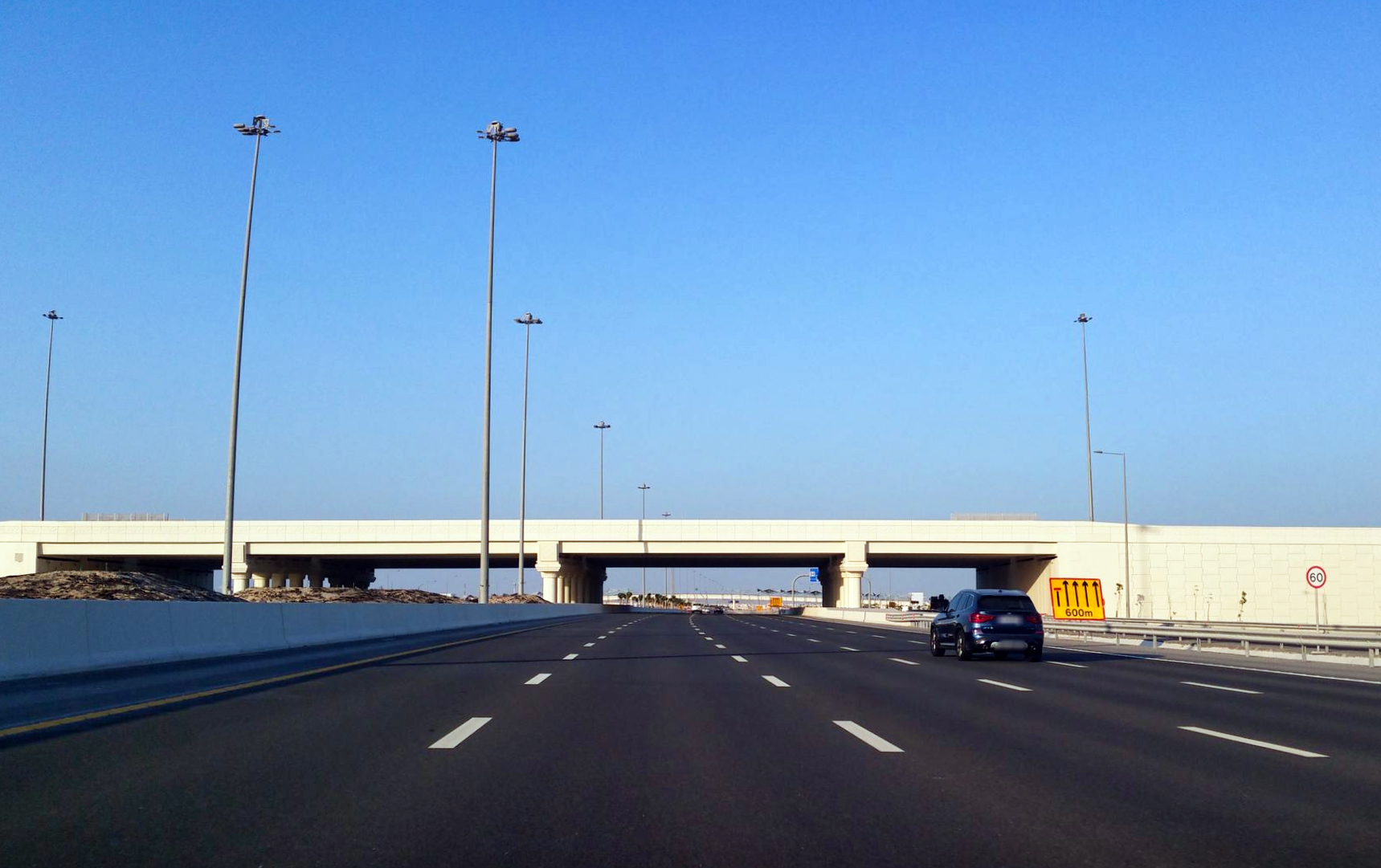
Al Khor Coastal Road

Construction on the road began in 2016, after Turkish company Tekfen was contracted to construct the road at a cost of $2.1 billion. The road runs for 33 km and has 29 tunnels and 5 bridges. It is the main route connecting the Doha Metropolitan Area and Lusail with Al Khor, terminating at the Al Bayt Stadium. Over 20 residential areas are served by the road, including Simaisma, Umm Qarn and The Pearl, and the industrial hubs of Mesaieed and Dukhan are indirectly served by the road via its intersection with Al Majd Road. Tourist destinations served by the road include Al Farkiya Beach, Katara Cultural Village and Simaisma Beach.

In 2020, an olympic cycling track was opened to the public. It stretches for almost 33 km to the immediate west of the highway. Connected to the cycling path is a 38 km-long pedestrian path which has 18 underpasses, opened a year later in 2021. In September 2020, the development was entered into the Guinness Book of World Records for two separate accolades: having the longest unbroken expanse of paved asphalt at 25.275 kilometers, and having the most expansive cycling track connected to the highway, at 32.8 km.

=== Lusail Expressway ===
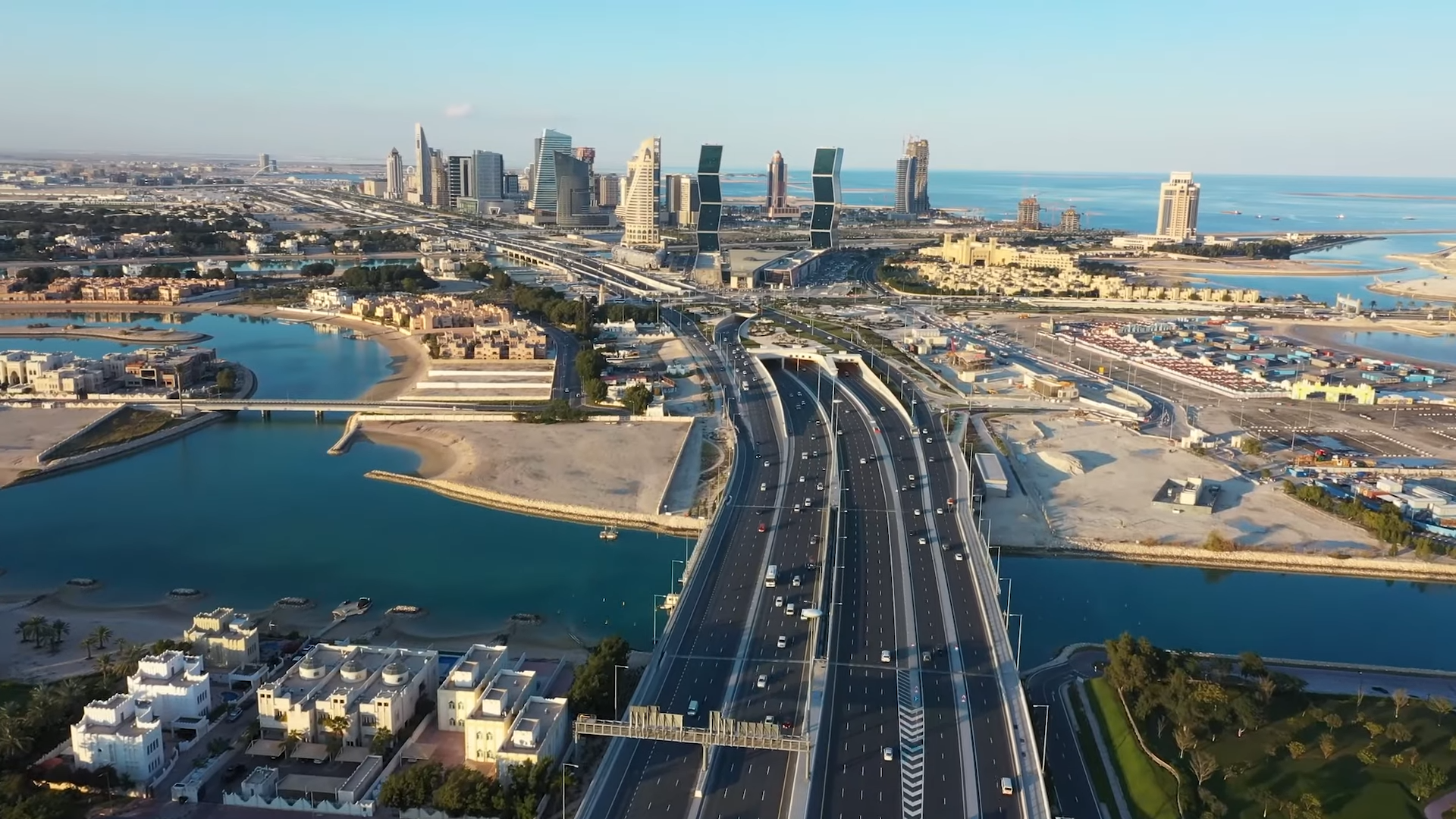
Aerial view of Lusail Expressway

The Lusail Expressway serves as an arterial road in the Doha Metropolitan Area, linking the capital Doha and the rapidly-growing Lusail City while also providing access to numerous public destinations. These include The Pearl Island development in northern Doha, the cultural hub of Katara Cultural Village, the central business district of West Bay, and a plethora of residential communities, hotels, shopping malls, and other amenities.

Spanning 5.5 kilometers from Lusail in the north to the West Bay area in the south, the expressway's design incorporates three multi-level interchanges. The main carriageway comprises four lanes in each direction, complemented by an extensive network of feeder service roads. The road includes 6.5 kilometers of dedicated pathways for pedestrians and cyclists, separate from the main thoroughfare. Constructed at a total cost of nearly $5 billion Qatari riyals, the Lusail Expressway project was undertaken by Hyundai Engineering & Construction, with CDM Smith serving as the consulting firm. The project was started on May 21, 2012, and was completed in late 2020.

Key interchanges include:

- The Arch Interchange features a three-level design, encompassing an at-grade signalized intersection, an underpass, and a flyover.
- The Al Gassar Interchange boasts a four-level configuration, including an at-grade signalized intersection, an underpass, a tunnel, and a flyover.
- The Pearl Interchange comprises three levels, with an at-grade signalized intersection, an underpass, and a flyover.

Additionally, as part of the construction project, two sea bridges were constructed near The Pearl and Lusail, further enhancing connectivity. The North Canal Crossing Bridge spans six lanes in each direction, providing direct access to the Lusail City development and the northern regions of Qatar from Doha, while the South Canal Crossing Bridge, located between the Onaiza and Pearl Intersections, accommodates eight lanes in each direction.

=== Dukhan Highway ===
Doha is linked to the country's western settlements, namely Dukhan, through Dukhan Highway. The Public Works Authority carried out the Dukhan Highway Central Project in 2017 to enhance the road network.

=== Salwa Highway ===
Completed in 1970, the Salwa Highway was the first road to link both the southern part of Qatar, including Al Karaana, and the bordering country of Saudi Arabia, to Qatar. The highway spans 95 kilometers in length, connecting the Doha Industrial Area with the town of Salwa, Saudi Arabia. The Salwa Highway features a dual four-lane carriageway system complemented by 11 strategically placed interchanges bridges. These bridge structures encompass two-span and four-span configurations tailored to the specific requirements of each location, with Interchanges 29, 35, 51, 62, and 84 adhering to the diamond configuration, while Interchange 42 was constructed in a trumpet configuration. The road was redeveloped in a project launched in July 2003 by the Public Works Authority (Ashghal) to fulfill the interim traffic requirements for the 2006 Asian Games held in Doha. This redevelopment project was completed in December 2008.

=== F-Ring Road ===
F-Ring Road is the sixth ring road in Doha. It is a thoroughfare connecting Rawdat Al Khail Street to Al Matar Street, facilitating access to the New Doha International Airport and establishing a direct route to the southern districts of Doha. Spanning a length of 8.7 kilometers, the expressway consists of six to eight lanes, delineated by a central median, with accompanying ramps and service roads at junctions. Noteworthy features include two interchanges at Al Matar Street and Najma Street Extension, both requiring the construction of bridges. Two-lane frontage roads run parallel with the primary carriageway to accommodate local traffic movement.

The road bridges crucial gaps between Musaimeer Street and the primary route leading to Al Wakrah, facilitating swift transit to and from the New Doha International Airport and the Industrial Area.

Outlined as part of the Expressway Programme, the F-Ring Road project was completed for 837,000,000 Qatari Riyals. Construction commenced on 1 April 2011, and it reached completion in the fourth quarter of 2014. Undertaken by a joint venture between construction companies Teyseer and Consolidated Contractors Company, the project's design consultation was overseen by Parsons International and Dar Al-Handasah.

=== G-Ring Road ===
The G-Ring Road spans 22 kilometers from Hamad International Airport to the south of the Doha Industrial Area. It features five lanes in each direction alongside 48 kilometers of lanes designated for pedestrians and cyclists, all bordered by landscaping. Construction of this road began in December 2013, finishing in the last quarter of 2019 at a total cost exceeding 4 billion Qatari riyals.

This road is a crucial aspect of Qatar's expressway network, facilitating uninterrupted traffic flow and significantly improving traffic movement in the country's southern regions.

Key interchanges include:

- Al Bahyia Interchange: This interchange connects the New Industrial Area and the Logistic Village at Al Wukair, offering an alternative route from Salwa Road.
- Bu Silla Interchange: This interchange links the New Industrial Area and the Logistic Village at Al Wukair, providing an additional route to the Industrial Area.
- Aba Al Seleel Interchange: This interchange improves connectivity between the Orbital Highway and the Industrial Area, connecting it with Hamad International Airport, Hamad Port, and the Abu Samra Border Crossing.
- Al Hefain Interchange: Improves connection between the East Industrial Road and Al Aziziya Street Extension.
- Jerry Musabbeh Interchange: Improves connectivity of Al Wakrah and Al Wukair with northward regions.
- Umm Beshr Interchange: Provides alternative routes to reach Hamad International Airport without entering the Al Wakrah Main Road.
- Al Thumama Interchange: This interchange improves the connection between Al Wakrah, Al Wukair, F-Ring Road, Al Thumama, and the Old Airport.
- Airport Interchange: This improves the connection of Al Wakrah and Al Wukair with Hamad International Airport and other areas.

=== Industrial Area Road ===
The Industrial Area Road is a dual carriageway spanning 12.5 kilometers and features five main multi-level interchanges. Positioned south of the Doha Industrial Area, it extends from the East Street 33 Intersection to the Bu Hamour Intersection (also known as the Al Jazeera Interchange on F-Ring Road), covering a distance of 12.5 kilometers with four lanes in each direction. The project incorporates the development of 30 kilometers of pedestrian and cycling lanes to enhance accessibility.

Among its notable features are the five main multi-level interchanges strategically placed along the route. These interchanges include the East Street 33 Intersection, Umm Al Seneem Intersection, Wadi Lubara Intersection, Messaimeer Intersection, and Bu Hamour Intersection. Each interchange is equipped with various features such as at-grade signalized intersections, underpasses, and flyovers. Additionally, the project encompasses the construction of the Barwa City Directional Tunnel, a unidirectional tunnel spanning 650 meters in length. The Industrial Area Road falls under the Expressway Programme, with a total cost of over 2.3 billion Qatari riyals. Construction commenced on July 15, 2012, and was completed in early 2019. Al Jaber Transport & General Contracting oversaw the construction, while Parsons International Limited provided consulting services.

== Taxis ==
The state-owned Mowasalat company was founded in 2004 to run the country's public transportation. It operates all taxis in Qatar under the "Karwa" brand, with thousands of taxis in the capital. Taxi stands are usually found near malls and shopping centers. In the past difficulties arose in finding Karwa taxis due to the small number of taxis available at launch, which gradually replaced all privately owned taxis.

Fares start at 10 riyals(25Qar from the airport) and the majority of taxis are sedans such as the Toyota Camry and Škoda Octavias. Most airport taxis at the Doha International Airport are Ford Freestars.

== Bus networks ==
=== Public bus network ===
An extensive bus system solely operated by the state-owned Mowasalat commenced in October 2004. It runs in the city of Doha and most of the major towns with one route that terminates as far as the Saudi border. The system covers many areas of the capital city with varied bus stop configurations ranging from open stops to semi-covered and enclosed. The system is mainly used by lower-income segments as the network connectivity is not always feasible and most buses route to the main bus stop - which in itself is a semi-covered non-air conditioned space. This clubbed with the fact that most people prefer to use their private vehicles has not led to a major shift of the city's population to public networks. However, the Doha metro is expected to change that.

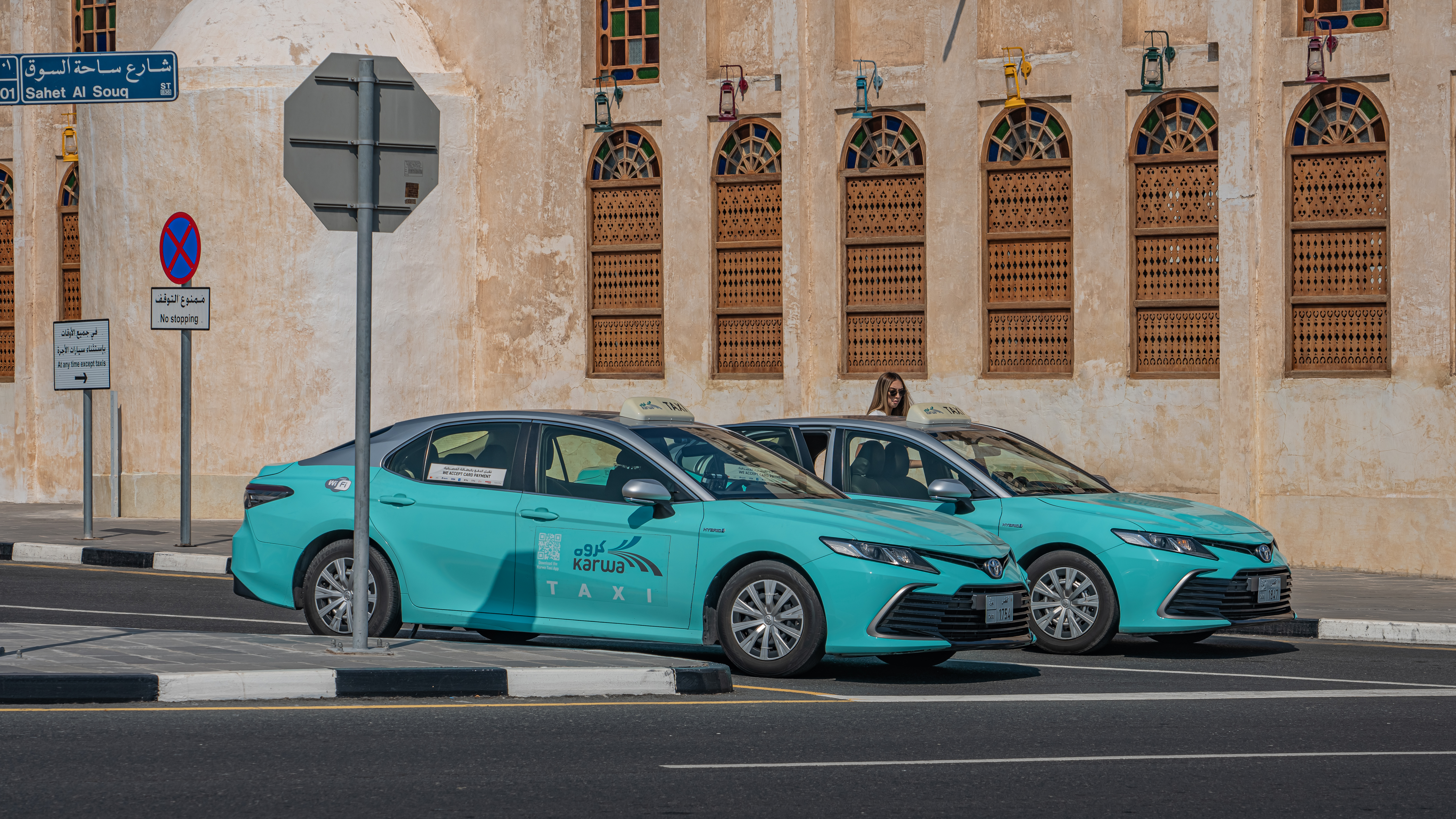
Karwa taxis in Doha

The main bus terminal is located in the Souqs area of downtown Doha with services operating to all major towns in Qatar. Mowasalat operates a total of 50 routes starting as early as 4am with last buses timed to depart around 11pm. It also offers three routes that cover major stops terminating at the new Hamad International airport in Doha. The fleet also has buses that run on natural gas, having launched the region's first CNG-fuelled buses. Mowasalat also provides transportation for public schools with a fleet of over 1800 buses. The company states that it plans to expand nationwide through six major bus stations, 16 depots and 1000 buses by 2020.

=== Shuttle network (West bay) ===
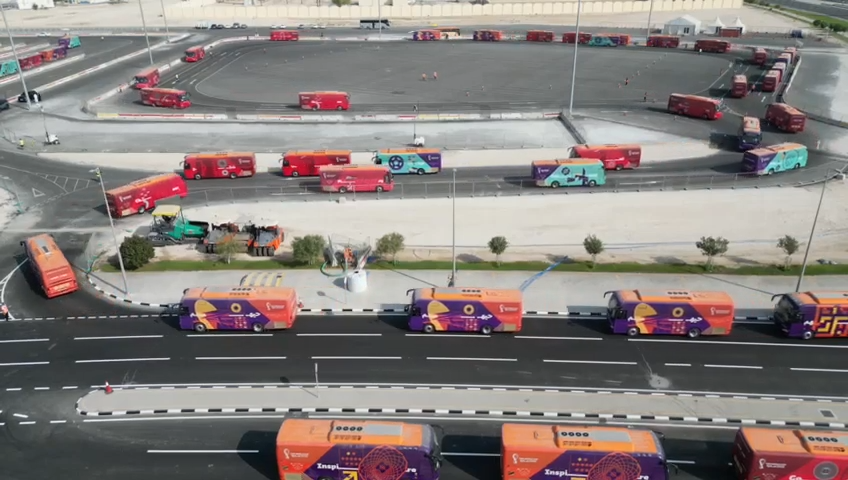
Shuttle buses during the 2022 FIFA World Cup

Qatar's Ministry of Transport launched this shuttle service for the West Bay district to help ease congestion in this business district. It has been operated by state-owned transport company, Mowasalat. It provides a transport choice for tourists and residents alike and was expanded in 2016 to cover more areas in the district. The single route network operates from 6 am to 9 pm with a frequency of 15 minutes. Initially launched as a free service with two lines, both the blue line and the red line have been combined into a single route pay and use facility. The route was introduced with the objective to ease the parking challenges in the congested district which houses Ministries, government organizations, corporate towers, hotels, embassies & sports clubs.

Some landmarks covered along the route include, Khalifa International Tennis and Squash Complex, The Doha Exhibition and Convention Center (DECC), Dafna Towers, Ministry of Justice tower, Public Works Authority (Ashghal) buildings, Sheraton grand Doha resort and convention center, City Center shopping mall, General Post office building and several government ministries towers.

=== Tourist network (Doha Bus) ===
Doha Bus is a private operated hop on hop off service established in the spring of 2013. The network has a fleet of double-decker buses and has been designed to provide a flexible approach to discovery the capital. The major interest points covered on these routes include;

- Souq Waqif (traditional market)

- Museum of Islamic art

- Katara Cultural Village

- Pearl Island

- Education city (Qatar Foundation)

- City center (major shopping mall)

- Grand Mosque

- Doha Corniche (water front promenade)

- Qatar National Convention Center

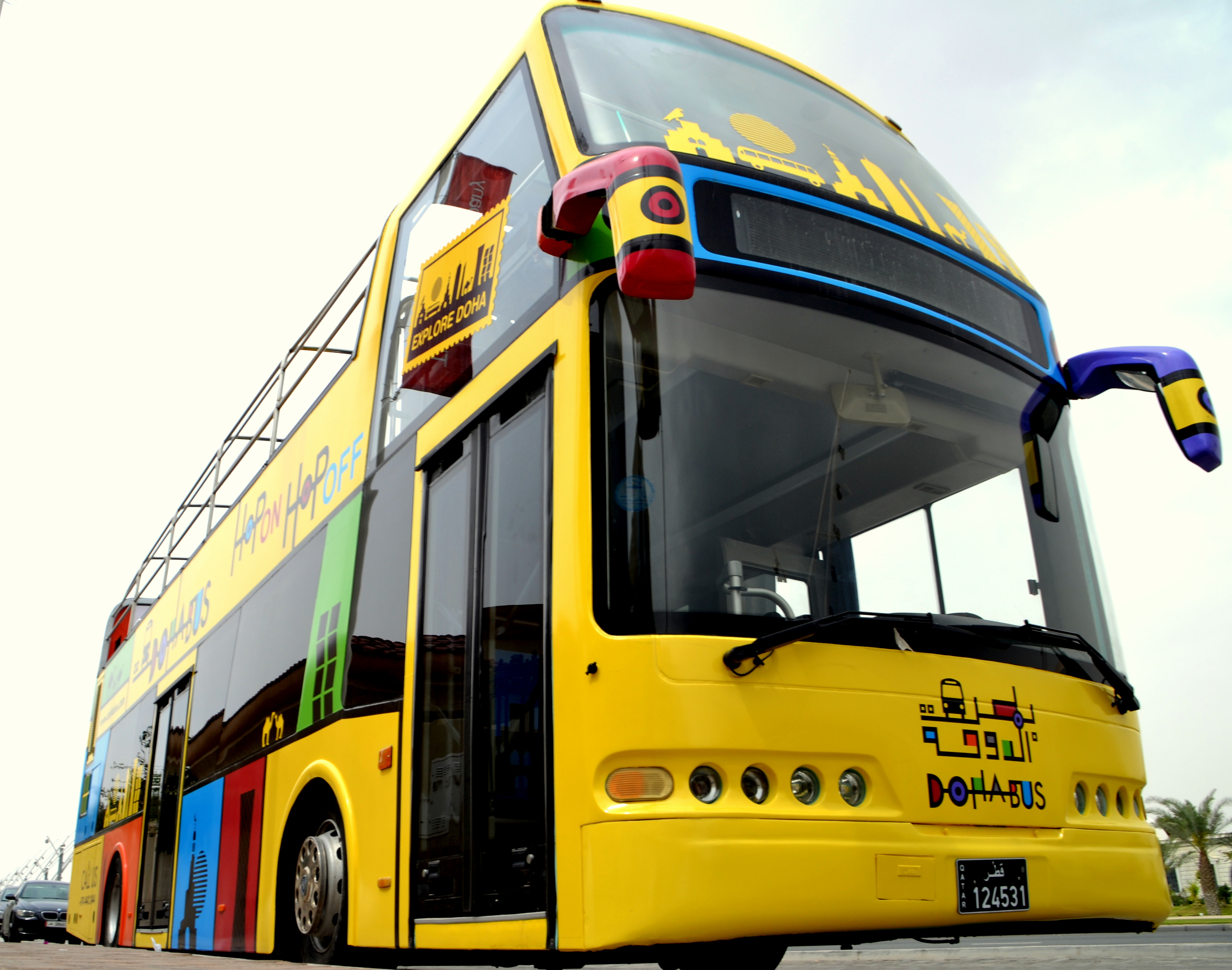
Open-top double-decker buses used only for sightseeing. It covers over 22 stops focusing only on areas of tourist interest.

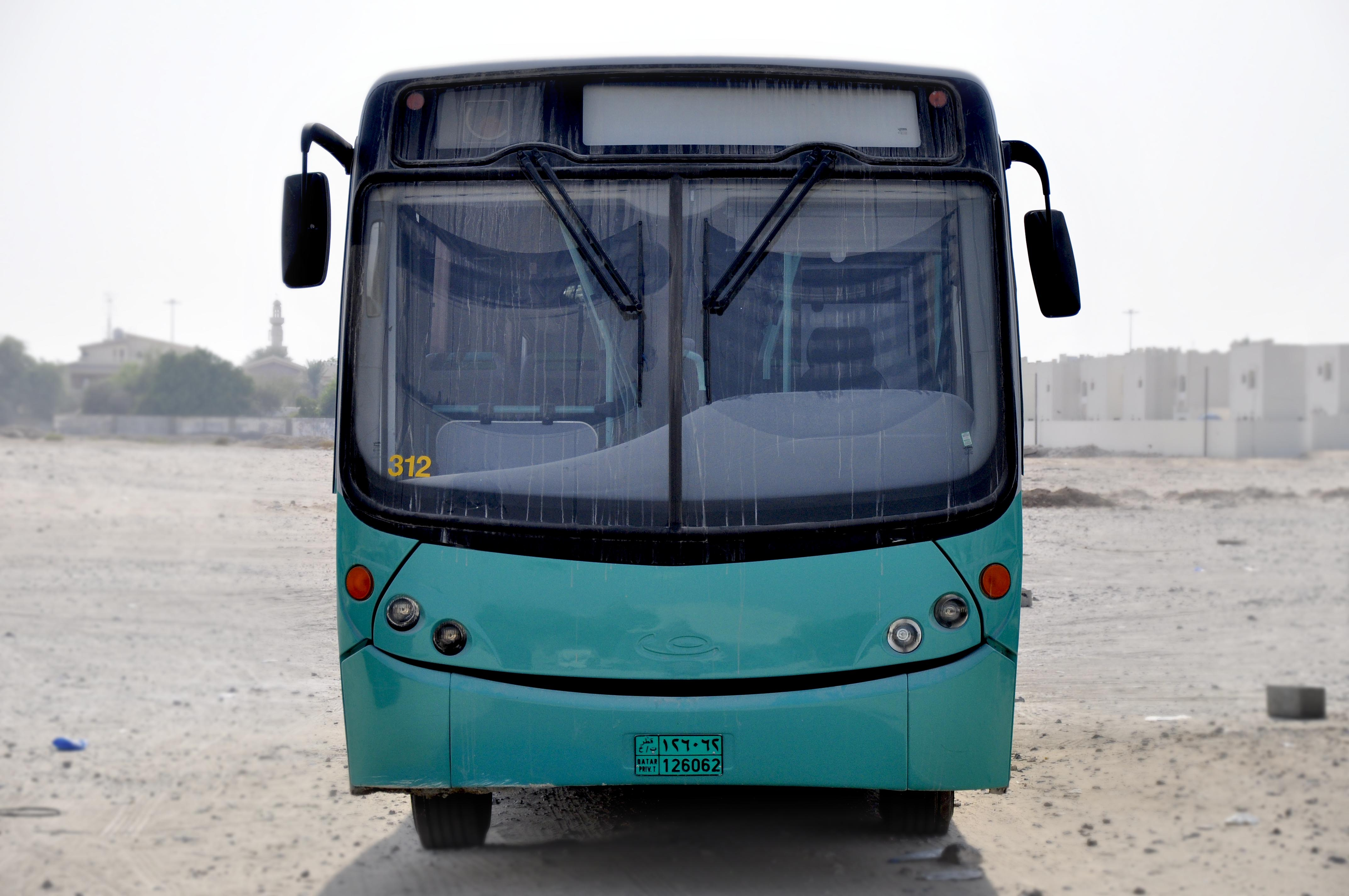
The public bus network 'Mowasalat' operational since 2004 now covers around 50 routes inclusive of all of Qatar's towns.

== Railways ==
The Qatar Integrated Railway Project covers four metro lines in Doha, tram routes in West Bay and Lusail, a high-speed line, and dedicated freight railways.

=== Doha Metro ===
The first line to open, the Red Line, opened on 8 May 2019 for travel from al Qassar station to al Wakra (13 stations).

A four-line, 300-kilometer (190 mi) metro is under construction. Construction work on the Msheireb station—planned as the system hub— began on October 10, 2012. The system will include commuter lines, four light rail lines, and a people mover. In August Qatar Rail signed five contracts totaling 1.48 billion riyals for work on the first phase of the metro, which covers 129 route-kilometers including the Red, Green, and Gold lines. The contracts were awarded to Porr/Saudi Binladin/HBK Contracting (enabling works), Jacobs Engineering (Red Line), Louis Berger/Egis Group (Gold Line and main stations), Hill International (Green Line), and Lloyd's Register (safety assessment). According to the CEO of Qatar Rail, Phase 1 is due to open in the fourth quarter of 2019, well ahead of the 2022 FIFA World Cup.

Overall, Doha Metro will consist of four lines: in addition to the Red Line, the Gold Line and the Green Line will be built in the first phase; the Blue Line is expected to be completed in the second phase. Msheireb Station will be the point of intersection for all of the metro lines.

The Red Line (also known as Coast Line) will extend through Doha, running from Al Wakrah to Al Khor. It is separated into two divisions: Red Line North and Red Line South. The former will run from Mushayrib Station to Al Khor City, over a length of 55.7 km. Doha Metro's Green Line will connect Doha to Education City and is also known as the Education Line. Starting in Old Airport, the Gold Line (also known as Historic Line) will end in Al Rayyan and cover a distance of 30.6 km. Lastly, the Blue Line, or City Line, will only cover the city of Doha, and is planned to be circular with a length of 17.5 km.

=== Lusail Tram ===
The city of Lusail, which is located approximately 15 km (9.3 mi) north of Doha's city center, is getting a light rail transit system comprising 25 stations over 19 km (12 mi). It will connect to the Doha metro. The opening of the Lusail Tram is expected for 2020.

=== Msheireb Tram ===
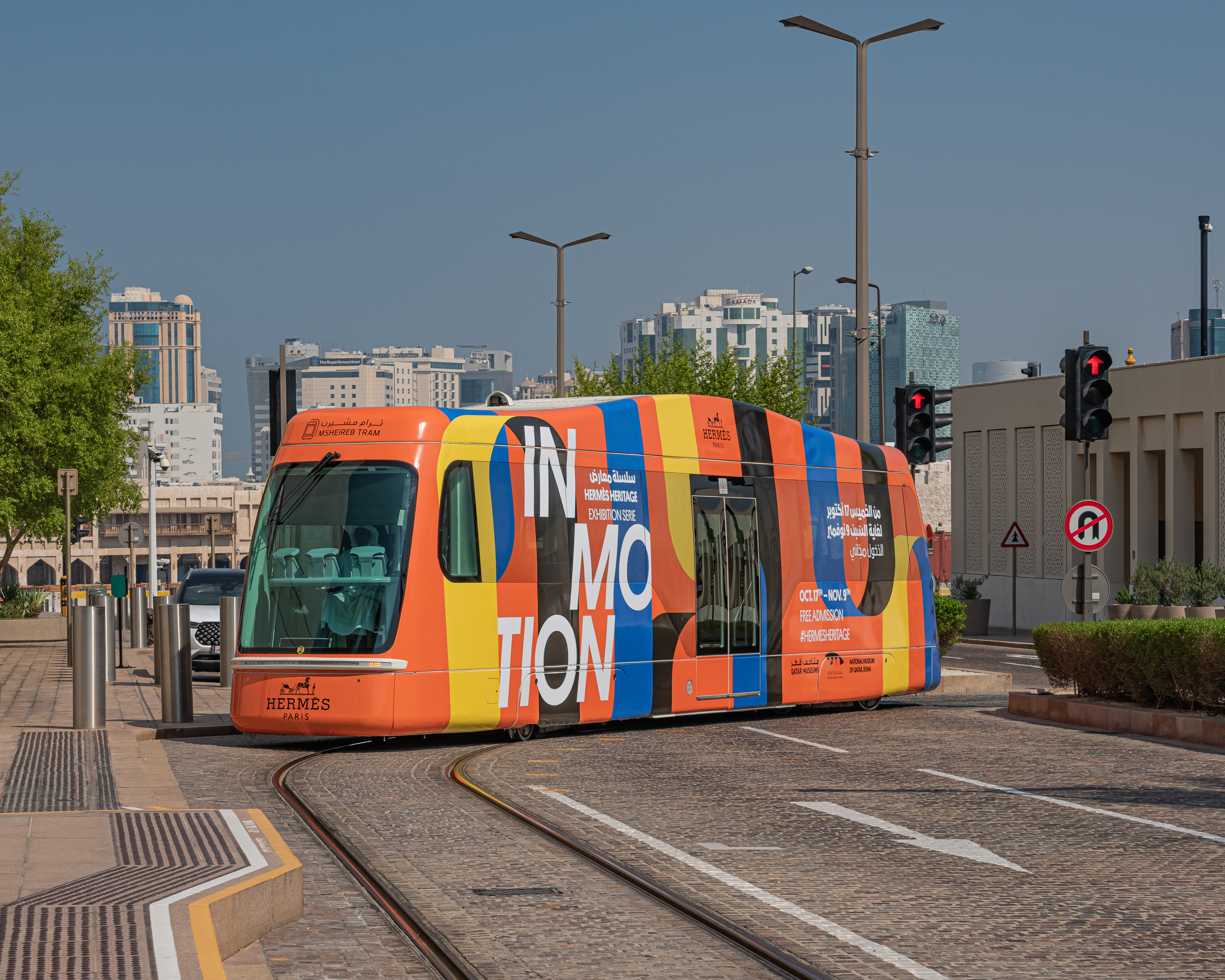
Msheireb Tram in Doha

As a part of the design of Msheireb Downtown, a planned settlement in Doha, the Msheireb Tram was constructed and opened in December 2019. The system has a length of 2.12 km and 9 stops.

=== West Bay Tram ===
Doha's West Bay neighborhood was supposed to get a transit system, an 11.5 km (7.1 mi) catenary-free tramway, but these ideas have been scrapped. The Education City tram turnkey-system, constructed by Siemens, utilizes its latest Avenio tramcars with supercapacitor technology, was opened on 24 December 2019.

=== Gulf Railway ===
The Gulf Railway is a proposed railway project that would connect the six Arab member states of the Gulf Cooperation Council (GCC)—Bahrain, Kuwait, Oman, Qatar, Saudi Arabia, United Arab Emirates—of the Persian Gulf. The regional network would be 1,940 kilometers (1,210 mi) long. It is planned to be operational by 2017. A monorail system is expected to be the first to open, and will carry passengers between Bahrain and Saudi Arabia. According to initial planning documents, the metro lines will be mostly underground, which could be a challenge for engineers due to the high water table.

== Aviation ==
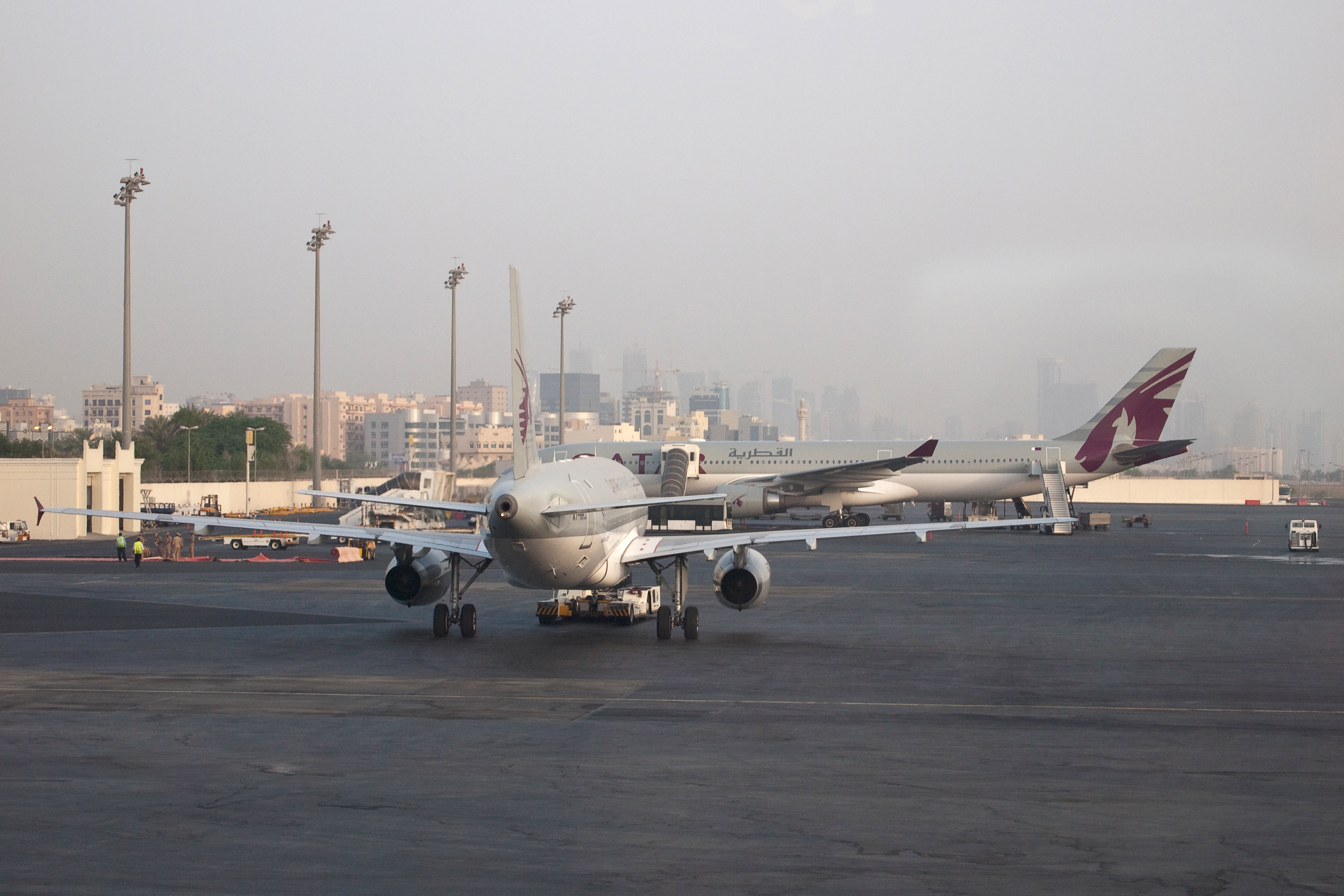
Aircraft parking bay at the former Doha International Airport

Doha International Airport was Qatar's international airport until 2014. It was the hub of Qatar Airways, and was also served by many other international airlines. Because of the rapid growth in Qatar and the rapid growth of Qatar Airways, the airport was deemed too small and inadequate for the traffic that went through. This problem was addressed with a large expansion that was made in anticipation of the 15th Asian Games. The airport's facilities were expanded significantly, including the construction of a separate first and business class terminal. Furthermore, parking bays had been constructed on the opposite side of the runway to handle additional air traffic. All these changes had temporarily eased the problem but because of the airport's small size and limited space for expansion, it was not effective to permanently solve the crowding problem.

Hamad International Airport, located about 4 km to the east of the former airport, replaced it as the only International airport in Qatar. This airport has been partially built out at sea on 60% reclaimed land. Next to the airport 100 hectares have been set aside for an Airport City. Commenced in 2006, the initial phases of the airport are completed and the third phase is ongoing. It received its first passengers in 2014 and when completed it will be able to accommodate around 50 million passengers annually. The new airport is located on the shore, further away from the central areas of the city than the current airport, reducing noise and environmental pollution. Two parallel runways are operational, the western one being the eighth longest in the world at 4850 meters. The airport's 600,000 sq m passenger terminal has a check-in hall that comprises a 25,000 sq m column-free space with around 130 check-in counters. One of the largest maintenance hangars worldwide is located at the airport said to be able to cater to 13 aircraft at once. This airport is also one of the first ever designed specifically for the double-deck Airbus A380.

== See also ==
- Transport in Qatar
