= Zone 56, Qatar =

Zone 56
- Zone
- Interactive map of Zone 56
- Coordinates: 25.212938°N 51.489964°E
- Country: Qatar
- Municipality: Al Rayyan
- Blocks: 280

Area
  - Total: 82.4 km^{2} (31.8 sq mi)

Population
  - Total: 283,675 (2,015)
- Time zone: UTC+03 (Arabia Standard Time)
- ISO 3166 code: QA-RA

Zone 56 is a zone of the municipality of Al Rayyan in the state of Qatar. The main districts recorded in the 2015 population census were Fereej Al Asiri, New Fereej Al Khulaifat, Bu Samra, Al Mamoura, Abu Hamour, Mesaimeer, and Ain Khaled.

Other districts which fall within its administrative boundaries are Labour City and Umm Al Seneem.

== Demographics ==
Year	Population
1986	4,063
1997	15,563
2004	29,383
2010	73,270
2015	128,928

== Land use ==
The Ministry of Municipality and Environment (MME) breaks down land use in the zone as follows.

Area (km^{2})	Developed land (km^{2})	Undeveloped land (km^{2})	Residential (km^{2})	Commercial/ Industrial (km^{2})	Education/ Health (km^{2})	Farming/ Green areas (km^{2})	Other uses (km^{2})
61.14	38.00	23.14	10.94	1.90	1.33	0.16	23.67
