= Louis Berger Group =

Engineering consulting company

WSP (Louis Berger)
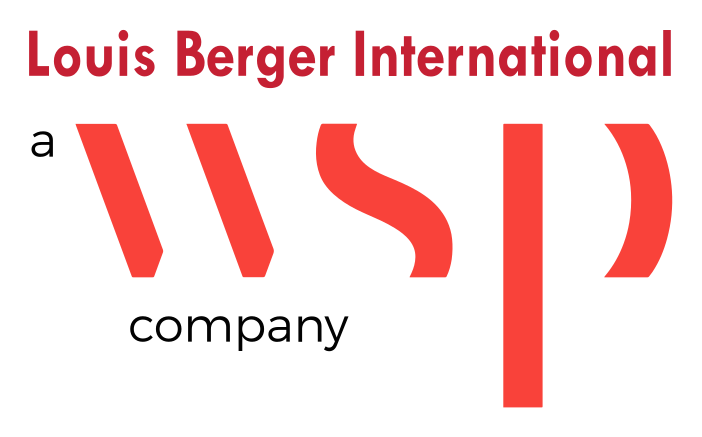
- Type: Private
- Industry: Engineering, architecture, economic development, environmental science, transportation, international development, water supply, wastewater treatment, program management
- Founded: 1953 (Harrisburg, Pennsylvania)
- Founder: Louis Berger
- Headquarters: Morristown, New Jersey
- Area served: worldwide
- Key people: Jim Stamatis (president and CEO)
- Services: Civil engineering, structural engineering, program management, construction management, architecture, cultural resources management, public administration
- Number of employees: 6,000
- Website: Louis Berger

Louis Berger (formerly known as Berger Group Holdings) is a full-service engineering, architecture, planning, environmental, program and construction management and economic development firm based in Morristown, New Jersey. Founded in 1953 in Harrisburg, Pennsylvania by Dr. Louis Berger, the firm employed nearly 6,000 employees in more than 50 countries worldwide. The company was acquired by WSP Global in 2018.

The firm provides services to federal, state and local government clients, as well as to international multilateral institutions and to commercial industry. As of September 2011, Louis Berger ranked as the third largest USAID private-sector partner, and was ranked #25 in 2015 among U.S. design firms in terms of total firm revenue by Engineering News-Record.

The company has suffered setbacks in recent years with settlement of fraud charges for contracts in Afghanistan; admission of criminal responsibility to Foreign Corrupt Practices Act violations in a settlement with the US Department of Justice for bribery of governments in Asia; and a debarment by the World Bank for corrupt practices. In 2019, the National Transportation Safety Board determined that Louis Berger's inadequate peer review of the design contributed to the Florida International University pedestrian bridge collapse. They were also criticized for failure to identify the significance of structural cracking and not preparing a remedial plan to address it.

== History ==
=== Background ===
Louis Berger was founded in 1953 by Louis Berger in Harrisburg, Pennsylvania. Born in 1914 in Lawrence, Massachusetts, Berger graduated from Tufts College in 1936 with a degree in civil engineering, and earned a master’s in soils and geology from Massachusetts Institute of Technology in 1940. In 1942, Berger joined the United States Coast Guard; while on active duty, he designed waterfront facilities along the Mississippi River and commanded a Coast Guard base in Greenland. Upon returning from active duty, he earned his PhD in soil mechanics from Northwestern University and joined the teaching faculty at the Pennsylvania State University. In 1952, Berger left Penn State to form the engineering consulting firm that would become Louis Berger.

=== Early years ===
The firm’s first major projects included design on the Pennsylvania Turnpike, the first turnpike in the U.S., and on I-80 between Denville and Netcong, the first interstate road in the state of New Jersey.

Louis Berger logo before its purchase by WSP

The company received its first international contract in 1959 when the firm was selected by USAID and the U.S. Army Corps of Engineers Gulf District to design a 435-mile highway between Yangon and Mandalay in Myanmar. The project was initially rejected by the Burmese government as proposed by the Corps of Engineers, but Louis Berger was able to design the project using more economical alternatives.

The firm designed the Herat-Islam Qala Highway in Afghanistan in 1965.

In 2007, Fredric S. Berger, son of the founder, took over as chairman of Louis Berger Group from 2007; he would serve in the job until his death in April 2015. Berger, who became involved with the company in 1972, held a bachelor's degree in economics from Tufts University and a master of science degree in civil engineering from the Massachusetts Institute of Technology. A founding member of the American University of Afghanistan, he would serve on the university's board from 2004 to 2015; he would in 2013 be appointed to advisory boards for the U.S. Institute of Peace and the U.S. Trade and Development Agency.

In December 2010, the Discovery Science Channel production team filmed thirty hours of footage of the works for the construction of a new bridge over the Sava River in Belgrade, Serbia.

In 2012, Louis Berger completed work on the Juba-Nimule Road in South Sudan under the Sudan Infrastructure Services Project. The road was the first paved highway in South Sudan and links the South Sudanese capital to the town of Nimule on the Ugandan border.

In 2016, the firm acquired the architecture and engineering firm of Ammann & Whitney.

== Organization ==
Louis Berger consists of three operating companies which include a United States unit (formerly known as Louis Berger Group), an international unit, and a services unit that provides base logistics and operations support, global operations and maintenance, turnkey power solutions and fueling and facility services. Headquartered in Morristown, New Jersey, Louis Berger manages its regional operations out of offices in Washington D.C., France, United Arab Emirates, India and Panama.

The company was acquired by the Canada-based WSP Global in 2018 for $400 million.

== Industry rankings ==
Louis Berger was ranked #25 among U.S. design firms in 2015 based on total firm revenue by Engineering News-Record and #10 among Program Management firms The firm also ranked #37 among Environmental firms in 2014.

== Criticisms ==
=== Afghanistan and Iraq ===
In November 2010, Louis Berger agreed to pay a record $69.3 million to settle charges of fraud against the government brought under the False Claims Act. The case, filed by a whistleblower, alleged that the company billed the government for internal costs unrelated to its rebuilding contracts in Afghanistan.

=== Protection payments to Taliban ===
A lawsuit filed in December 2019 in the D.C. District Court on behalf of Gold Star families alleged that Louis Berger Group and some other U.S. contractors involved in Afghanistan's reconstruction projects made illegal "protection payments" to the Taliban, funding a "Taliban-led terrorist insurgency" that killed or wounded thousands of Americans in Afghanistan. Then-Secretary of State Hillary Clinton said that the "protection money" was "one of the major sources of funding for the Taliban."

=== Bribery in India, Vietnam, Indonesia, and Kuwait ===
Between 1998 and 2010, executives at the company paid bribes amounting to $3.9 million to government officials in India, Indonesia, Vietnam, and Kuwait to win business in violation of the Foreign Corrupt Practices Act. The inquiry into the company's activities in Vietnam uncovered corrupt payments to government officials in the Third Rural Transport and Da Nang Priority Infrastructure Investment Projects, both World Bank-funded projects. In February 2015, the World Bank debarred the firm for a year for engaging in "corrupt practices". In July 2015, the company admitted criminal responsibility and agreed to pay a penalty of $17.1 million.

== Key projects ==
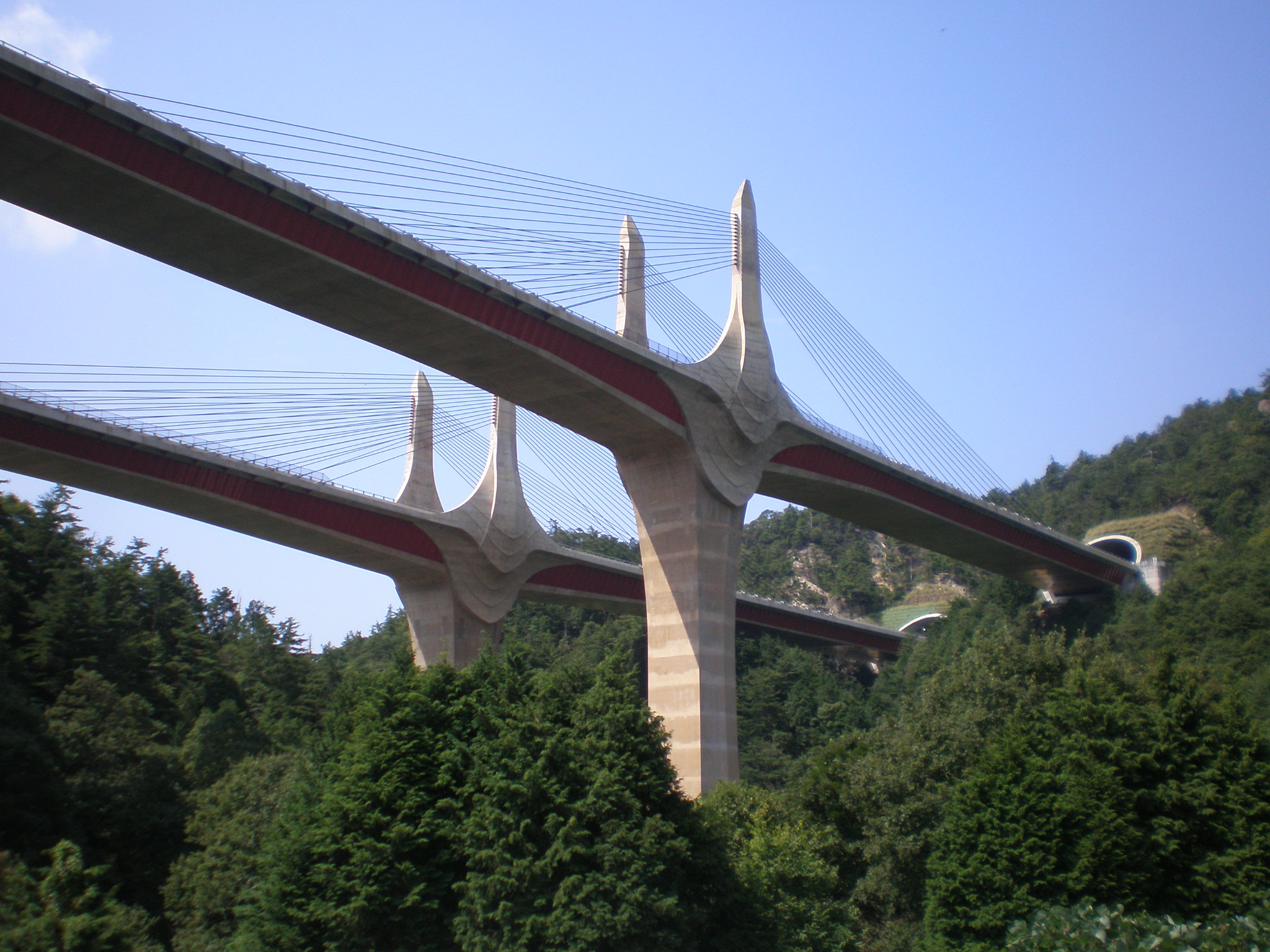
Ohmi-Ohdori Bridge, Japan

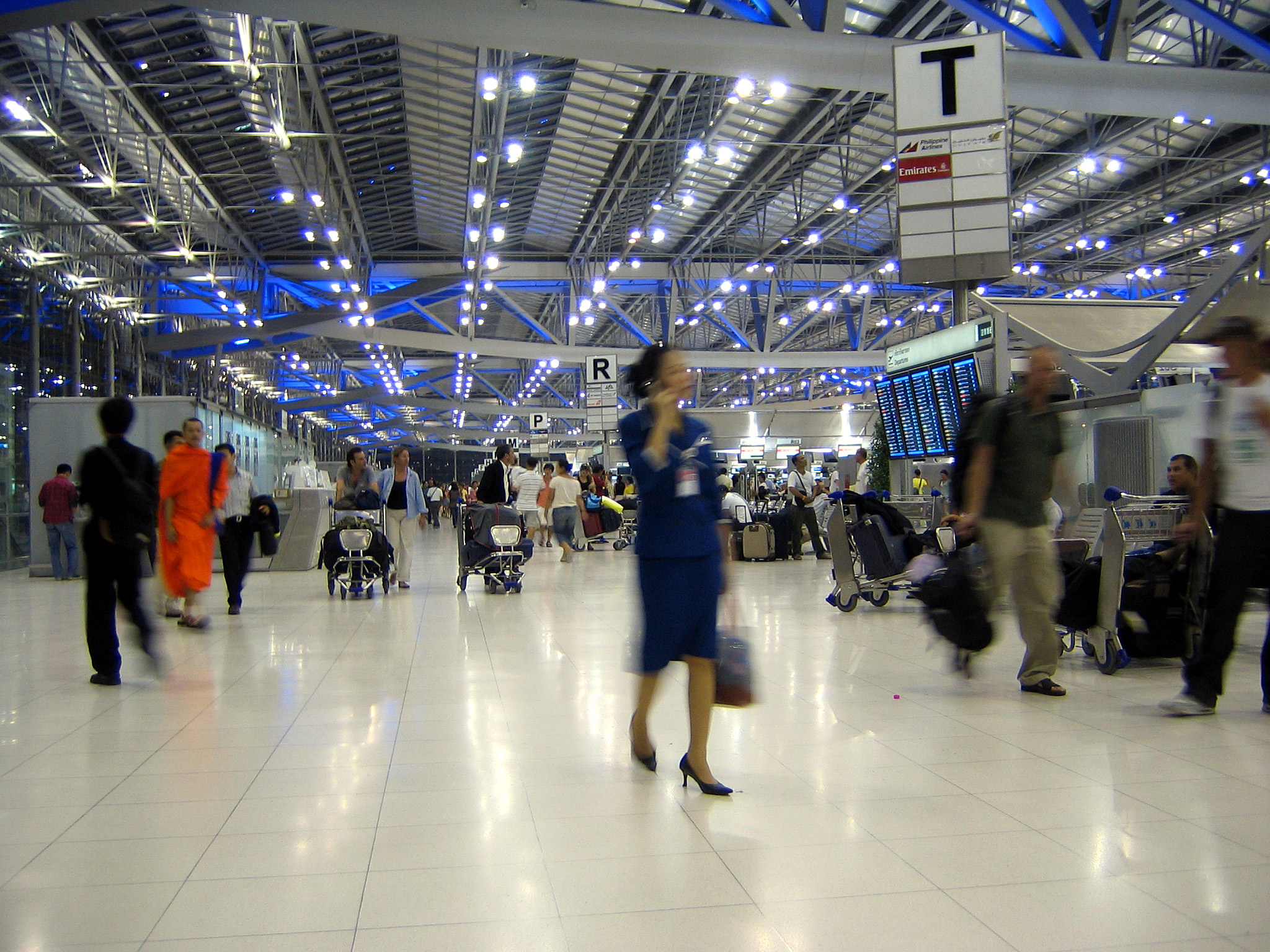
Suvarnabhumi Airport

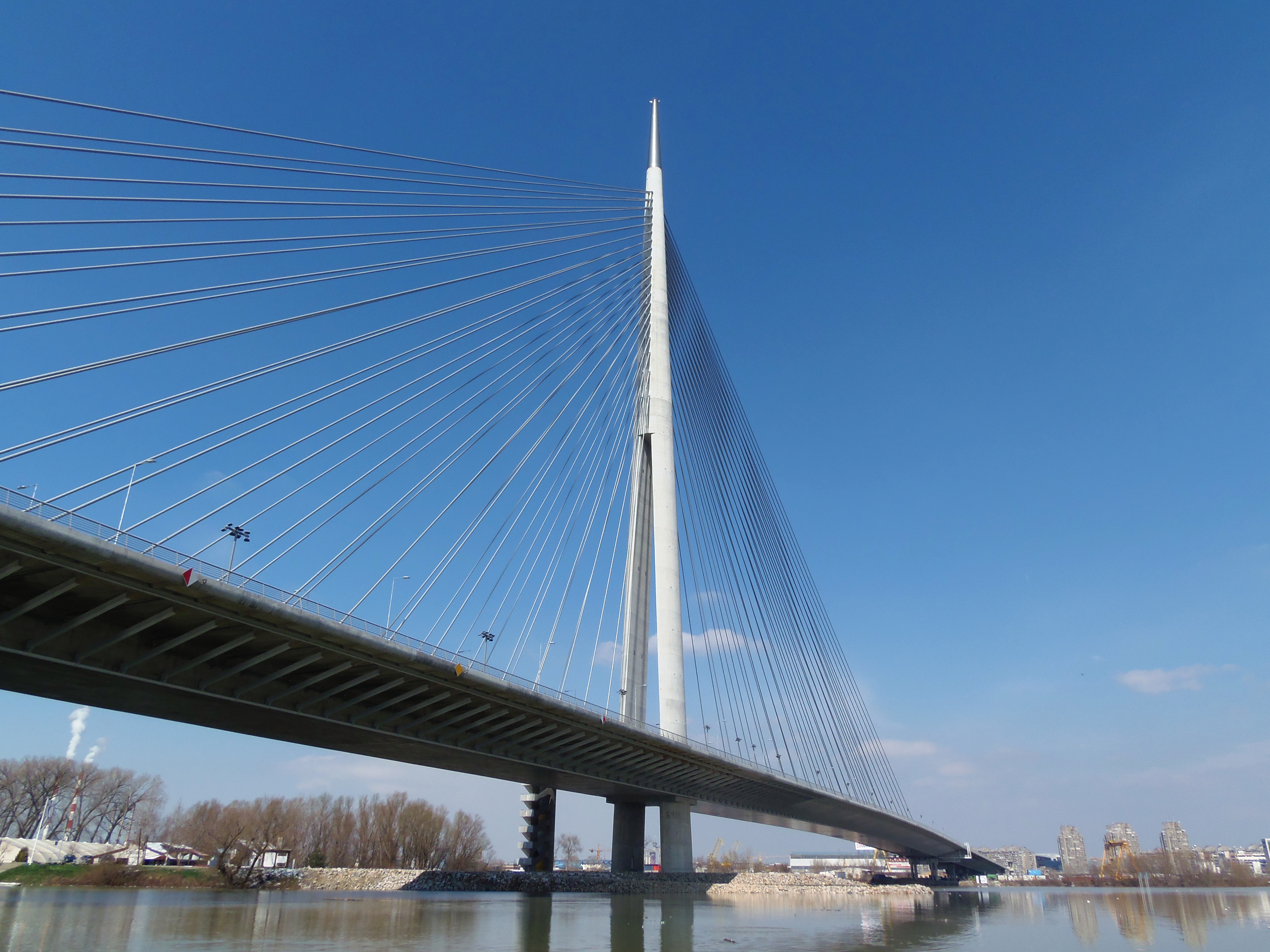
Ada Bridge

=== Roads and bridges ===
- Ada Bridge, Serbia
- Bang Na Expressway, Thailand
- Dragon River Bridge, Vietnam
- Juba-Nimule Road, South Sudan
- Kabul-Kandahar Highway, Afghanistan
- Ohmi-Odori Bridge, Japan
- Pennsylvania Turnpike, Pennsylvania
- Third Bridge over Panama Canal, Panama

=== Aviation ===
- Ovda Air Base
- Queen Alia International Airport
- Sir Seewoosagur Ramgoolam International Airport
- Suvarnabhumi Airport

=== Rail ===
- Kamalapur railway station
- MRT Blue Line
- Mumbai Monorail
- North South Railway (Saudi Arabia)
- Doha Metro

=== Maritime ===
- Port at Lekki
- Port of Santos

=== Other projects ===
- Kajaki Dam
- Lincoln Memorial Reflecting Pool

== See also ==
- Hermanos Serdán International Airport
- Kabul-Kandahar Highway
- Pennsylvania Turnpike
- Third Bridge over Panama Canal
