= Transport in Qatar =

Transportation networks and infrastructure in Qatar

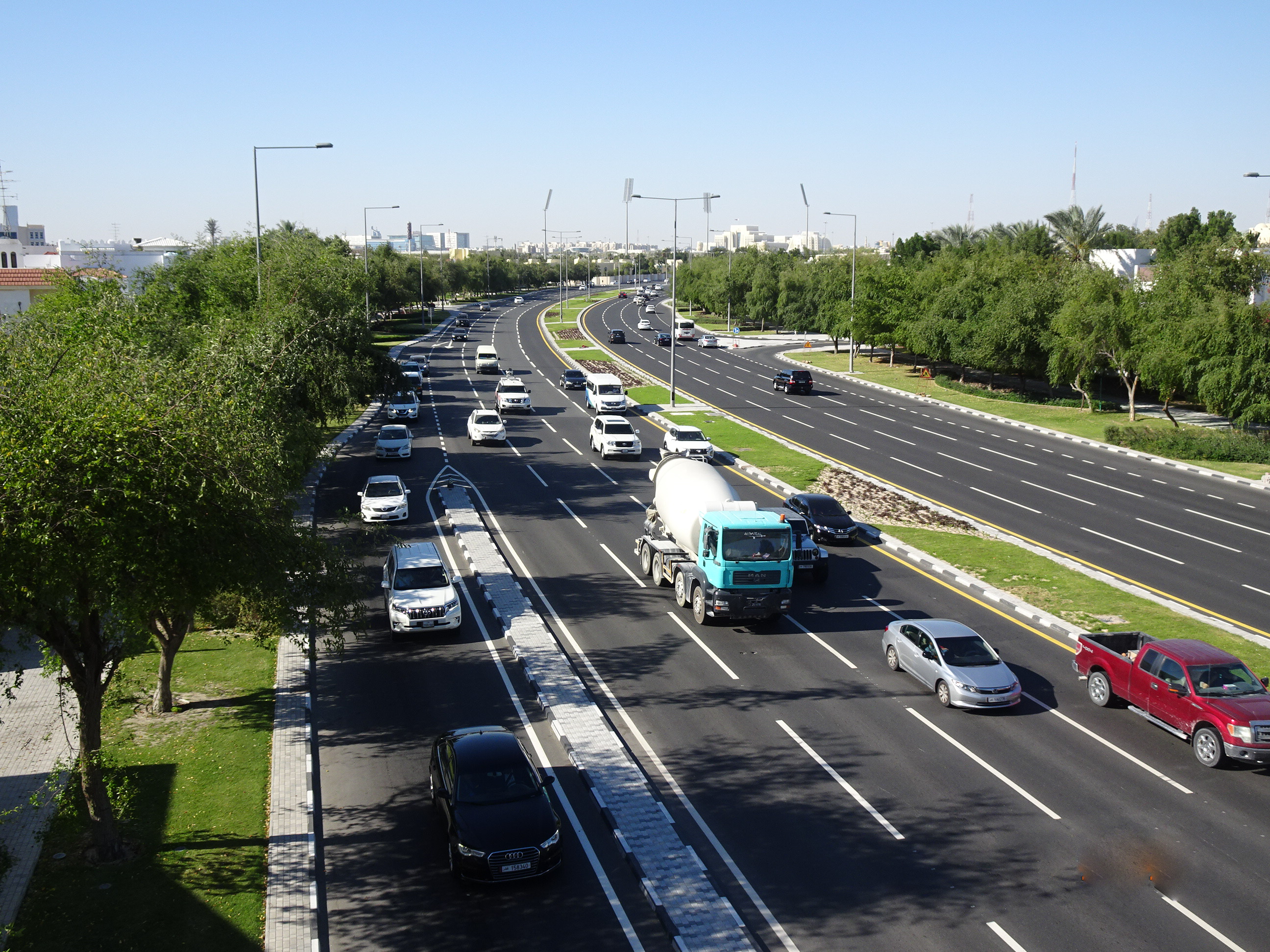
Diverging traffic in Doha

Transport in Qatar is primarily centered around the Doha Metropolitan Area (DMA), where approximately 2 million people reside and work. Doha, the capital city, serves as the national hub for government, business, and tourism, but significant development occurs outside the city as part of the government's diversification strategy.

Qatar has experienced remarkable economic and population growth in recent years, with the population surging from 1.7 million in 2008 to over 2.7 million by 2017, primarily in Greater Doha. Emerging development areas outside of Doha include Lusail and Al Wakrah, as well as recently established Economic and Logistic Zones. To sustain this growth, Qatar is investing in enhancing its transportation system, including constructing expressways and freeways and a comprehensive public transport system comprising the Doha Metro, Lusail Tram, and bus network upgrades.

== Government initiatives ==
=== Expressway Programme ===
The Expressway Programme aims to supply approximately 800 kilometers of secure and efficient roadways by executing over 30 projects dispersed across 46 contracts. Furthermore, the programme aims to establish an infrastructure network with modern underground utilities such as stormwater systems, electricity services, and advanced transportation systems. The initiative will also focus on enhancing the aesthetics of roads and providing better amenities for cyclists and pedestrians.

=== 2008 Transport Master Plan for Qatar (TMPQ) ===
In 2008, Qatar introduced its first Transportation Master Plan (TMPQ 2008), outlining a comprehensive strategy for land transportation, encompassing various initiatives and projects to meet current and future transport needs. In response to the evolving conditions and secondary analysis, the Ministry of Transport (MOT) updated the plan in 2017 to align with the objectives of Qatar National Vision 2030.

== Public transport ==
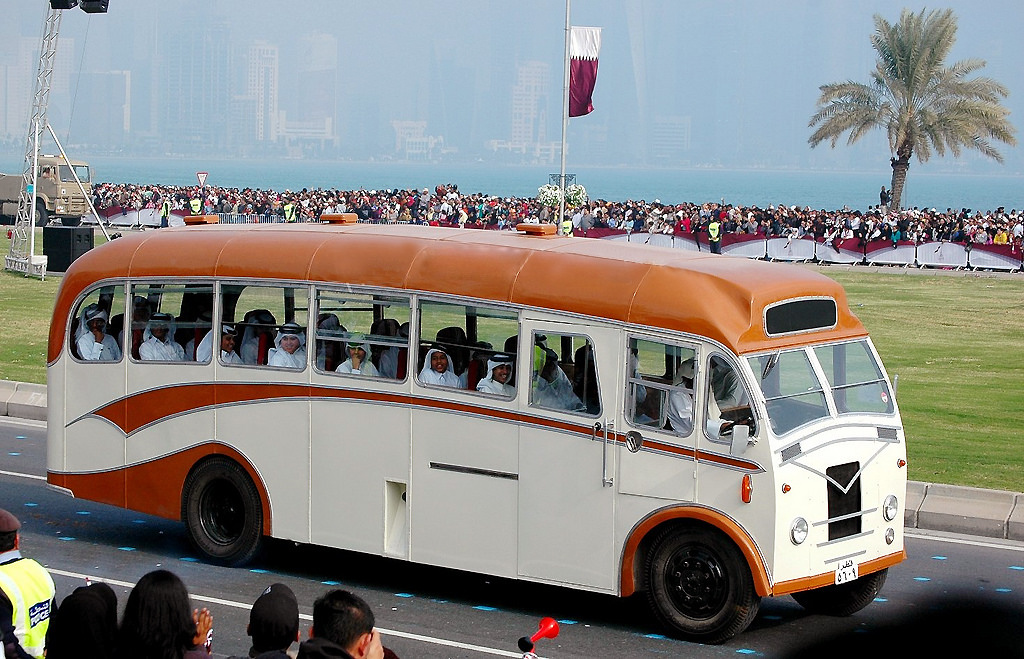
A public transit bus in a parade

In 2002, the Qatari government launched Mowasalat, a company 100% owned by the government, managed and operated by the state authorities to ensure the smooth provision of integrated ground-transport services for the entire country. Previously, 3,000 privately owned orange taxicabs used to rule the streets of Qatar but the government took them off the roads as they saw them as a threat to the new Mowasalat taxis. There has been much controversy over this move, as it is now very hard to find a taxi in Doha.

Public buses now service over 35 routes covering most locations of Doha with minimal fares making public transport in Qatar an inexpensive solution to the problems of rush hours and parking difficulties.

Mowasalat, under the brand-name Karwa, now operates more than 3,000 new taxi sedans including the recently acquired airport taxis with spacious cabins using 2007 Ford Freestars and more than 120 public buses, school buses, and private-hire coaches. In 2009, the Mowasalat created a world record for the largest parade of buses, numbering 300 in all. In addition, its Doha Limousine Service has 100 standard limousines and 200 Jaguar XJ VIP units that are mostly placed at the Doha International Airport and at major hotels. In 2021, Karwa acquired a fleet of diesel vehicles with Euro 5 standard in order to remove particulate matter from exhausts, reducing it to the equivalent of one gram of sand per kilometer driven.

However, those without personal transportation still face difficulties to move around since the number of taxis is much lower than the actual need of the population. All buses operate only on specific assigned lines based at the Central Bus Stations at the Old Al Ghanim area of the old city.

The Ministry of Transport and Communications stated that Public bus ridership has increased by 40% between 2015 and 2018.

== Railways ==
In August 2008, Qatari Diar Real Estate Investment created a joint venture with Deutsche Bahn of Germany, Qatar Railway Development Company to plan a railway network in Qatar. On 22 November 2009, Deutsche Bahn and Qatari signed a memorandum of Agreement to build high-speed railway lines and underground transport networks in Qatar and Bahrain. This agreement has never been executed.

The Qatar Railways Development Company (QRDC) was created in 2011, and soon after it was decided that Qatar Rail would be the sole owner and manager of Qatar's rail network and would be responsible for the design, construction, commissioning, operation and maintenance of the entire rail network and systems.

In December 2025, the Qatari government signed a memorandum of understanding with the Saudi government to establish a high speed rail link between the two countries. The project had an estimated completion date of 2031.

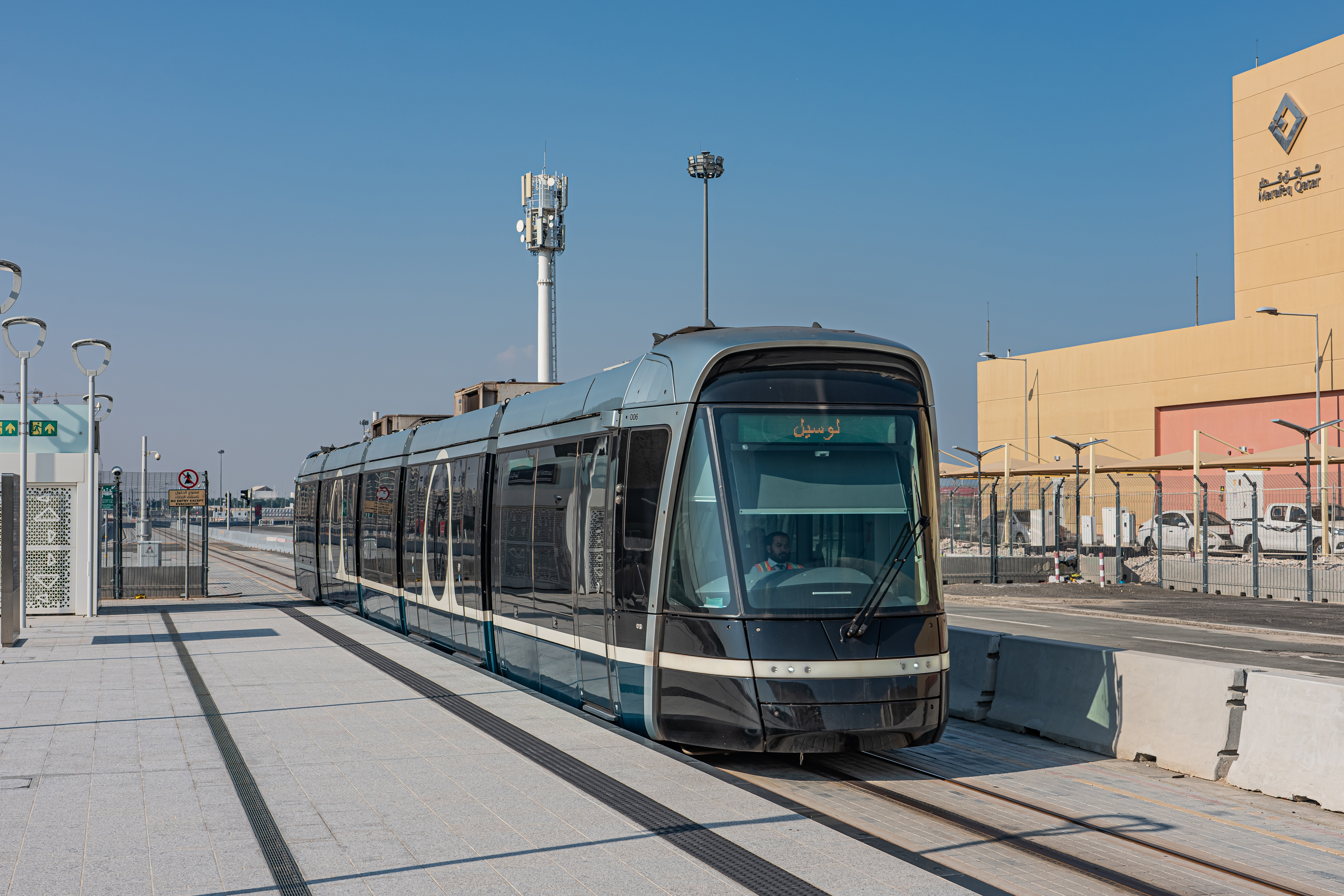
Lusail Tram

Qatar Rail consists of:

- Doha Metro (Contract awarded for civil works, Rolling Stocks and Systems).
- Lusail Tram for Lusail (the other LRT systems in Doha, namely for Education City and Hamad International Airport are managed outside Qatar Rail.
- Long Distance.

The total length of the Qatar Rail network consists of approximately:

- 750 km of track
- 100 stations for both passenger and freight

=== Doha Metro ===
In June 2013, Qatar Rail awarded four design and build contracts worth approximately $8.2 billion for phase one of the Doha metro. The project included four rail lines and an underground section in the center of the capital Doha, and links to stadiums for the 2022 FIFA World Cup soccer tournament. The contracts were for the Red Line North project, the Red Line South project, the Green Line project and another one to design and build the metro's major stations. The projects are expected to employ more than 20,000 workers at its peak, construction is scheduled to begin later this year for completion by 2019. Metro construction was originally planned to start in the first quarter of 2010.

Doha Metro's Red Line became the first line officially opened to the public on 8 May 2019. This was followed by the launch of the Gold Line on 21 November 2019, and the opening of the Green Line on 10 December 2019.

=== Standards ===
- Gauge: 1,435 mm (4 ft 8 1/2 in)
- Brakes: Air
- Couplings (freight): TBA
- Electrification: 25 kV AC

== Highways ==
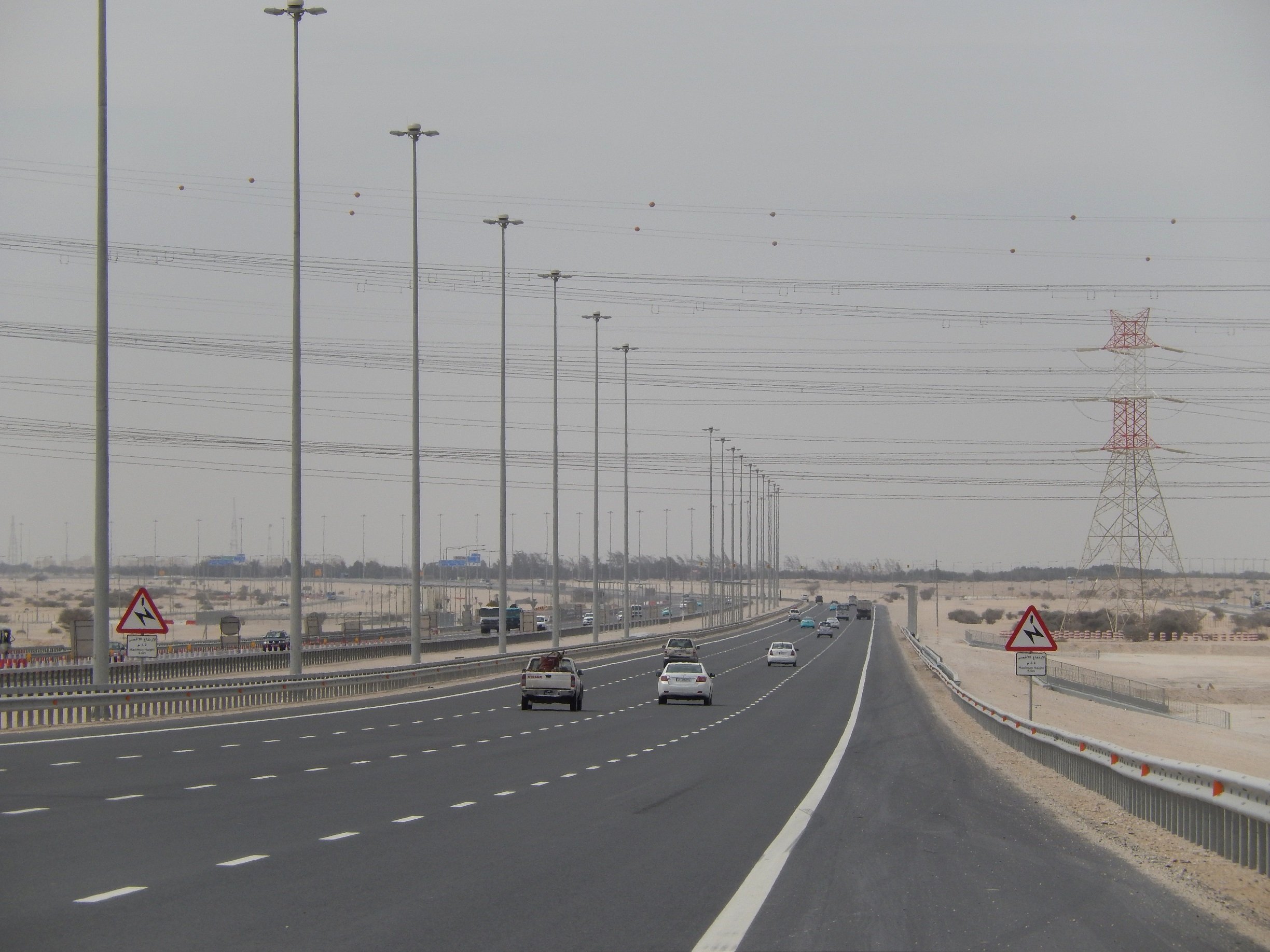
Highway Q3 (from Doha to Dukhan)

- Total: 1,230 km
- Paved: 1,107 km
- Unpaved: 123 km (1996 est.)

Most of the main roads have been updated to multilane, double carriageway motorways, including the following:

- Al Shamal Highway: Doha - Ar Ru'ays. Length: 109 km.
- Doha Highway: Doha - Mesaieed. Length: 57 km.
- Garafat Ar Rayyan Highway: Doha - Dukhan. Length: 82 km.
- Al Khor Highway: Doha - Al Khor. Length: 45 km.
- Salwa Highway (constructed in 1970): Doha - Abu Samra. Length: 100 km.
- Umm Bab Highway: Dukhan - Salwa Highway. length: 61 km.
- Al Majd Road (constructed in 2017 as the "Orbital Highway") is the longest highway in Qatar, running at a length of 195 km from south-to-north. It begins in Mesaieed and extends north towards Ras Laffan on the coast.

== Pedestrian infrastructure ==
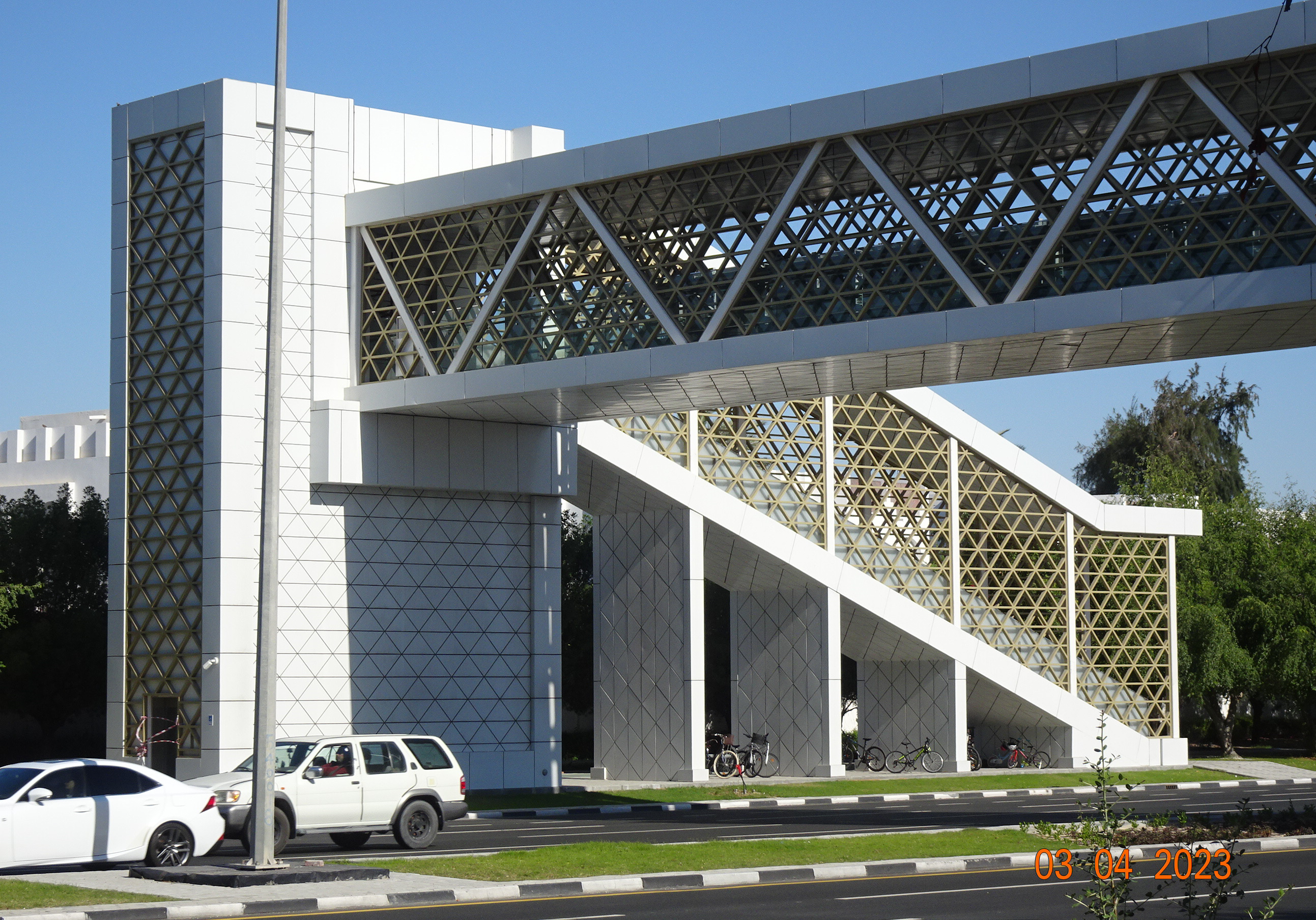
A covered pedestrian bridge in the Onaiza district of Doha

In a bid to improve pedestrian accessibility in congested areas, the Prime Minister of Qatar, Abdullah bin Nasser Al Thani, announced the inauguration of the Pedestrian Crossings Master Plan in 2018. The plan details 50 pedestrian crossings to be built throughout Qatar, mainly in Doha, and includes 26 pedestrian bridges and tunnels, and 24 crosswalks.

== Pipelines ==
The lengths of pipelines are 235 km for crude oil and 400 km for natural gas.

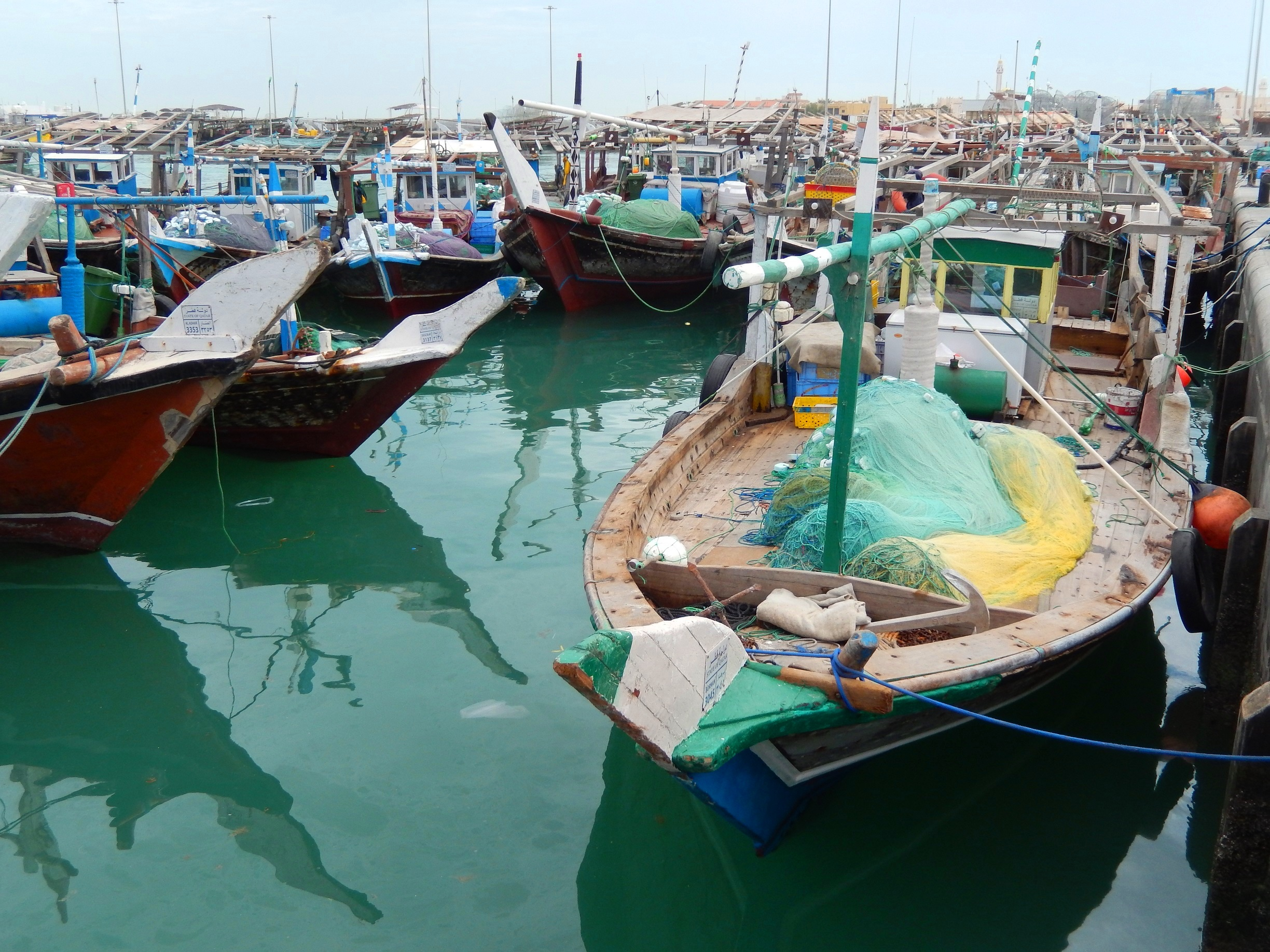
Dhows with fishing gear in the harbour in Al Khor

== Ports and harbours ==
=== Overview ===
Until the mid-1960s, Qatar's only deepwater port was the oil terminal at Mesaieed. Large vessels could not reach Doha due to a coral bar lying offshore. In 1970, Japanese company Penta-Ocean undertook dredging works to create a 27-foot-deep, 350-foot-wide channel extending 3.5 miles to the waterfront. Doha Port was completed in 1971 at a cost of about QR 144 million, after which maritime trade through the capital expanded rapidly. Between 1975 and 1976, cargo volumes at the port rose from 430,000 to 1.2 million tons. Doha Port remained the country's main commercial port until 2016, when its operations were transferred to the newly-opened Hamad Port in Umm Al Houl, south of Doha.

=== Persian Gulf ===
- Doha Port
- Halul Island Port
- Umm Sa'id Port
- Ras Laffan Port
- Hamad Port
- Ar Ru'ays Port

== Merchant marine ==
- Total: 24 ships (1,000 GT or over) totalling 721,756 GT/1,132,510 tonnes deadweight (DWT)
- Ships by type: cargo 10, combination ore/oil 2, container 7, petroleum tanker 5 (1999 est.)

== Airports ==
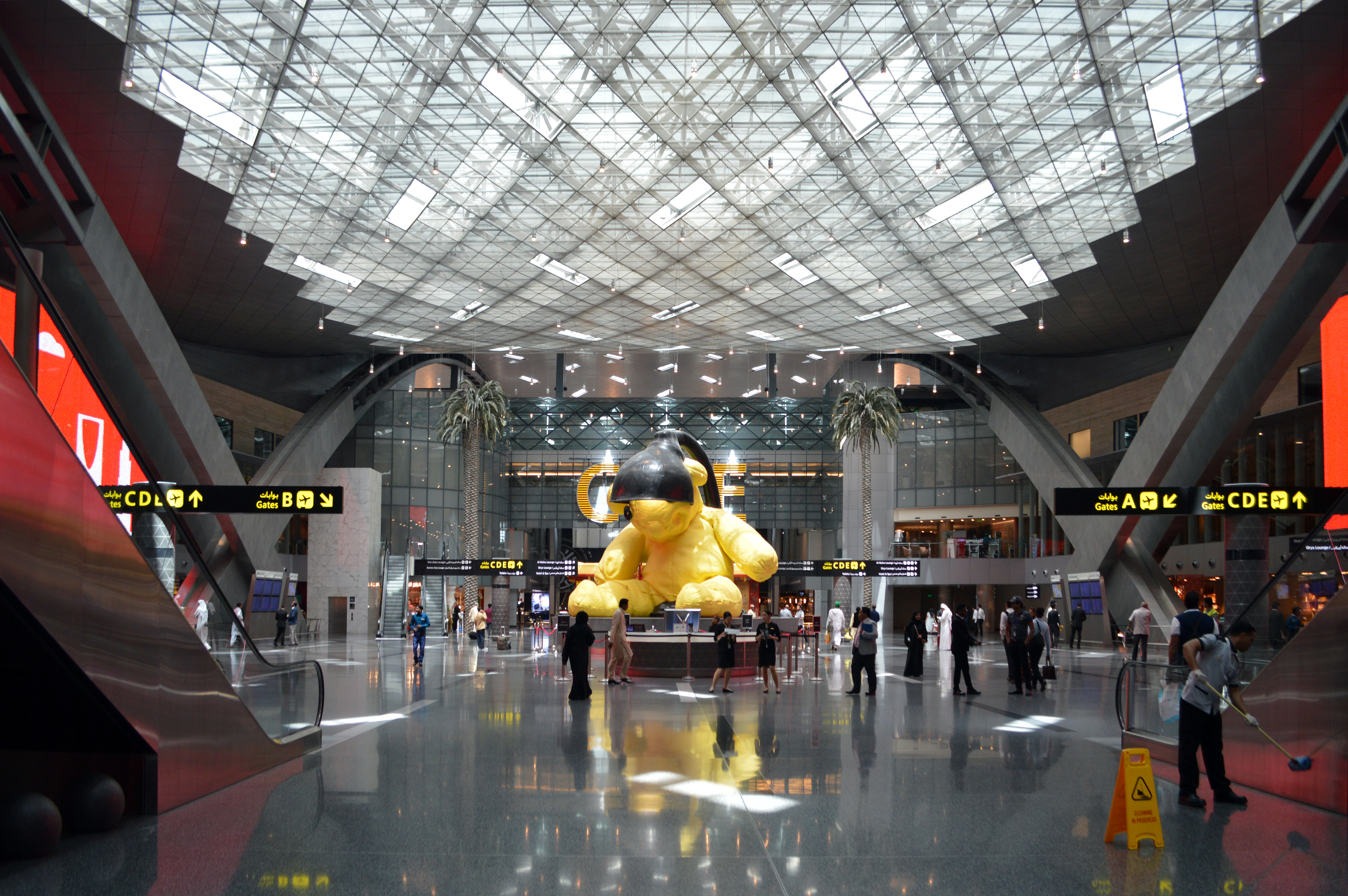
The Hamad International Airport, Doha, Qatar

=== Overview ===
There are 5 airports in Qatar, the largest of which and main one being Hamad International Airport in Doha which is the only international passenger airport in Qatar, spanning 22 km^{2} and with a 600,000m² terminal which serves 30 million passengers per year.

The first aviation authority was formed in 1973 as the Civil Aviation Department. This would be replaced by the Qatar Civil Aviation Authority in 2001.

=== Airports - with paved runways ===
- total: 4
- over 3,047 m: 3
- 1,524 to 2,437 m: 1 (2021)

=== Airports - with unpaved runways ===
- total: 2
- 914 to 1,523 m: 1
- under 914 m: 1 (2021)

=== Heliports ===
- 4 (2025)

== Qatar-based airlines ==
=== Scheduled flights ===
| Airline | Arabic Name | Image | IATA | ICAO | Callsign | Commenced Operations | Notes |
|---|---|---|---|---|---|---|---|
| Qatar Airways | الخطوط الجوية القطرية | | QR | QTR | QATARI | 1993 | Qatar Airways Company Q.C.S.C. (Arabic: الخطوط الجوية القطرية, al-Qaṭariyya), operating as Qatar Airways, is the flag carrier of Qatar. Headquartered in the Qatar Airways Tower in Doha, the airline operates a hub-and-spoke network, flying to over 170 international destinations across five continents from its base at Hamad International Airport. |

=== Charter airlines ===
| Airline | Arabic Name | Image | IATA | ICAO | Callsign | Commenced Operations | Notes |
|---|---|---|---|---|---|---|---|
| Gulf Helicopters | شركة الطائرات المروحية الخليجية | | DOH | OTBD | GHC | 1970 | Gulf Helicopters Company (GHC) is a Qatari helicopter services provider mainly servicing the oil and gas industry in Middle East, North Africa and Asia. It is a 100% subsidiary of Gulf International Services under the QatarEnergy umbrella, and has its headquarters in Doha, Qatar. |
| Qatar Executive | القطرية لطائرات رجال الاعمال | | QR | QQE | QREX | 2009 | Qatar Executive (Arabic: القطرية لطائرات رجال الاعمال) is a business jet subsidiary of Qatar Airways, based in Doha. |

=== Cargo airlines ===
| Airline | Arabic Name | Image | IATA | ICAO | Callsign | Commenced Operations | Notes |
|---|---|---|---|---|---|---|---|
| Qatar Air Cargo | الخطوط الجوية القطرية للشحن | | QR | QAC | QATAR CARGO | 2003 | Qatar air cargo is the Air cargo subsidiary of Qatar Airways, In Doha. |

=== Government airlines ===
| Airline | Arabic Name | Image | IATA | ICAO | Callsign | Commenced Operations | Notes |
|---|---|---|---|---|---|---|---|
| Qatar Amiri Flight | الطيران الأميري القطري | | - | QAF | AMIRI | 1977 | Qatar Amiri Flight is a VVIP airline owned and operated by the government of Qatar. It operates on-demand, worldwide charters and caters almost exclusively to the royal family of Qatar and government officials. While commercial flights of Qatar Airways operate at Hamad International Airport since 2014, the Qatar Amiri Flight remains based in the old Doha International Airport. |

== See also ==
- Transport in Doha
