= Al Majd Road =

Road in Qatar

- Orbital Highway; New Orbital Road and Truck Route
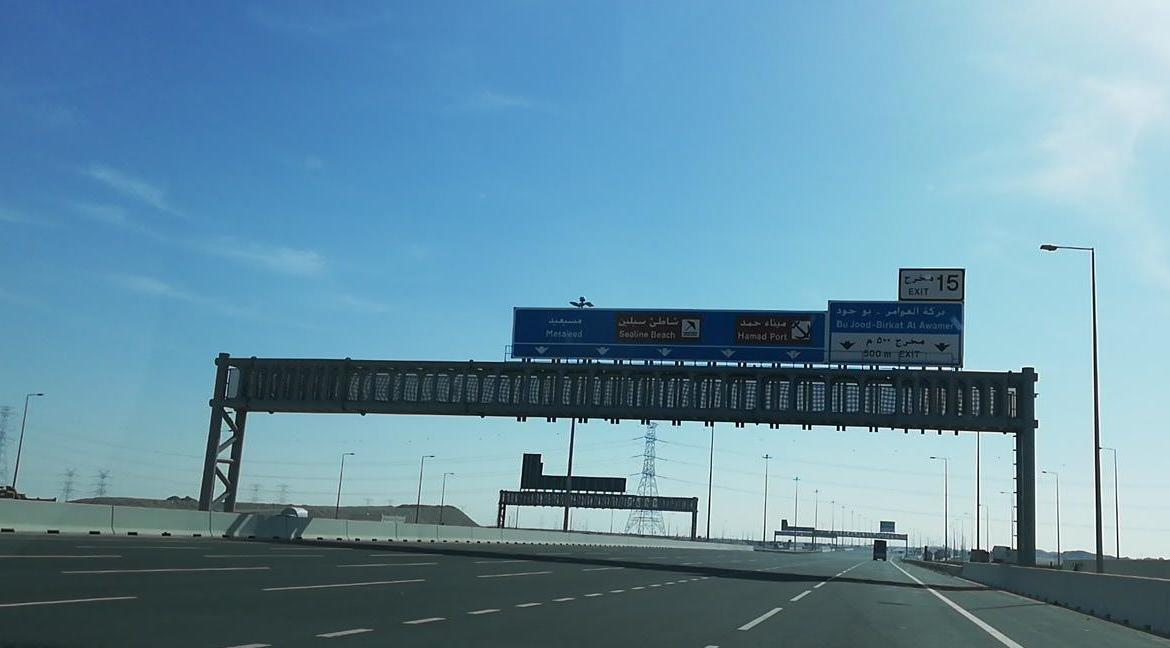
- Exit 15 on Al Majd Road in Al Wakrah Municipality

Route information
- Length: 195 km (121 mi)
- Existed: 2017 (unofficially); 2019 (officially)–present

Major junctions
- G-Ring Road; Salwa Road; Dukhan Highway; Al Shamal Road

Location
- Country: Qatar
- Major cities: Mesaieed, Doha Industrial Area, Al Khor, Ras Laffan

Highway system
- Transport in Qatar

Al Majd Road (formerly known as the Orbital Highway) is the longest highway in Qatar, running at a length of 195 kilometres (121 mi) from south-to-north. It begins in Mesaieed in Al Wakrah Municipality and extends north towards Ras Laffan on the coast in Al Khor Municipality.

Constructed by Ashghal (the Public Works Authority), the road features 7 lanes in both directions, which altogether can accommodate roughly 16,000 vehicles an hour. There are 21 main interchanges, linking the highway with other important roads such as G-Ring Road, Salwa Road, Dukhan Highway, and Al Shamal Road. Ashghal claims that, compared to the alternative route running through Doha proper, Al Majd Road reduces travel time by up to 50% from its beginning to end.

The highway was officially opened in February 2019; its opening marked a name change from the Orbital Highway to Al Majd Road.

== Description ==
Al Majd Road was designed to reduce traffic congestion in Doha by providing an alternative north-to-south route which strategically runs through most of Qatar's largest industrial and residential centers located outside Doha. The beginning and end points, Mesaieed and Ras Laffan, are both major industrial cities which generate heavy loads of traffic. Not far north of Mesaieed is Qatar's main commercial seaport Hamad Port, which directly connects with Qatar's most populated industrial area, the Doha Industrial Area exclave surrounded by Al Rayyan and Al Wakrah Municipality. Another industrial center which is indirectly served by the Al Majd Road is the western city of Dukhan, which connects at the Dukhan Highway–Al Majd Road junction.

== Development ==
Construction of Al Majd Road first began in early 2014 under the name Orbital Highway. By July 2017 Ashghal announced that almost 125 km, or two-thirds of the highway had been constructed, marking the completion of phase one of development and its unofficial opening for traffic.

The highway was officially completed and unveiled to the public in February 2019. Upon its unveiling, its name was changed from Orbital Highway to Al Majd Road, to reflect the popular cultural icon of Tamim Almajd, which was created during the Qatar diplomatic crisis.

== Major junctions ==
- Al Majd Road–G-Ring Road junction is at Bu Jood Interchange. G-Ring Road is a highway running from Hamad International Airport to Al Majd Road. This junction provides an alternate route for residents of southern Doha and northern Al Wakrah who wish to travel to Lusail or Al Khor in the north or Dukhan in the west. Furthermore, new arrivals at the airport can bypass downtown Doha by arriving at this junction.
- Al Majd Road–Salwa Road junction is at Mesaieed Interchange, also known as Interchange 24. This junction allows residents of Al Rayyan City and the Doha Industrial Area to travel north towards Al Khor or south towards Mesaieed without crossing into Doha.
- Al Majd Road–Dukhan Highway junction is a crucial junction for traffic from Dukhan, Al Shahaniya and Rawdat Rashed which is headed towards Al Khor, Lusail, Mesaieed and Hamad International Airport.
- Al Majd Road–Al Shamal Road junctions are at Al Mazruah Interchange and Umm Asmira Interchange. This junction allows commuters from Al Khor travelling on Al Shamal Road easy access to Dukhan Highway via Al Majd Road. It also permits residents of Umm Salal Municipality to access Dukhan Highway without having to navigate the traffic of Doha proper.
