= Louis Berger =

American civil engineer

- Born: April 14, 1914; Lawrence, Massachusetts, United States
- Died: August 14, 1996 (aged 82); Manhattan, New York, United States
- Occupations: Civil engineer; Engineer

Louis Berger (14 April 1914 – 14 August 1996) was an American civil engineer. A graduate of Tufts College, Berger received his master's degree in soils and geology from MIT and doctorate in soil mechanics from Northwestern. He was a former faculty member of Pennsylvania State University's engineering department, which designed a large portion of the Pennsylvania Turnpike. After completion of the contract, he opened a second office which often employed local labor to fulfill international contracts. He was involved in designing and building highways, railroads, bridges, and airfields in 120 countries. His company grew to become the Louis Berger Group.

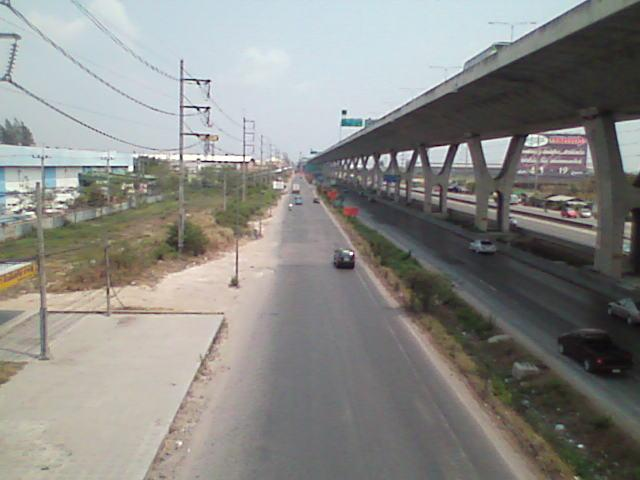
Bang Na Expressway is one of the longest bridges in the world.

In 1994, Berger designed the world's longest car bridge (at the time) in Thailand, the Bang Na Expressway. It held the title of the world's longest bridge from 2000 until 2004. Today, it is the 6th longest bridge in the world.
