= Labour City, Qatar =

Labour City
- Camp
- Location within Qatar
- Coordinates: 25°11′24″N 51°28′9″E

Area
  - Total: 3 km^{2} (1.2 sq mi)

Population
  - Total: 68,000
  - Density: 23,000/km^{2} (59,000/sq mi)

Labour City is a newly opened migrant camp for foreign workers in Qatar. Located on the outskirts of Doha, it is designed to hold 68,640 people. Qatar, responding to intense international criticism over mistreatment of migrant workers constructing facilities for the 2022 FIFA World Cup, built the camp for an estimated €750 million.

It includes multiple facilities, namely a 17,000-seat theatre, commercial centres, markets, four cinemas, a cricket field, two police stations, two mosques, a medical centre and a dedicated maintenance building. The city accommodation phase consists of 55 buildings (G+2). Each building has 312 rooms (24 sqm each), six dining halls, six kitchens and six laundry rooms. There is a very high degree of surveillance and security within the area.

Despite the accommodation and amenities it brings, Labour City has been criticised to be part of a broader urban planning strategy to segregate Qatar's low-income workforce from the general population and away from established residential areas in a forced-gentrification fashion.

== History ==
Constructed in phases, the official opening ceremony was held on 1 November 2015. 50,000 workers were already living in its 55 large dormitory buildings.

== See also ==
- Industrial Area (Doha)
