= Industrial Area (Doha) =

Industrial Area الدوحة المنطقة الصناعية
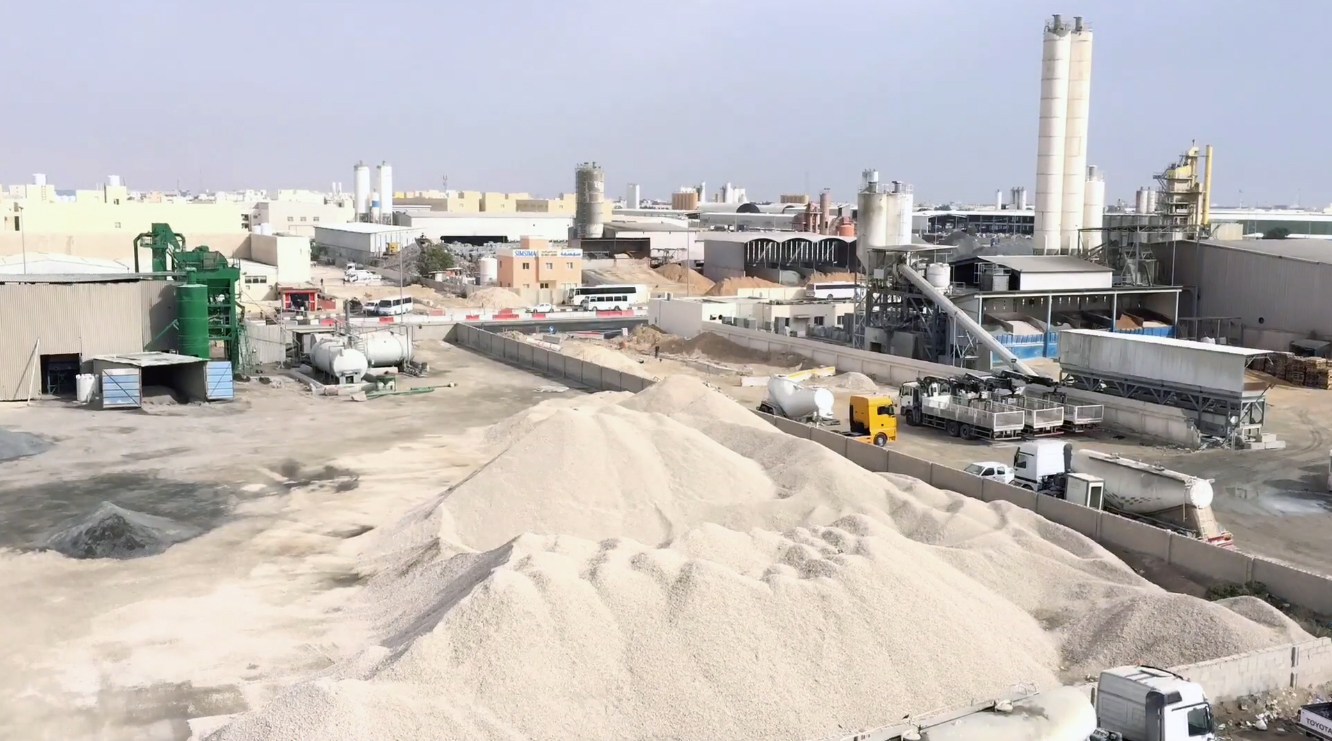
- Street 41 in the Doha Industrial Area

- Location within Qatar
- Coordinates: 25°10′3″N 51°26′22″E
- Country: Qatar
- Municipality: Doha

Area
  - Total: 32.1 km^{2} (12.4 sq mi)

Population (2020)
  - Total: 313,754
  - Density: 9,770/km^{2} (25,300/sq mi)

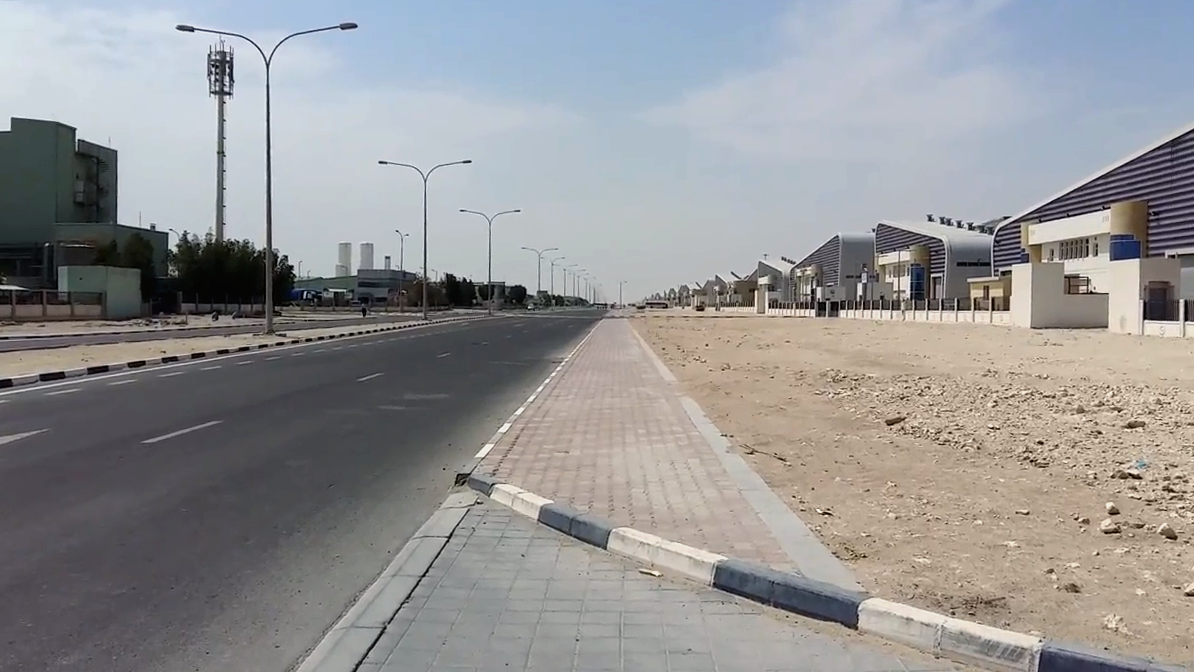
Street 1 serves as the main bus terminus of the Industrial Area

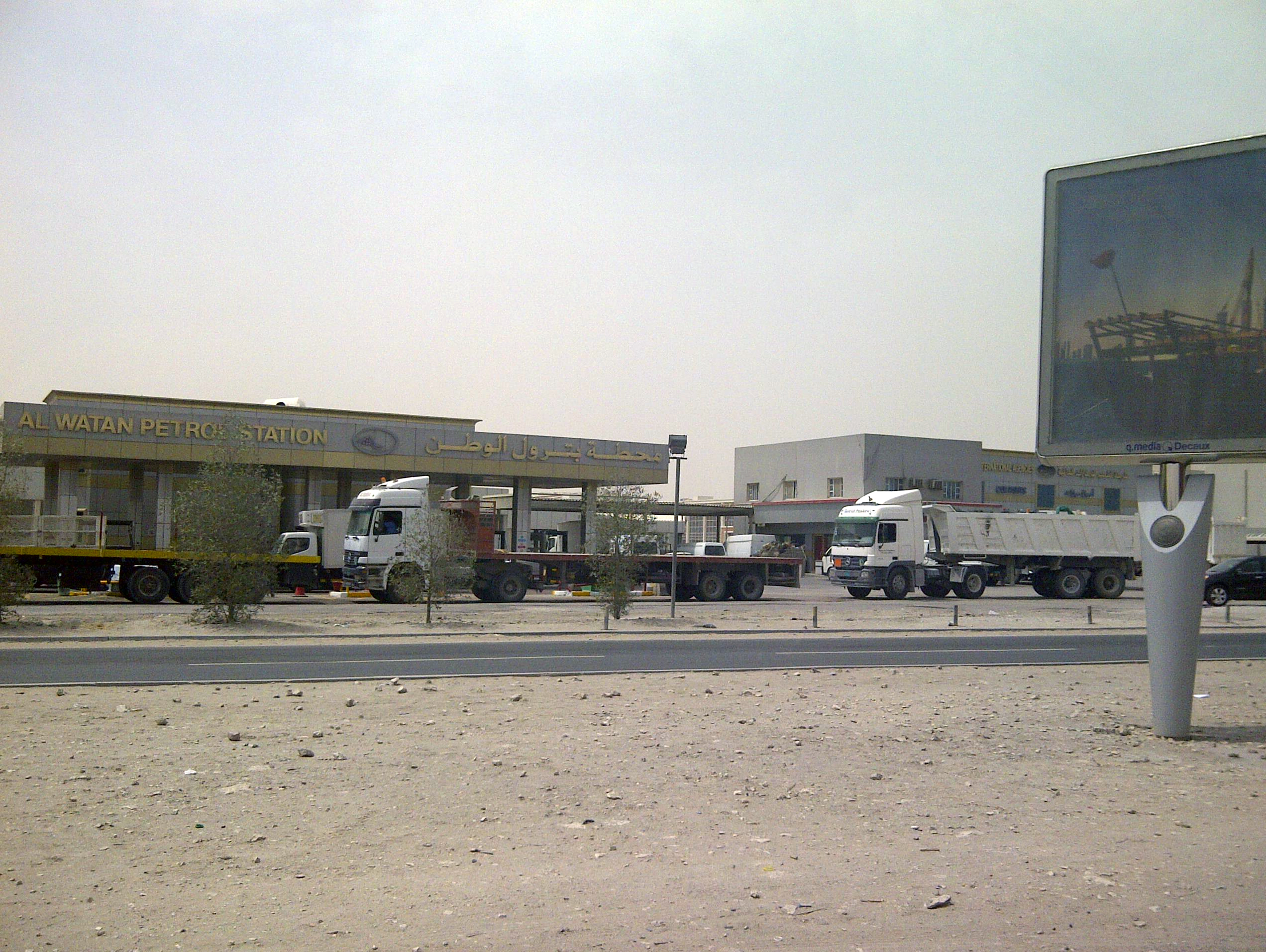
A gas station in the Industrial Area

The Doha Industrial Area (Arabic: الدوحة المنطقة الصناعية, romanized: Ad-Dawḥah al-Minṭaqat aṣ-Ṣinā'yah) is a district of Doha Municipality, Qatar. It was previously a part of the Al Rayyan Municipality, which now geographically separates it from the rest of Doha Municipality. The majority of the area's workers reside in the adjacent Labour City.

A municipal office for Doha Municipality is found in the district.

== Asian Town ==
Asian Town is a major commercial complex in the Industrial Area. Formerly known as West End Park, it contains many amenities for the district, such as West End Park International Cricket Stadium, an amphitheater, a large shopping mall and three cinema halls. It was built to cater towards the large Asian expatriate population from South Asia and Southeast Asia in Qatar, particularly the Indian, Bangladeshi, Pakistani, Nepali and Filipino communities.

== Healthcare ==
Hazm Mebaireek General Hospital, centrally located in the district, received its first outpatients in September 2018. In December 2018, the hospital was officially opened to the public.

== Public Transport ==
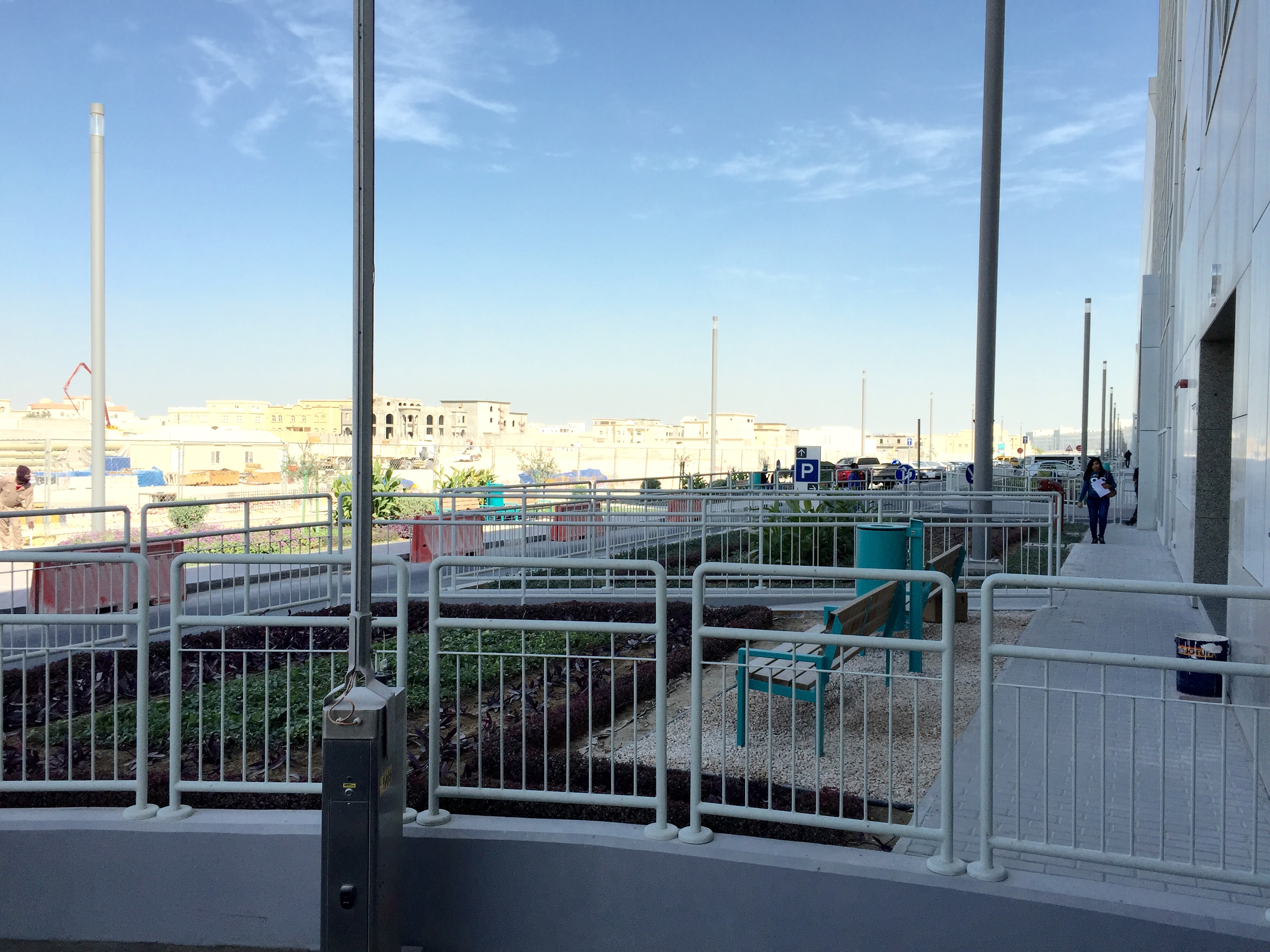
Barwa Commercial Ave. in the Industrial Area. Barwa Commercial Ave. is an 8 km-long commercial hub located along East Industrial Road.

=== Bus ===
Mowasalat is the official transport company in Qatar and serves the community through its operation of public bus routes. As the most populous area located outside of downtown Doha, the Industrial Area is served by six bus lines, four of which depart from Al Ghanim Bus Station and two of which depart at the Karwa Bus Station. Furthermore, there is a bus station in Asian Town which serves as the station of departure for six daily routes.

- Al Ghanim Bus Station departures (all routes from this station terminate at Street 1 in the Industrial Area)
  - Route 32
    - Stops at Al Sadd and Villaggio Mall
    - Runs every 20 minutes
  - Route 33
    - Stops at Salwa Road
    - Runs every 20 minutes
  - Route 33A
    - Stops at Salwa Road and Ain Khaled
    - Runs every 30 minutes
  - Route 33C
    - Stops at Salwa Road and the Criminal Evidences and Information Department (CEID)
    - Runs every 30 minutes
- Karwa Bus Station departures (circular routes)
  - Routes 61 and 81 are identical
    - Stop in the Industrial Area on Street 52
    - Run every 30 minutes

=== Rail ===
The elevated Industrial Area Metro Station is under construction, having been launched during Phase 1A. Once completed, it will be part of Doha Metro's Green Line.

== Demographics ==
As of the 2010 census, the district comprised 29,001 housing units and 4,395 establishments. There were 261,401 people living in the district, of which 99.9% were male and 0.1% were female. Out of the 261,401 inhabitants, 99% were 20 years of age or older and 1% were under the age of 20.

Employed persons made up 99.8% of the total population. Females accounted for 0% of the working population.

| Year | Population |
|---|---|
| 2004 | 62,555 |
| 2010 | 261,401 |
| 2015 | 364,710 |
| 2020 | 313,754 |
