= Legorreta (surname) =

Legorreta is a surname found in Mexico. Notable people with the surname include:

- César Armando Librado Legorreta (born 1981), Mexican serial killer, known as El Coqueta
- Enriqueta Legorreta (1914–2010) Mexican opera singer and environmental activist
- Jorge Legorreta (1948–2012), Mexican architect
- Jorge Legorreta Ordorica (born 1970), Mexican politician
- Pablo Legorreta, Mexican-American billionaire, founder of Royalty Pharma
- Ricardo Legorreta (1931–2011), Mexican architect
- Víctor Legorreta (born 1966), Mexican architect, son of Ricardo
