= Lejarreta =

Lejarreta is a Basque surname. Notable people with the surname include:

- Iñaki Lejarreta (1983–2012), Spanish mountain biker
- Ismael Lejarreta (born 1953), Spanish racing cyclist
- Marino Lejarreta (born 1957), Spanish road racing cyclist

== See also ==
- Legarreta
