= Legorreta =

Legorreta may refer to:

- Legorreta, Spain, a town in the Basque Country of Spain
- Legorreta (surname), a Mexican surname
