= Hamam Mosque =

Cultural heritage monument of Kosovo

- Hamam Xhamia (Albanian)
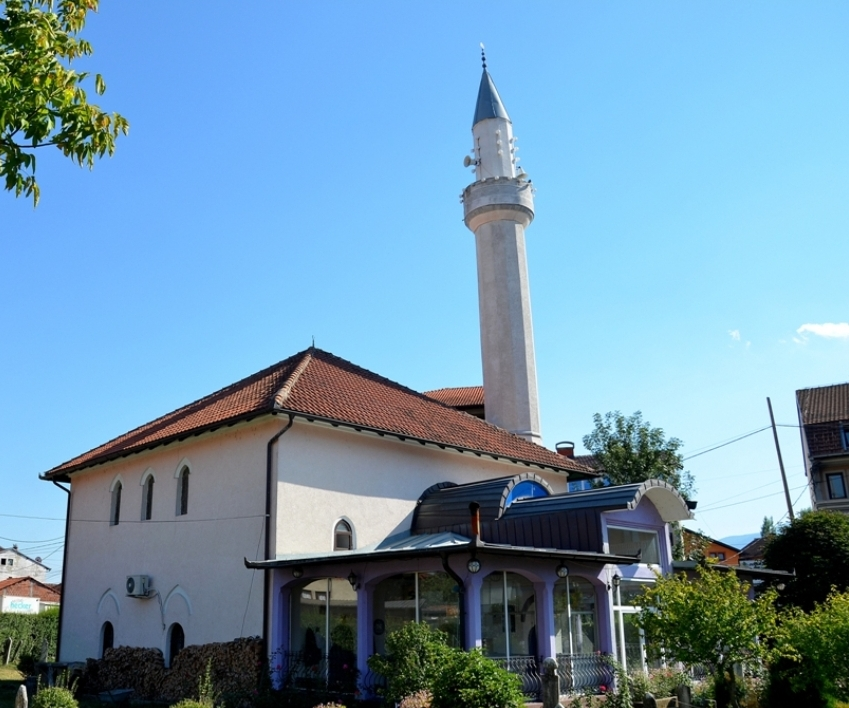
- Interactive map of Hamam Mosque
- Location: Peja, Kosovo

History
- Built: 16th century

The Hamam Mosque is a cultural heritage monument in Peja, Kosovo.

Built around 1587, the mosque lies near the Haxhi Bey hamam and the oldest Albanian language school in the city. Also known as Bulla Zade Hasan, the mosque saw fires in 1890 and during World War I, but was rebuilt five years after the war. Graves of different ages dot the mosque's courtyard. The original portico had a shadirvan (ablution fountain) to its right. Inside are prayer rooms, a müezzin mahfili (balcony for the call to prayer), a minbar (pulpit for the imam), and an entrance door to the minaret. The minaret is carved from stone and includes 12 corners with an arch on each. The total area of the building is 285 square metres (3,070 sq ft). The porch is a recent addition, and in general the building has been extensively renovated to conform to its surroundings, the last time being a 2001 restoration following its burning during the Kosovo War in 1999.
