= Mosque of Qaytbay (Qal'at al-Kabsh) =

Mosque in Cairo, Egypt

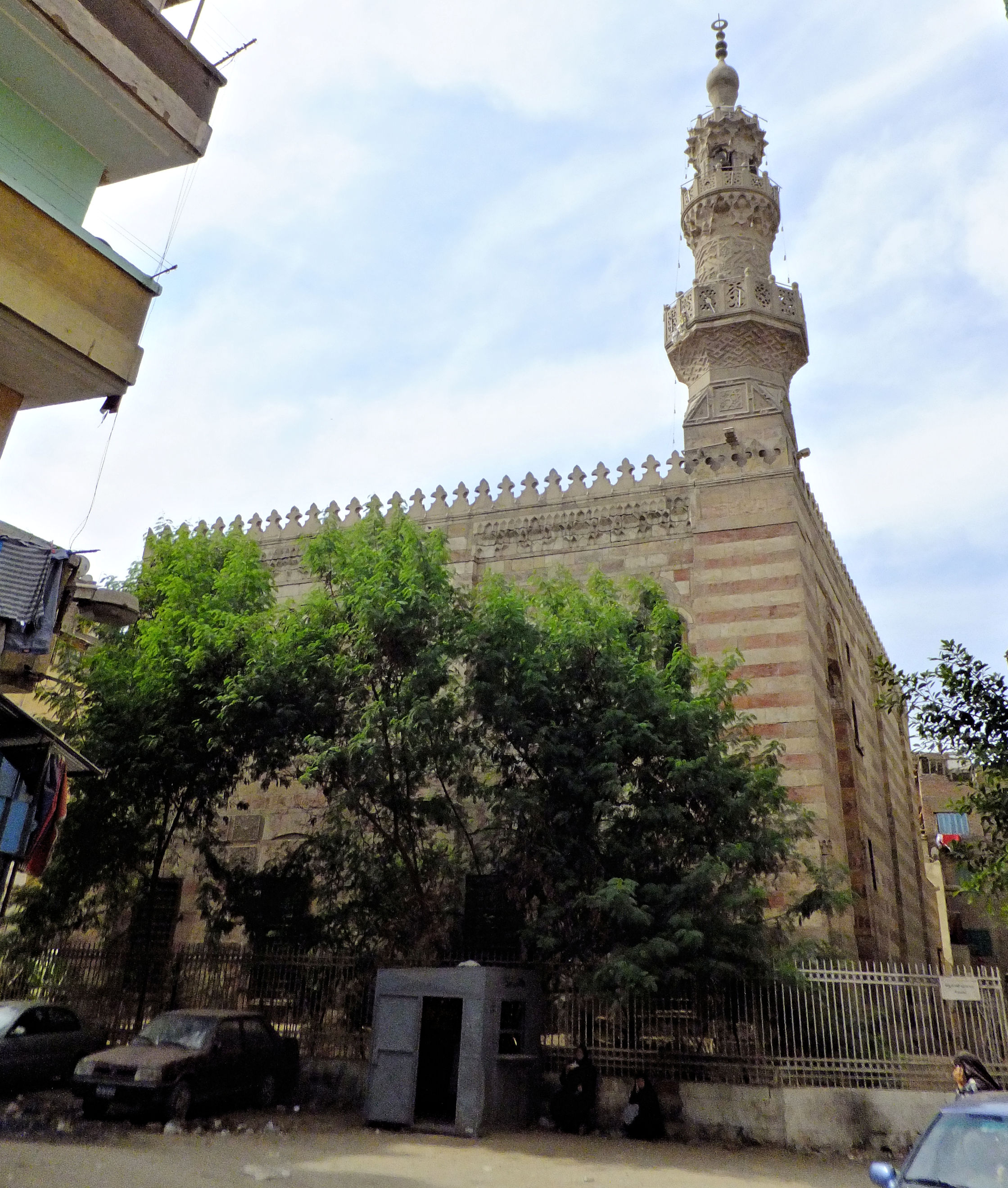

Religion
- Affiliation: Islam
- Patron: Sultan al-Ashraf Qaytbay

Location
- Location: Cairo, Egypt
- Interactive map of Mosque of Qaytbay
- Coordinates: 30°1′45″N 31°14′46″E

Architecture
- Type: madrasa, mosque, and hod (water trough)
- Style: late Mamluk
- Completed: 1475

Specifications
- Minaret: 1
- Materials: stone

The Mosque of Qaytbay, also known as the Madrasa of Qaytbay, is a historic religious structure in the Qal'at al-Kabsh neighbourhood of Cairo, Egypt. Completed in 1475, it is one of multiple monuments sponsored by the Mamluk sultan al-Ashraf Qaytbay. It is described as both a madrasa and a mosque by scholars, but functions as a mosque today.

== History ==
The madrasa, which now functions as a mosque, was built on the highest point of the Gabal Yashkur, a hill located near the Ibn Tulun Mosque. The area is known as Qal'at al-Kabsh ("Citadel of the Ram"), the name of a palace built by the Ayyubid sultan al-Salih Ayyub. According to Maqrizi, the palace was later destroyed by Sultan al-Nasir Muhammad. The construction of Qaytbay's madrasa was completed in 1475. Its foundation inscription identifies it as a madrasa, though it functions as a mosque today. The mosque was damaged during the 1992 earthquake and restored in 2006.

== Architecture ==
=== Exterior ===
The mosque's exterior features ablaq masonry but is relatively plain compared to other monuments of Qaytbay's time, with the exception of the richly decorated portals and minaret. There are two entrance portals: one at the east or northeast corner and another at the west or southwest corner. The eastern entrance was historically the main entrance, but the mosque is generally entered through the eastern one today. Both portals are set in shallow recesses of the mosque's façade, culminating in a trilobed arch and decorated with stone carving. The eastern portal has a canopy of groin vaulting and geometric decoration while the western portal has a canopy of muqarnas and arabesque decoration. Unlike other Mamluk monuments of the period, there is very little marble decoration. The eastern portal includes the building's foundation inscription. Next to the western portal, on the left, is a former hod or water trough for animals, which is the only other surviving part of this religious complex.

The mosque's minaret is ornately carved, but has an unusual form. Like most Mamluk minarets of this style, it has a three-level composition, but unlike most minarets its first level is short and significantly truncated. Instead of the usual muqarnas transition to the first-level balcony, the transition here is achieved via a curved cornice carved with an interlacing lozenge motif. The circular level above this is carved with a unique interlacing geometric pattern, with arabesque motifs carved in between.

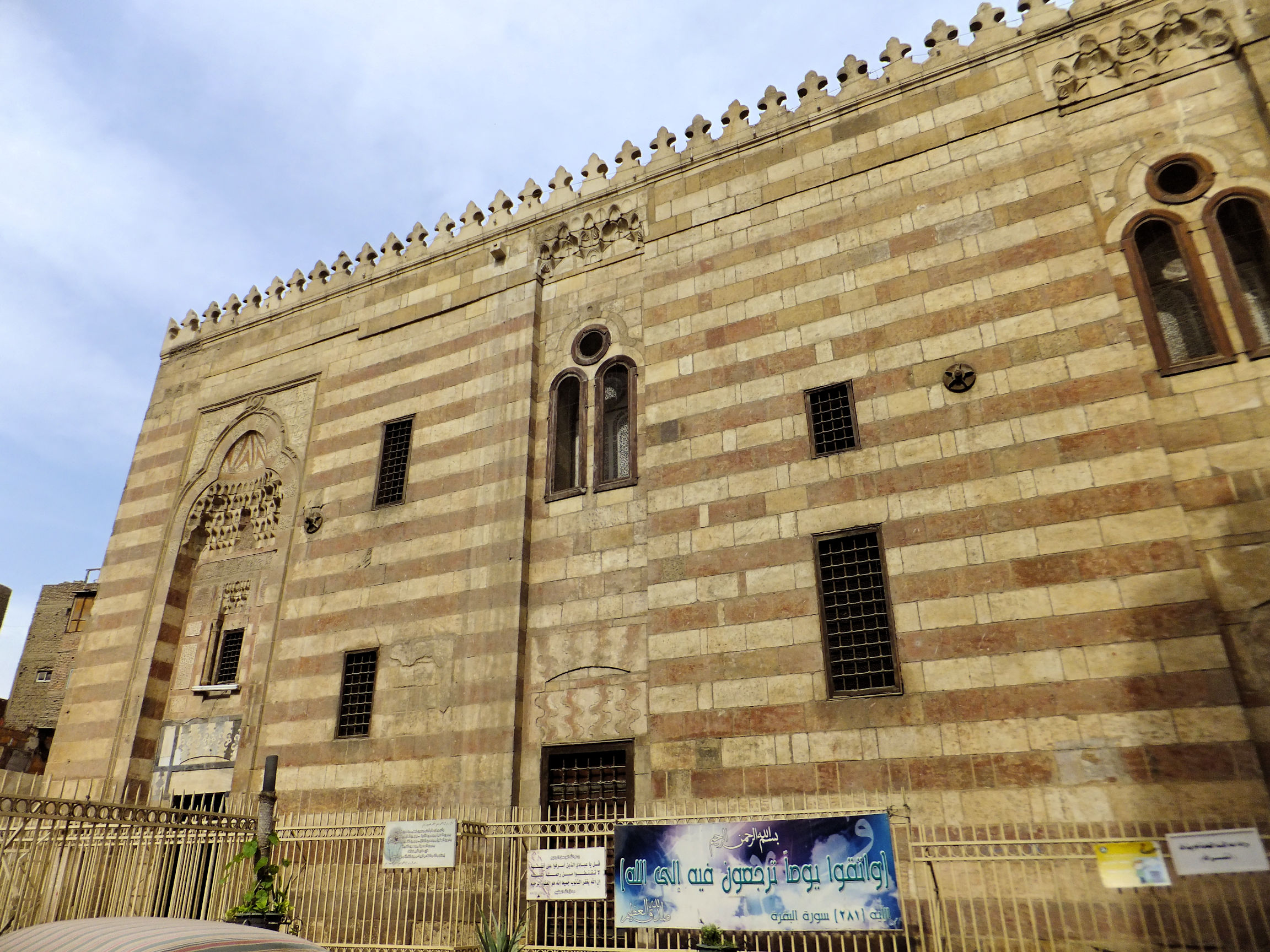
External façade of the mosque

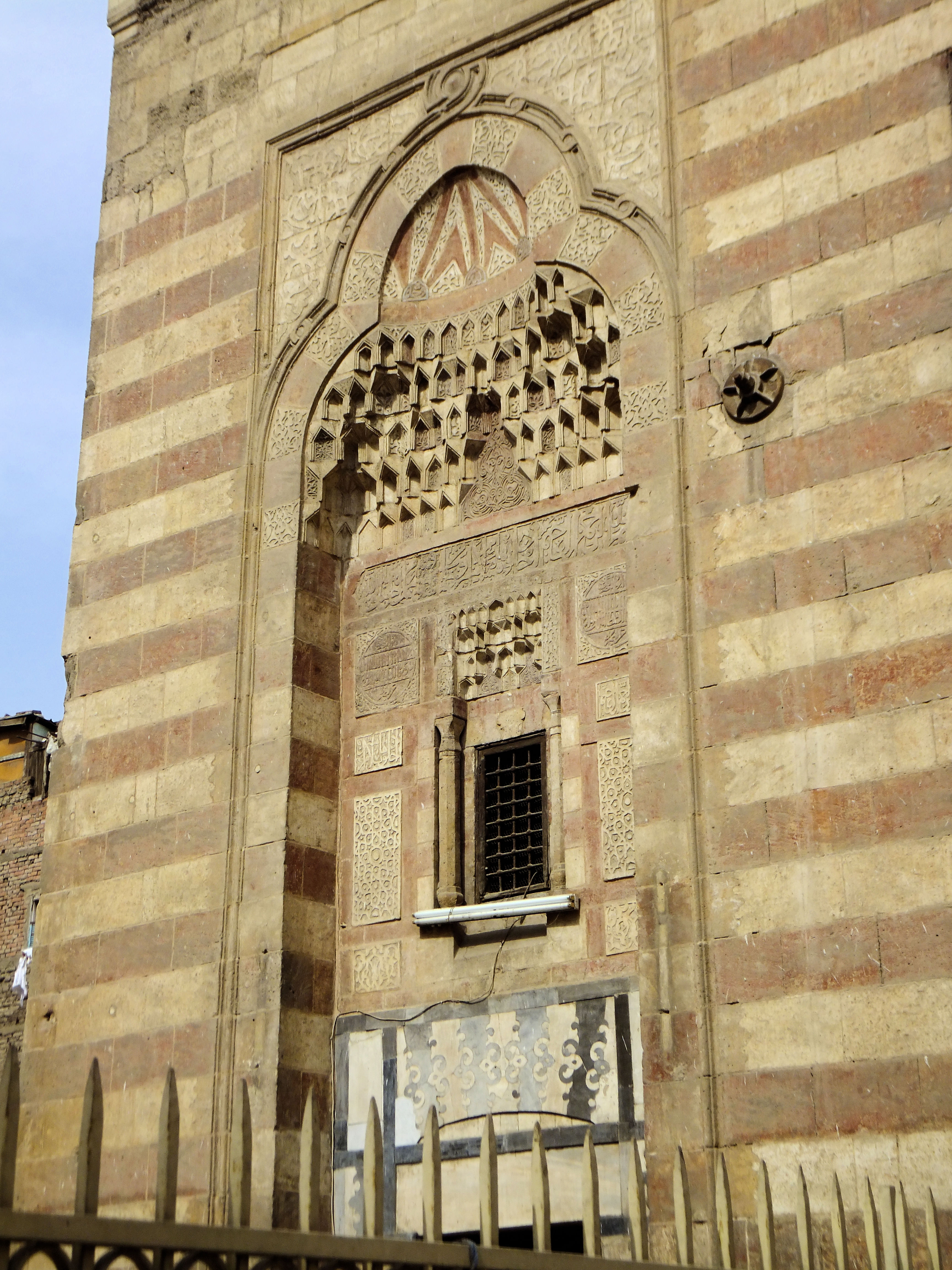
Southwestern portal of the mosque

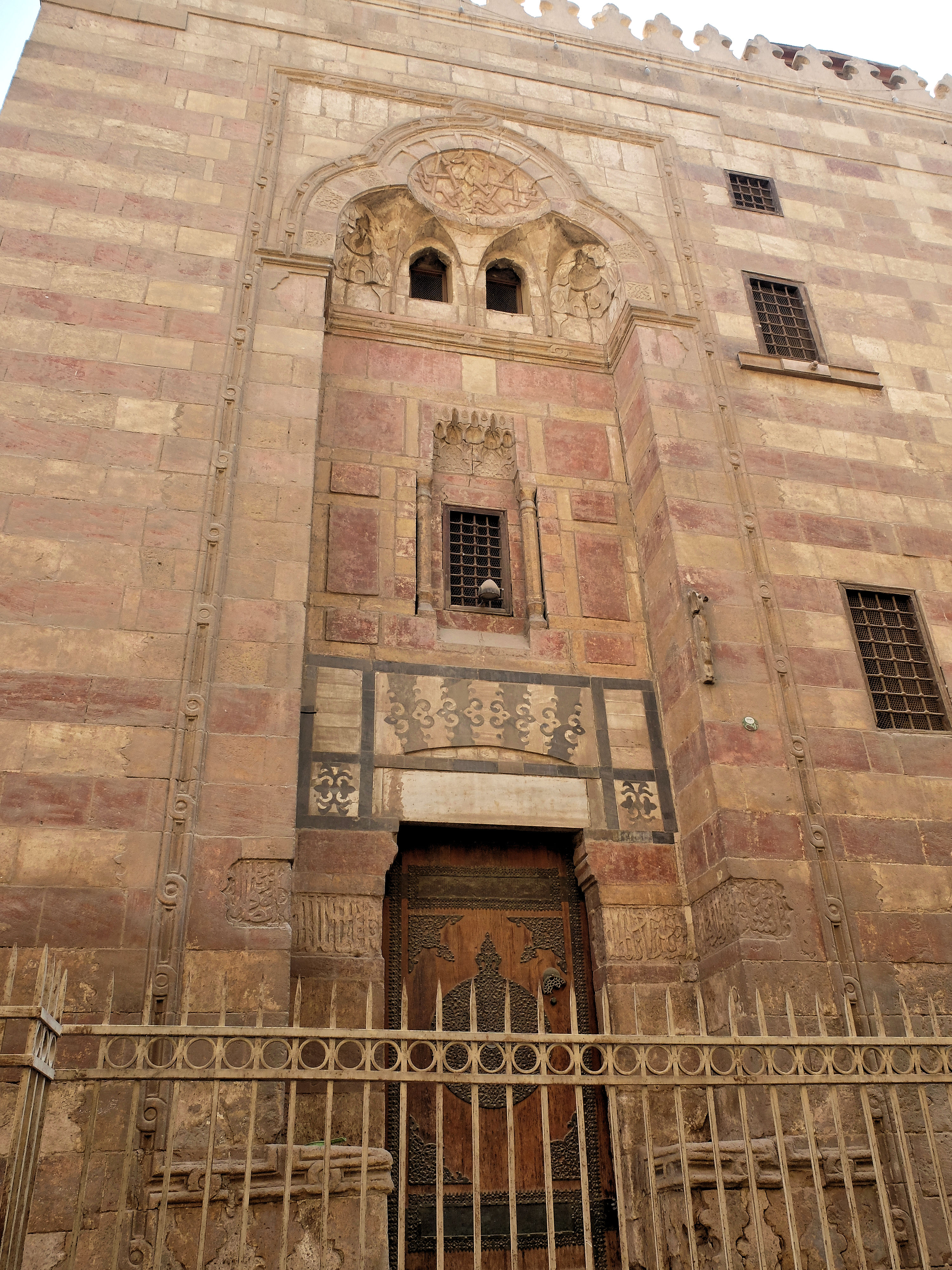
Northeastern portal

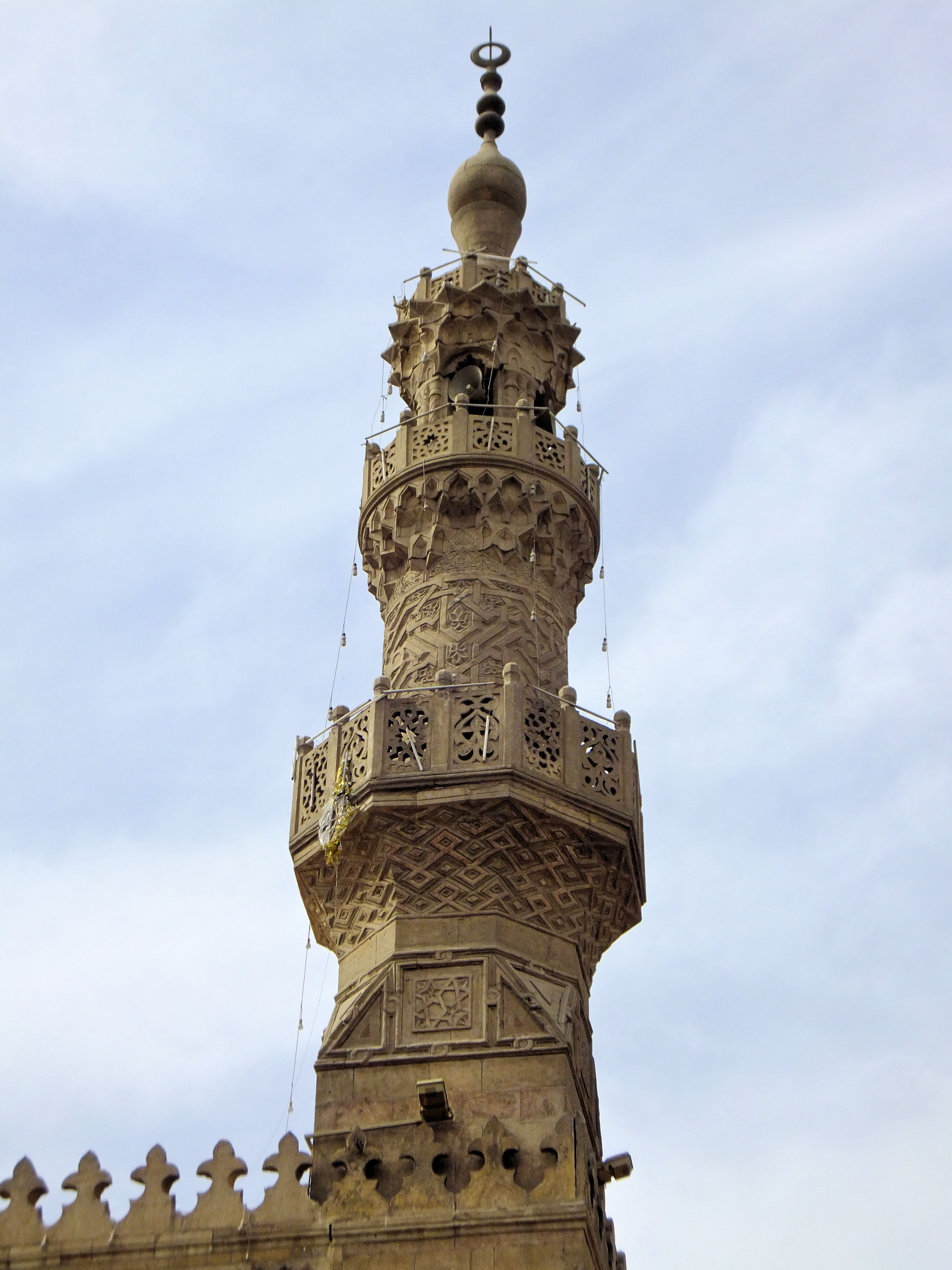
The minaret

=== Interior ===
The mosque's interior has the usual four-iwan layout typical of this period: a central courtyard surrounded by iwans on four sides, with the southeastern iwan containing the mihrab niche that symbolizes the direction of prayer. Each iwan is framed by a large pointed horseshoe arch with alternating white and beige voussoirs. The arches are notable for their extensive carved decoration, found in the white zones of the voussoirs and across the spandrels. Each spandrel is carved with an arabesque motif against a blue-painted background, with a central epigraphic medallion containing Qaytbay's name. Above the arches, running around the top of the courtyard, is an inscription band detailing the madrasa's foundation again. The wooden ceiling covering the courtyard today is a modern construction, but the ceilings inside the iwans are part of the original layout and have painted decoration.

The main floor of the courtyard is paved with black and white marble in a decorative pattern, although nowadays this is generally hidden under the carpets of the mosque. The mihrab, on the other hand, once again lacks marble decoration but features stone-carved arabesques instead, which radiate from the center of the niche where the word Allah is carved. Next to it, the minbar (pulpit) is a work of wood which retains most of its original form and decoration from Qaytbay's time. Across from this, in the opposite (northwest) iwan, is the women's section today, usually curtained off. This iwan also contains a dikka, a platform traditionally used by Qur'an reciters, but in the form of a balcony in the back wall.

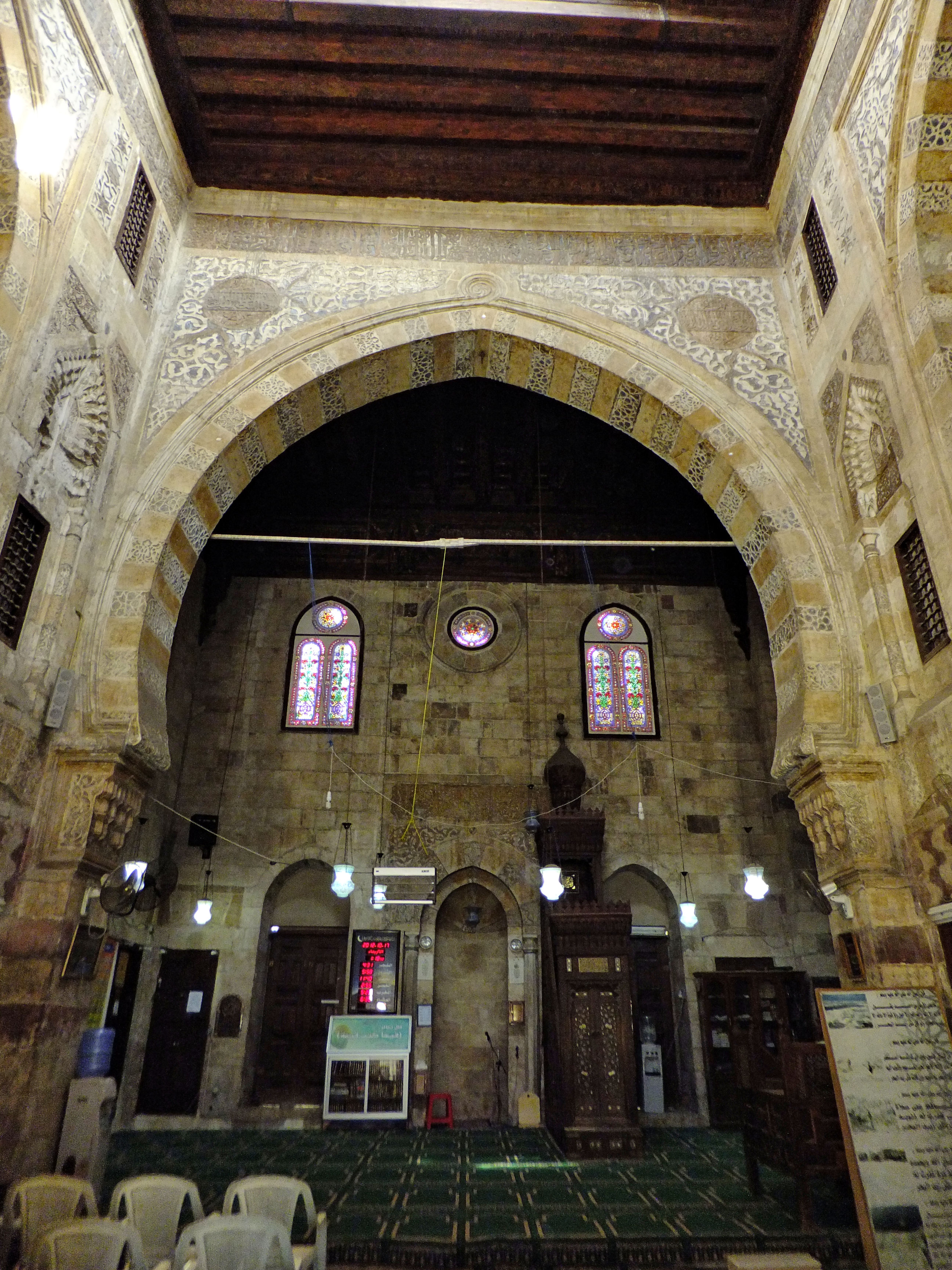
Interior of the mosque, looking towards the qibla (southeastern) iwan

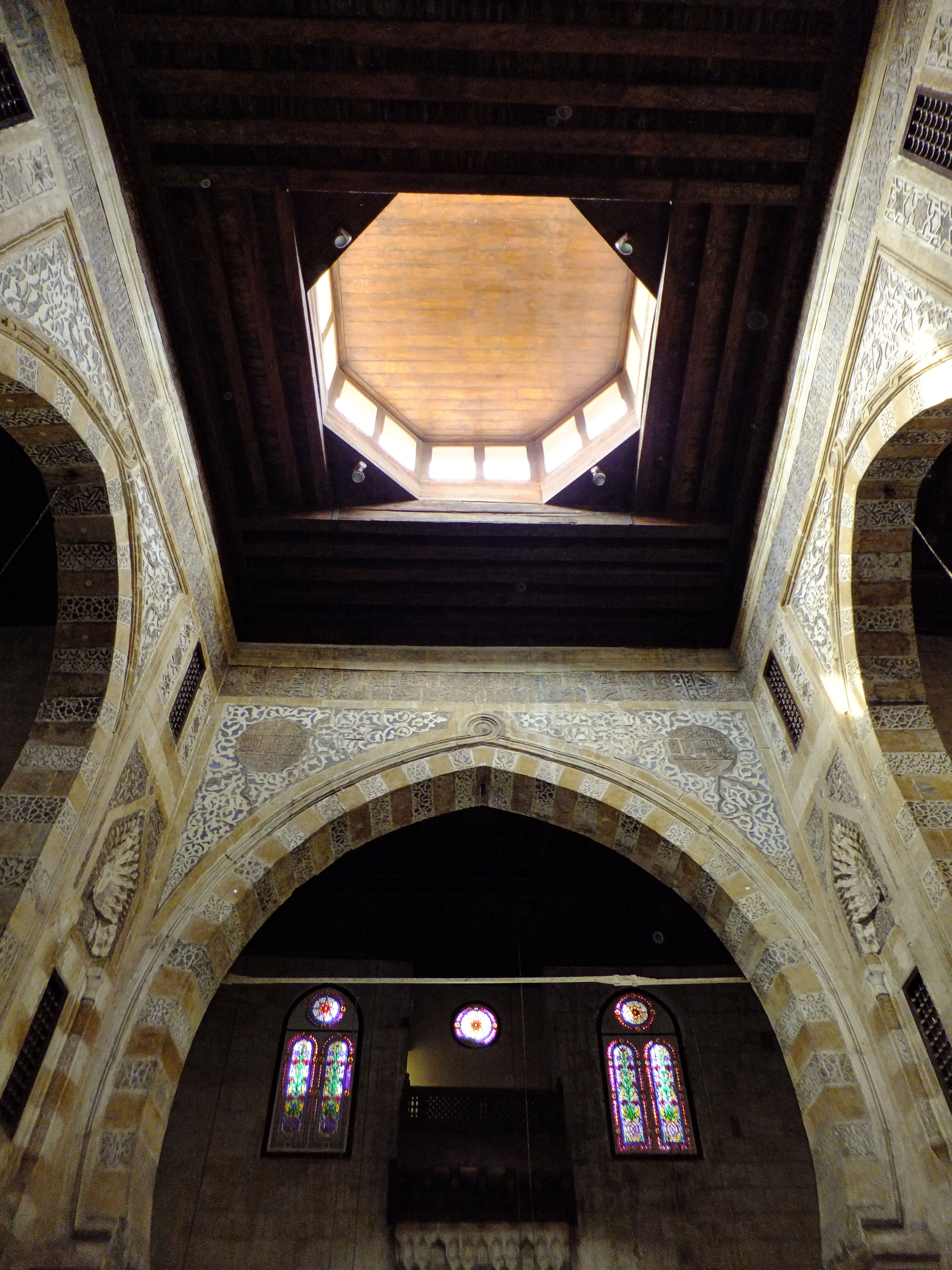
The ceiling over the central courtyard of the mosque

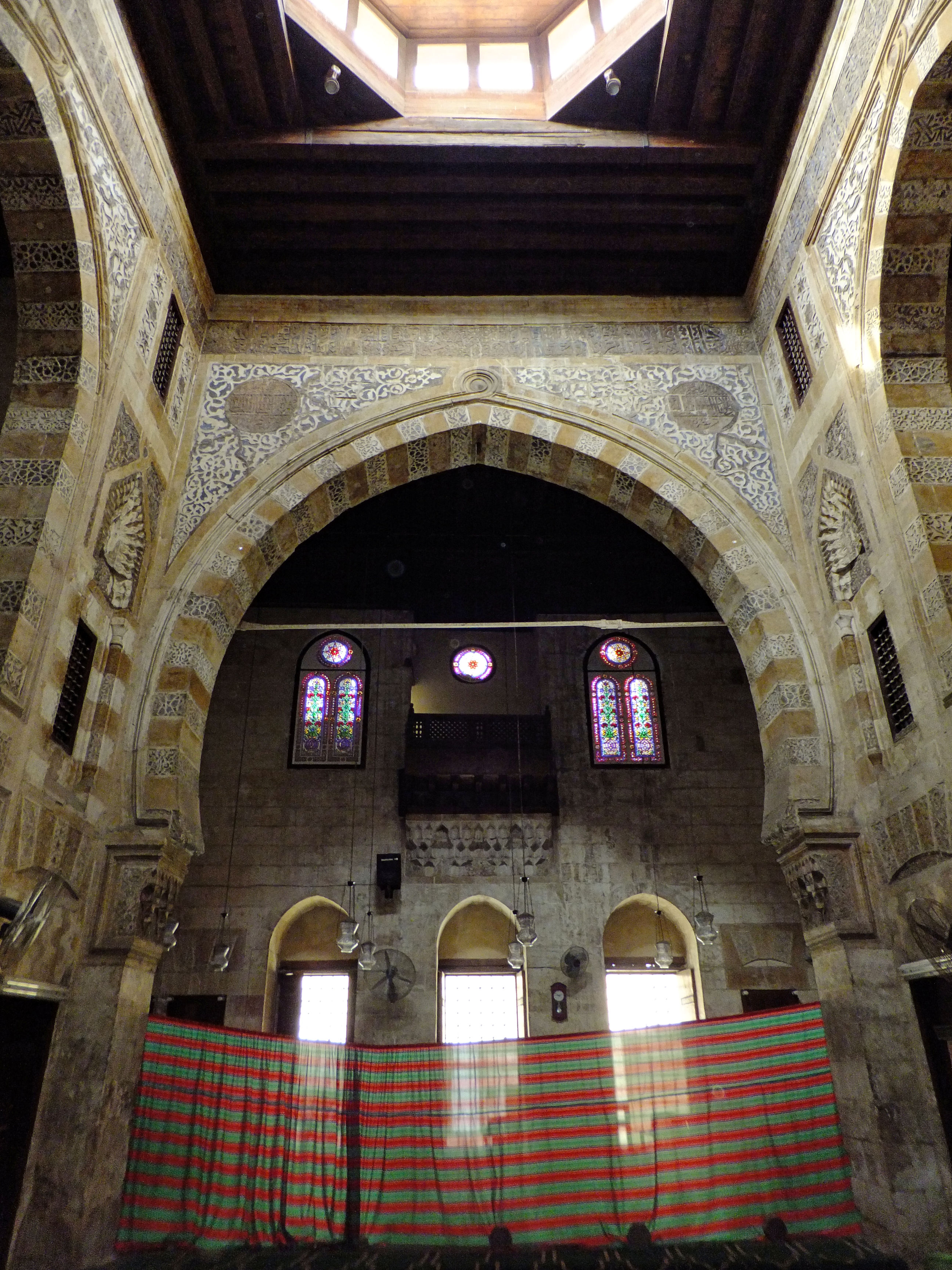
The northwestern iwan and the women's section, with a dikka balcony in the center of the far wall

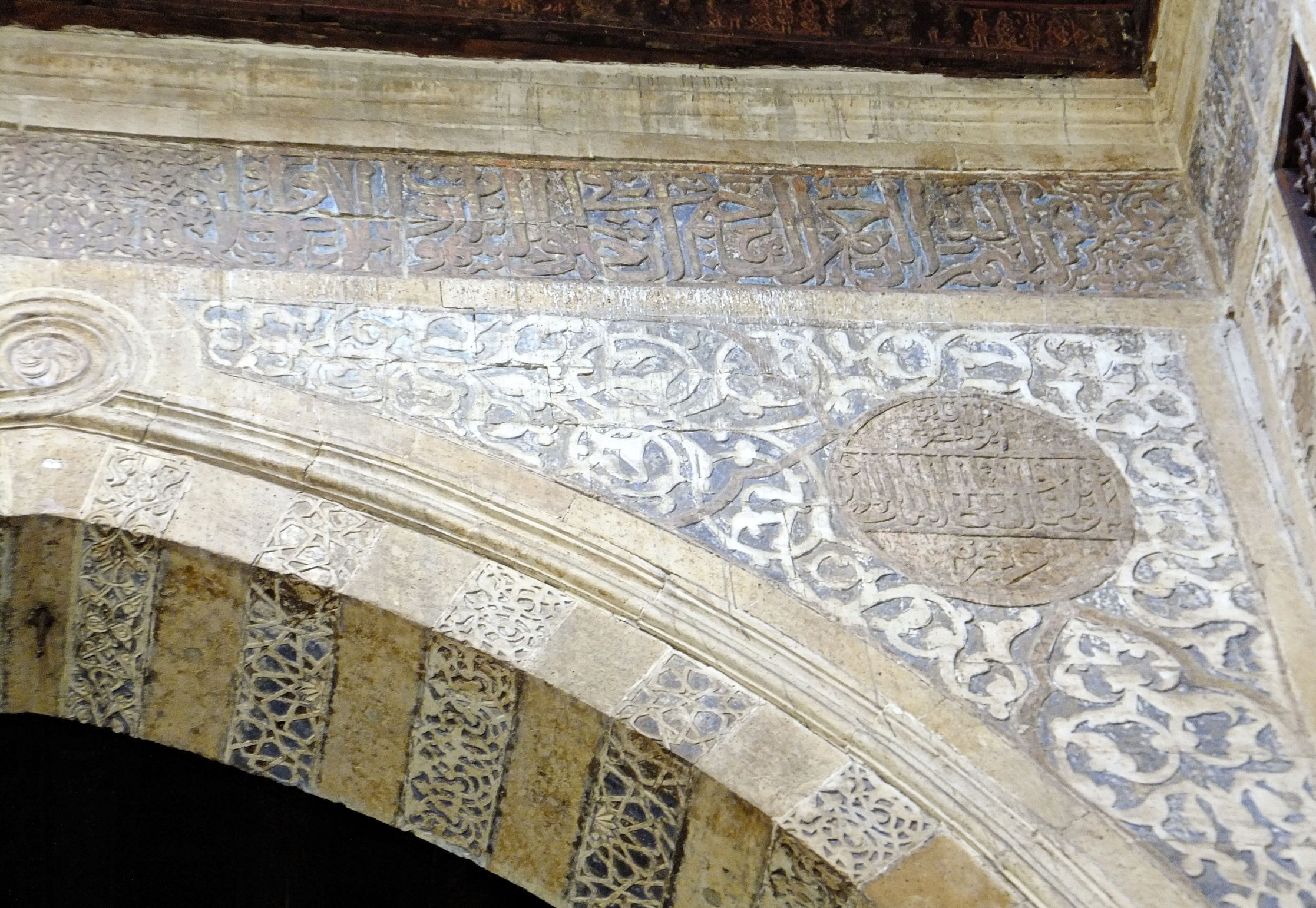
Details of the decoration of the spandrels of the iwan arches

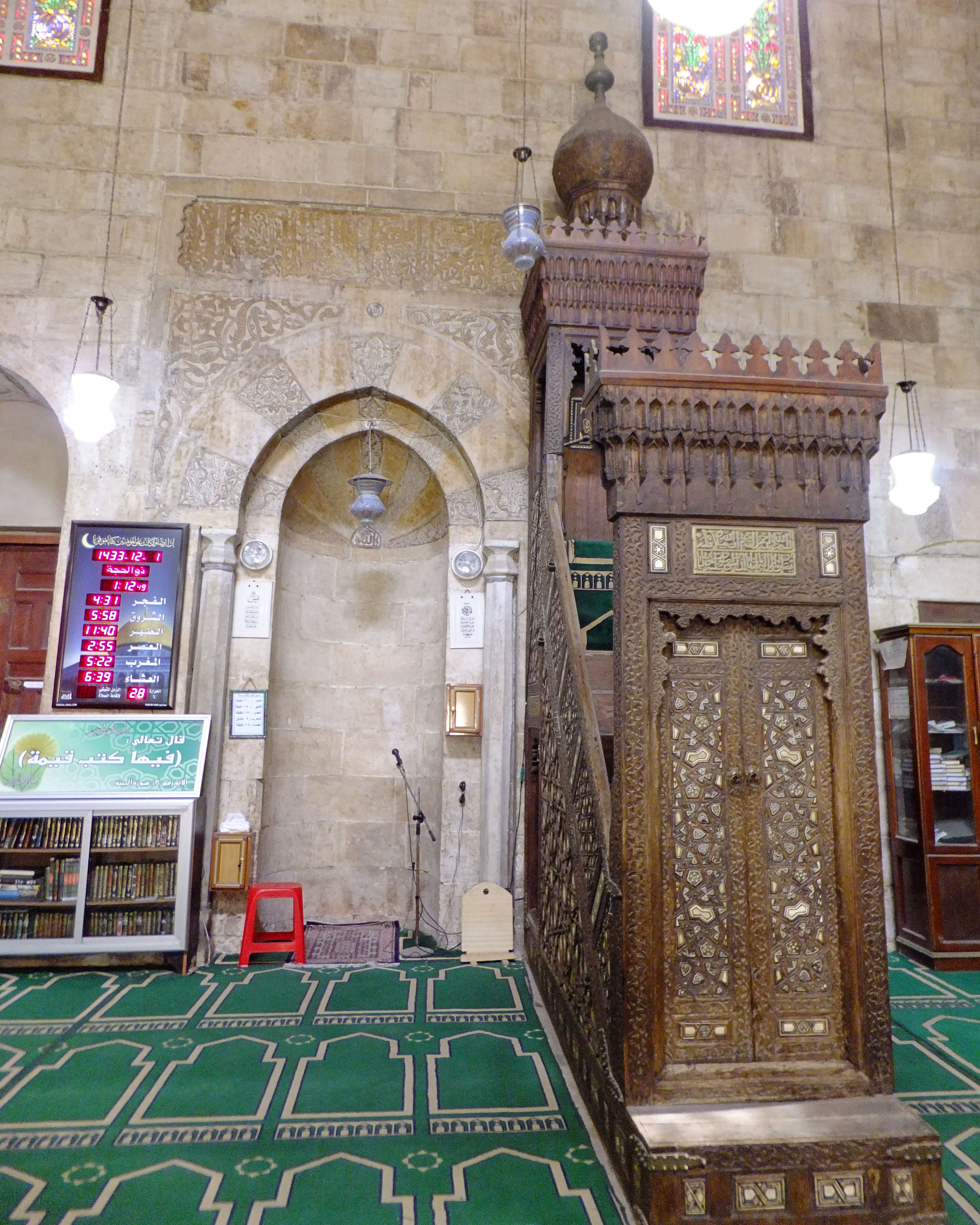
The mihrab and minbar

== See also ==
- Mamluk architecture
- Funerary complex of Sultan Qaytbay
