= Legarreta =

Legarreta is a surname. Notable people with the surname include:

- Andrea Legarreta (born 1971), Mexican actress and television presenter
- Germán Legarreta (born 1981), American actor
- Luis María de Larrea y Legarreta (1918–2009), Spanish Catholic bishop

== See also ==
- Legorreta (surname)
