= Royalty Pharma =

American biopharmaceutical company

- Type: Public
- Traded as: Nasdaq: RPRX
- Industry: Biopharmaceuticals
- Founded: 1996
- Founder: Pablo Legorreta
- Headquarters: New York City, United States
- Revenue: ▲US$2.38 billion (2025)
- Net income: ▼US$771 million (2025)
- Website: www.royaltypharma.com

Royalty Pharma is a private equity investor firm founded in 1996. It purchases the rights to royalties on future drug sales. It claims to own partial rights to 7 of the top 30 selling drugs in the United States.

As of 2026, it is valued at $26.1 billion (£19.3 billion).

== History ==
Royalty Pharma was founded in 1996 by Pablo Legorreta. Legorreta came to the idea of the company in the early 1990s when while working as a mergers banker at Lazard Frères, he saw a 1987 investment by wealthy clients of PaineWebber in a chemotherapy drug. From this, he realized that drug royalties held major potential. in 1996, he left Lazard and with Rory Riggs, a former PaineWebber banker, raised $60 million to start what would later become Royalty Pharma. Instead of making bets on early stage drug development, Royalty usually buys rights to royalties on regulator approved drugs or drugs that are promising. It buys rights from the patent holders, typically a predetermined percentage of revenue from the new drug after it enters the marketplace. The owners of the rights, usually universities or hospitals that need immediate cash instead of royalties are then able to fund new projects. Royalty owns rights to drugs sold by AbbVie, Pfizer, Gilead Sciences, Johnson & Johnson, and Vertex Pharmaceuticals. Billionaire brothers Germano and Giammaria Giuliani are major stakeholders, a result of Germano and his father meeting Legorreta in a Milan airport in 1996.

In 2013, Royalty began an attempt to acquire Irish drug company Elan Corp. In April 2013, shareholders of Elan voted against a takeover from Royalty valued Elan at around $7.3 billion. Royalty later offered around $6.4 billion for Elan. The offer was rejected in May 2013. In June 2013, Royalty offered $8 billion in its third attempt to acquire Elan. The firm ended its pursuit of Elan later that month.

In 2014, Royalty purchased the royalty rights to drugs developed with the financial support of the Cystic Fibrosis Foundation (CFF) for $3.3 billion. The payment covered the foundation's share of revenue from drugs like Kalydeco, which was developed by Vertex Pharmaceuticals with funding from the foundation. The deal was the largest royalty purchase ever made by Royalty. According to The New York Times, at the time it was believed to be "the largest financial return ever achieved for a charitable organization pursuing treatments for disease." The deal raised money which the CFF will use to fund its efforts as part of a venture philanthropy model.

The firm went public in June 2020.
