= Dakkah =

A group of people sitting on a Dakkah in Old Jeddah (Al-Balad), Saudi Arabia

Dakkah (Arabic: دكة, also spelled dikka) is a type of elevated earthen platform attached to the house that is typically found outside. Sometimes situated in a public area, the dakkah is covered with mats and can be shaded by palm frond walls or a tent. It could also take the form of benches or couches along the outside of a structure. Dakkahs were very common in the traditional buildings of the Arab World, particularly in the Arab states of the Persian Gulf, with people gathering on dakkahs to socialize and drink Arabic coffee, functionally serving as an outdoor majlis.

Despite being situated in an open space, the dakkah does not cater to the public; instead, it is intended as a semi-private space for those in the immediate social circle of the householder. This is exemplified by the common privacy measures of erecting walls or tents to enclose it from the public.

The dakkah is often found in rural settings, where the house faces a farm or an open space. It is used for informal visits, whereas the majlis is for formal ones.

== See also ==
- Dikka
