= Pablo Legorreta =

Mexican-American businessman

Pablo Legorreta (born in 1963/1964) is a Mexican-American billionaire businessman, and the founder of Royalty Pharma PLC, the "world's biggest acquirer of pharmaceutical royalty streams." In 2023, Legoretta's total compensation from Royalty Pharma was $84.8 million.

Legorreta earned a Bachelor of Science in Engineering from Universidad Iberoamericana.

Legorreta is married, with two children, and lives in Sag Harbor, New York.
