= César Armando Librado Legorreta =

Mexican serial killer (born 1982)

- Born: June 1982 (age 44); Tenango del Valle, Mexico
- Other names: "El Coqueto"; Luis Santana García
- Conviction: Murder
- Penalty: 240 years imprisonment

Details
- Victims: 8 (1 survival)
- Span of crimes: 2011–2012
- Country: Mexico
- State: Greater Mexico City

César Armando Librado Legorreta (born 1982 in Tenango del Valle) is a Mexican serial killer known as El Coqueto, who was convicted of six rapes and murders of women in the Greater Mexico City.

== Modus operandi ==
Legoretta's modus operandi was to take advantage of his job as a driver on Route 2 that ran from Metro Chapultepec to Tlalnepantla de Baz, where late at night and early in the morning he would rape and kill women aged between 17 and 34. To gain his victims' trust, he simulated that his vehicle had broken down; he would then drop off all the passengers except one girl, who he'd offer to take outside if she wanted to help fix the problem, but before arriving at the place he would change the route, rape the girl and kill her afterwards, dropping her body in the Tlalnepantla channel. Sometimes this method would vary, since the victim would be the last passenger before arriving at the destination.

== Capture and evasion ==
Legorreta lived in the municipality of Tultitlán with his wife and two children and worked as a driver on Route 2 through public transport driving a minibus with registration 712TL066, where he committed his murders. According to the investigation folder that was made after his capture and trial, his first crime was committed on July 14, 2011, his second on November 26, his third on December 13, and his fourth on December 30. His last two murders were committed on January 8 and 18, 2012, respectively.

Initially he was captured on February 26 in the Federal District, and was arrested and transferred to the facilities of the Deputy Attorney General's Office, based in Barrientos de la Vega.

He was connected to eight feminicides committed in the Metropolitan Area in which the killer was driving a minibus that ran from Valle Dorado to Chapultepec, but he evaded the facilities of the Attorney General's Office of the State of Mexico. The authorities offered a million pesos for information leading to the arrest of Librado Legoretta. Finally, on March 3, 2012, agents of Magdalena Contreras borough learned his location. With the reforms to the Penal Code of the State of Mexico at the end of the year 2011, if convicted, it would be the first case of life imprisonment for rape and feminicide in Mexico.

== Escape and recapture ==
Legorreta escaped from the Deputy Attorney General of Tlalnepantla; after the PGJEM reported that he had been arrested for multiple rapes and homicides over the weekend, early one morning he escaped with the help of his guards, state prosecutor Alfredo Castillo confirmed. He explained that by not having the figure of arraigo, detainees can only be cared for but without violating their individual guarantees, so in any oversight, such as this case, they can escape.

He further explained that in the early hours of Sunday morning to Monday, the agent of Public Ministry realized that both the detainee and the three ministerial policemen were not in the facilities. After the release of the news, the police started tracking them down.

"This Tuesday at dawn one of the three ministerial policemen was arrested, saying that upon realizing that this person had jumped off out of a window and knowing they would be blamed, they fled as not to be detained", Castillo Cervantes said.

Despite the error, the prosecutor said that in the next few hours Armando will be arrested because his arrest was after months of investigation, so "we have it perfectly located, now it will be easier to stop him".

He said that they discharged the ministerial policemen for negligence and attempting to flee.

Finally, on Saturday, March 3, 2012, agents of the Attorney General's Office of the State of Mexico in Magdalena Contreras recaptured Legorreta.

== Sentence ==
On December 12, 2012, Legoretta was convicted and sentenced to 240 years in prison for the rape and murder of six women.

== See also ==
- Female homicides in Ciudad Juárez
- List of serial killers by country
