= Víctor Legorreta =

Mexican architect (born 1966)

Víctor Legorreta Hernández
- Born: 10 December 1966 (age 58); Mexico City, Mexico
- Occupation: Architect
- Practice: LEGORRETA®

Víctor Legorreta Hernández (Mexico City, born 10 December 1966) is a Mexican architect, son of the architect Ricardo Legorreta Vilchis.

== Career ==
Víctor obtained a degree in architecture from the Universidad Iberoamericana in Mexico City. After doing summer internships with Leason Pomeroy & Associates in Irvine, United States; Martorell, Bohigas and Mackay in Barcelona, and Fumihiko Maki in Japan, he joined his father at Legorreta Architects in 1989, where they worked together.

Two years later he became a partner in Legorreta Architects, (currently LEGORRETA), since 2001 he is a partner, managing and design director. He has lectured at universities and congresses in the United States, Latin America, Europe and Middle East. He has also served on several juries, including the Design Award of the American Institute of Architects (AIA).

== Awards ==
In 2007, Víctor was distinguished as an Honorary Fellow of the American Institute of Architects (AIA). In 2011 he was named Full Member of the National Academy of Architecture, Chapter Valley of Mexico and in 2012 he became President of the Interclub Mexico for the International Architecture Academy (IAA). Also this year, he was distinguished as Honorary Fellow Member of the Iberoamerican Council of Interior Designers (CIDI). Iberoamerican CIDI Career Development Award of Excellence in Architecture, Interior and Design. And CIDI American Award Architect of the Year as a Professional Mexico – International.

In 2018 he received the “CDMX Trajectories” Award from Mexico Design Magazine, for his work on LEGORRETA.

== Work ==
=== In Mexico ===
==== Finished ====
- 1993, El Papalote – Children's Museum, Mexico City.
- 1994, Universidad Autónoma de Nuevo León Library, Monterrey.
- 1998, Televisa Corporate Offices, Mexico City.
- 2001, EGADE Business Administration Graduate School ITESM, Monterrey.
- 2005, Juárez Complex: Superior Court of Justice and Ministry of Foreign Affairs, Mexico City.
- 2008, The Labyrinth Museum of Arts and Sciences, San Luis Potosi.
- 2010, Postgraduate Building, Faculty of Economics, UNAM. Mexico City.
- 2011, Zambrano Hellion Medical Center ITESM, Monterrey.
- 2016, BBVA Bancomer Headquarter, in partnership with Rogers Stirk Harbour + Partners. Mexico City.
- 2018, Ruta del Bosque Complex, Mexico.
- 2018, Casa Grande, Los Cabos.

==== Still in process ====
- Miyana Mixed-Use Complex, Mexico City.
- Four Seasons Tamarindo, in partnership with Taller de Arquitectura Mauricio Rocha + Gabriela Carrillo, Jalisco.
- Mozaiko Lindavista Complex, Mexico City.
- Vidarte Mixed-Use Complex, State of Mexico.
- La Gota Mixed-Use Complex, Querétaro.
- Puerto Paraíso, Los Cabos.
- Elite Residences, Rosedal, Mexico City.
- Barrio Santiago Mixed-Use Complex, Querétaro.
- Puerta Bajío Mixed-Use Complex, León.
- Cantera Complex, Monterrey.

=== In the World ===
==== Finished ====
- 1995, San Antonio Central Library, Texas.
- 1997, Schwab Residential Center, Stanford University, California.
- 1998, The Tech Museum of Innovation, San Jose, California.
- 1999, Chiron Life & Science Laboratories, Emeryville, California.
- 1999, College of Santa Fe Visual Arts Center, New Mexico, U.S.A.
- 2000, Mexican Pavilion Hannover Universal Expo, Germany.
- 2001, Zandra Rhodes Museum, London.
- 2001, Max Palevsky Residence Hall, Chicago.
- 2005, Sheraton Bilbao Hotel, Spain.
- 2005, Multiplaza Center, El Salvador
- 2007, El Roble Offices, El Salvador and Costa Rica.
- 2007, HBKU Texas A&M Engineering College, Doha, Qatar.
- 2009, Campus Center & Student Housing for the American University in Cairo, Egypt.
- 2009, HBKU Carnegie Mellon College of Business & Computer Science, Doha, Qatar.
- 2009, Fort Worth Museum of Science and History, Texas, U.S.A.
- 2011, HBKU Georgetown School of Foreign Services, Doha, Qatar.
- 2011, HBKU Student Center, Doha, Qatar.
- 2015, Otay: Cross Border Xpress, Tijuana, San Diego, California.
- 2016, Highland Hall Residencesfor the Graduate School of Business in Stanford University, California.

==== Still in process ====
- Plaza Mexico Residences, Los Ángeles, California.
- Hospital in East Africa.
- University in East Africa.
