= Dikka =

Structure found in a mosque

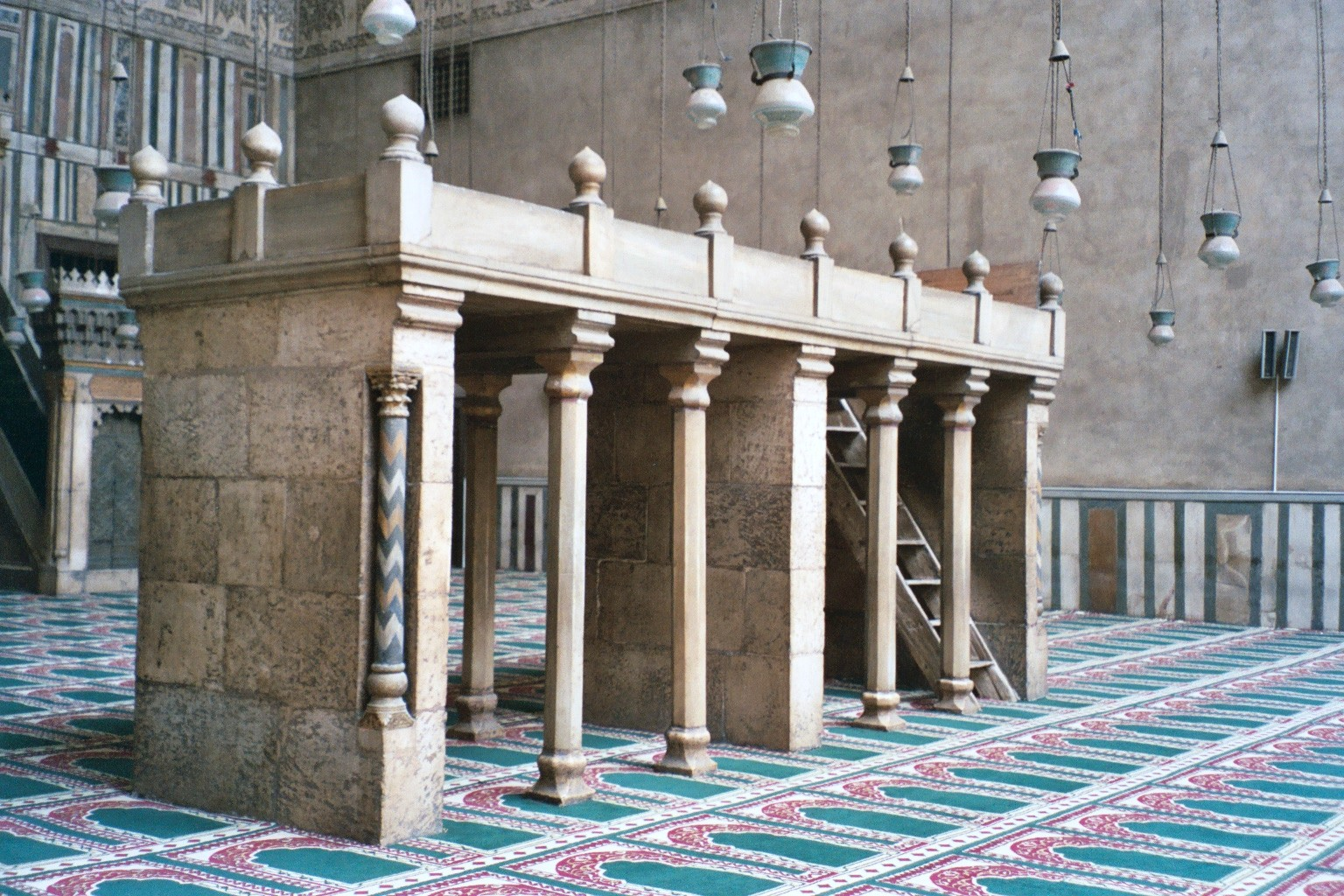
The dikka in the Mosque of Sultan Hasan in Cairo

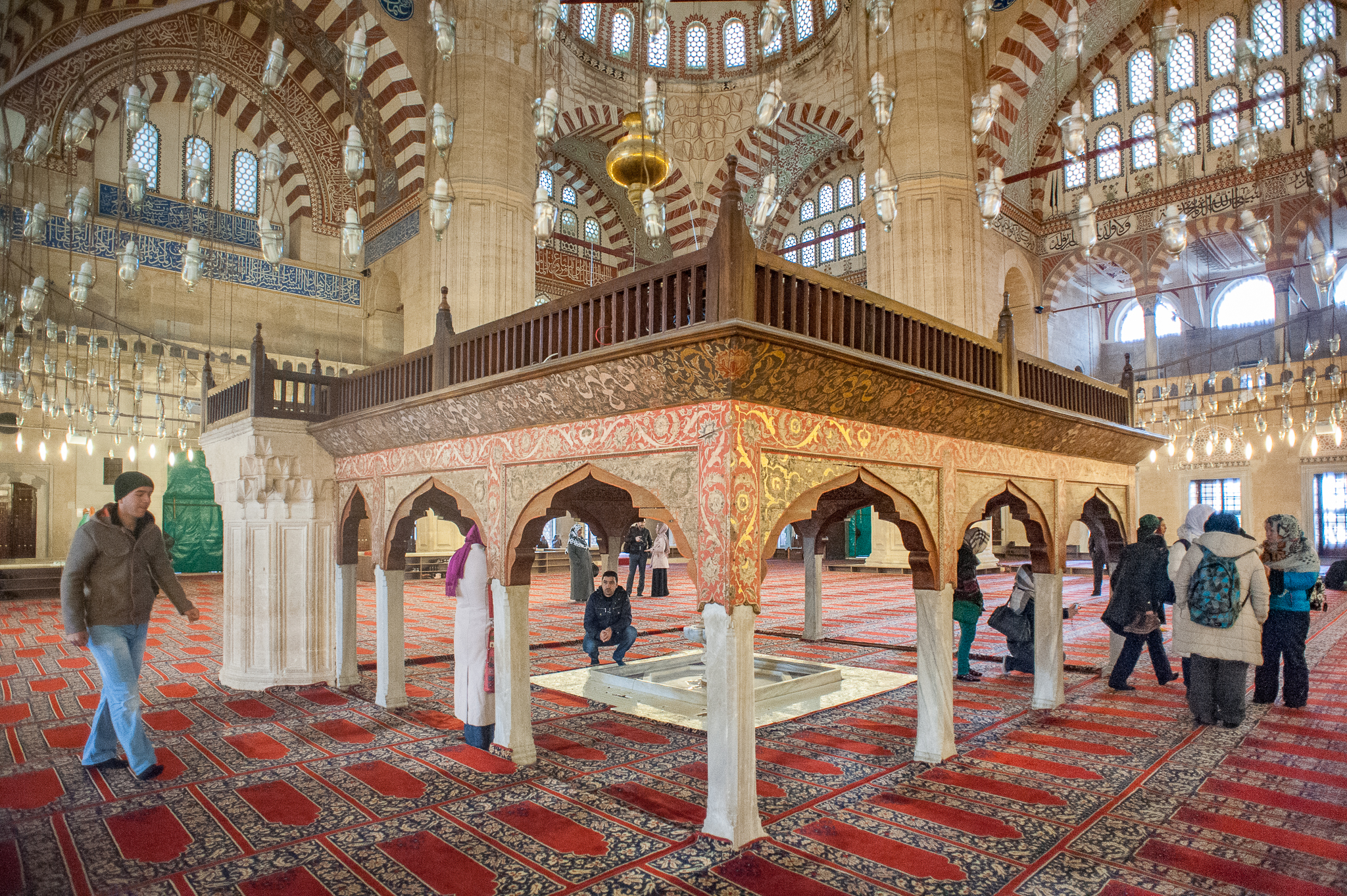
The müezzin mahfili in the Selimiye Mosque of Edirne, Turkey

A dikka or dakka (Arabic: دكة), also known in Turkish as a müezzin mahfili, is a raised platform or tribune in a mosque from which the Quran is recited and where the muezzin chants or repeats in response to the imam's prayers. It is also used by the muezzin to chant the second call to prayer (iqama), which indicates to worshippers that the prayer is about to begin. On special occasions or evenings, such as during the month of Ramadan, expert or professional Qur'an reciters also use the platform to chant parts of the Qur'an. It is also known as the mukabbariyah (Arabic: مكبرية) in the Prophet's Mosque in Medina.

This feature is not found in all mosques but is most often found in large mosques where it is difficult for worshippers far from the mihrab to hear the imam. Raised on columns, it can be a freestanding structure near the middle of the prayer hall or a balcony set against a pillar or a wall opposite the minbar.

== See also ==
- Dakkah
