= Qatar Museums =

Qatar government entity

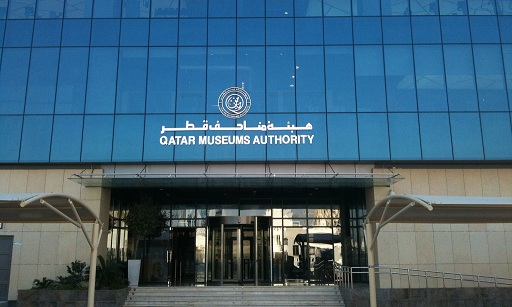
- Front view of "The QM Tower, Qatar Museums building in Doha, Qatar"
- Established: 2005
- Location: Doha, Qatar
- Coordinates: 25°17′19.1″N 51°32′45.33″E
- Chairperson: Sheikha Al-Mayassa bint Hamad bin Khalifa Al Thani
- Public transit access: QM Tower, Al Meena Street, Doha, Qatar PO Box 2777.
- Website: qm.org.qa

Qatar Museums (formerly the Qatar Museums Authority) was founded in 2005 and is a Qatari government entity that oversees the Museum of Islamic Art (MIA), Mathaf: Arab Museum of Modern Art, MIA Park, QM Gallery at the Katara Cultural Village, ALRIWAQ DOHA Exhibition Space, the Al Zubarah World Heritage Site Visitor Centre, and archaeological projects throughout Qatar, as well as the development of future projects and museums that will highlight its collections across multiple areas of activity including Orientalist art, photography, sports, children's education, and wildlife conservation.

== Governance ==
Qatar Museums is overseen by a board of trustees headed by Sheikha Al-Mayassa bint Hamad bin Khalifa Al-Thani. The CEO of QM is Mohammed Al Rumaihi. Qatar Museums also hosted the 2024 GCC meeting, with Al Rumaihi as the chairperson.

== Cultural policy ==
Qatar Museums is a key implementer of Qatari cultural policies, in cooperation with the Ministry of Culture, Arts and Heritage.

=== Qatar's National Vision 2030 ===
Qatar Museums is one of the organizations carrying out Qatar's National Vision 2030 program for comprehensive development, progress and prosperity for Qatar. Heritage-led developments play a key role in this program in an effort to combine modernization with local culture and traditions. The goal. is to maintain Arab and Islamic identity while showing openness towards other cultures. Sheikha Al Mayassa's mission is for Qatar Museums to turn Qatar into a cultural powerhouse. The Economist reported that a trustee said: “Above all, we want the QMA to be a ‘cultural instigator', a catalyst of arts projects worldwide”. The implementation of cultural policies by the QMA contributed to Doha being named the Arab Capital of Culture in 2010, an initiative taken by the Arab League under the UNESCO. In October 2023 Qatar Museums joined the UNWTO, an organisation promoting sustainable, responsible as well as accessible tourism. The Museum also participated at the 28th Conference of the parties in late 2023. The National Vision 2030 also includes plans for more sustainability, such as reducing waste and water usage, increasing recycling, and use of energy from renewable sources.

=== Membership of the UNESCO World Heritage Committee ===
The Qatar Museums Authority was the bid leader for Qatar's successful candidature to join the UNESCO World Heritage Committee in 2011. Qatar also had its first World Heritage site, Al Zubarah Archaeological Site, inscribed during the afternoon session of the UNESCO World Heritage Committee on 22 June 2013 in Phnom Penh, Cambodia.

== Current and future museums ==
Qatar Museums' museums have received worldwide attention, particularly the Museum of Islamic art (MIA), putting themselves in line with other museum developments in the area such as Abu Dhabi's (UAE) projected Guggenheim Abu Dhabi and Louvre Abu Dhabi.

The Museum of Islamic Art with Doha skyline in the background

Critics such as Hans-Ulrich Obrist, director of London's Serpentine Gallery, have argued that Doha takes a different approach to museums from that of Abu Dhabi, aspiring to a new model that does not "copy existing models or replicate western museums, but acknowledges local difference". Martyn Best, director of Cultural Innovations said that "Qatar is the furthest ahead in thinking about how to develop a contemporary Middle Eastern model", searching for a new paradigm for the museums of the 21st century.

All the museums developed by Qatar Museums have included Islamic or Qatari elements either in their architectural design or in their overall concept. In this way its strives in the creation of its own brand trying not to be too commercial. This policy is a reflection of the Qatar Foundation's fourth pillar 'community development' which strives to help foster a progressive society while also enhancing cultural life, protecting Qatar's heritage and addressing immediate social needs in the community. Qatar Museums has repeatedly chosen world-famous foreign architects to design its museums but they insist the architects sought inspiration in Middle Eastern architectural models.

=== Museum of Islamic Art (MIA) ===
View of the MIA from the inside

The MIA was opened in 2008. The museum includes two floors of permanent exhibition galleries, one main temporary gallery, two outdoor courtyards overlooking the city's skyline, an education center, a library, as well as a vast atrium area with a café and a gift shop.

Jodidio, author of the first publication on MIA describes it as the development that will "bridge the gap between tradition and modernity, highlighting the power of culture to transcend differences and cross artificial barriers" inscribing it in the Qatar Foundation's fourth pillar.

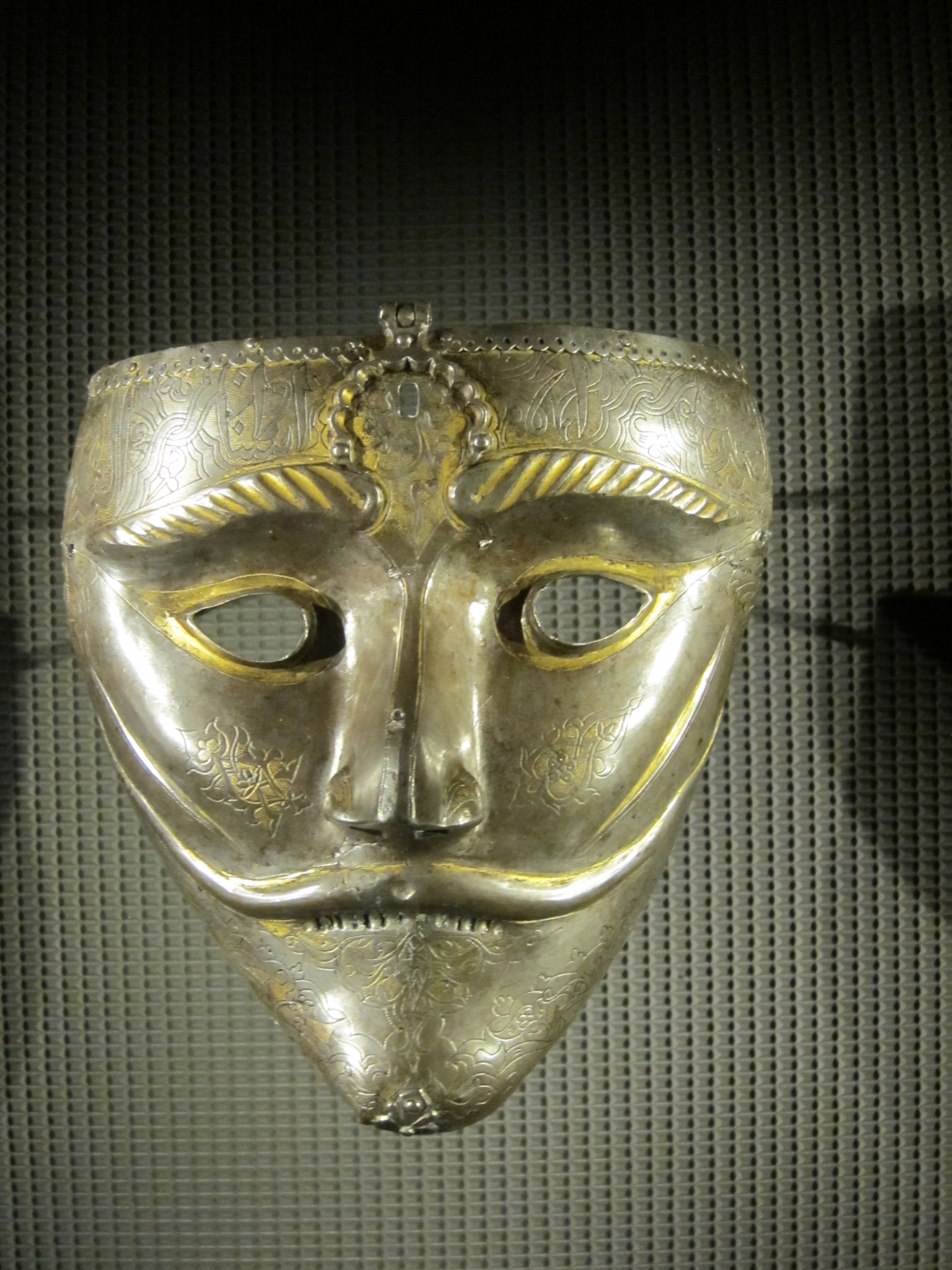
War mask from the MIA collection

==== MIA Park ====
Adjacent to the Museum of Islamic Art is the MIA Park, a 280,000 square meter seafront, crescent-shaped park designed by the Pei Partnership Architects of New York City. It includes a sculpture plaza featuring a commissioned work by US Artist Richard Serra titled "7”, the artist's first public work in the Middle East.

MIA Park hosts public activities such as film screenings, sport events, musical events and public programs. Starting in 2012, a bazaar was held once a month at the park excluding the summer months. From 2014 on it was held twice a week. Due to the Covid-19 pandemic it was paused from 2022 until 2023.

=== National Museum of Qatar ===
The new National Museum of Qatar (NMoQ) opened to the public on March 28, 2019. The museum features an innovative design by Pritzker Prize-winning architect Jean Nouvel that is inspired by the desert rose and grows organically around the original 20th century palace of Sheikh Abdullah Bin Jassim Al Thani. This important monument to Qatar's past is now preserved as the heart of the new NMoQ. The relation between the new and old building is part of creating the bridge between the past and the present advocated by Sheikha Al Mayassa for it is the way to "define ourselves instead of forever being defined by others... celebrating our identity." The old NMoQ was opened from 1975 to 2004.

Located on a 1.5 million-square-foot site at the south end of Doha Corniche, the NMoQ building rises from the sea and is connected to the shore by two pedestrian bridges and a road bridge. The building has an area of 52,000 square meters and holds 11 galleries.

=== 3-2-1 Qatar Olympic and Sports Museum ===
The 3-2-1 Qatar Olympic and Sports Museum is a national and international center for sports history, heritage, and knowledge to preserve, store, investigate and exhibit sports and sports objects. It opened to the public on 31 March 2022. In September 2022, the museum hosted an exhibition called "World of Football".

=== Mathaf: Arab Museum of Modern Art ===
The modern and contemporary focused, 5,500-square-meter Mathaf: Arab Museum of Modern Art was opened in 2010 in an old school building in Doha’s Education City. The museum started with collection by Sheikh Hassan bin Mohamed Al Thani, which grew to over 9,000 items, including the world’s largest selection of modern and contemporary Arab art.

=== Art Mill, Lusail Museum, Qatar Auto Museum ===
In 2022, three new facilities were announced.

The first of these facilities is Art Mill: a campus that will include exhibition galleries for modern and contemporary art and space for educational and residential programs. The campus will be built on the site of a historic flour mill and designed by architect Alejandro Aravena (Elemental) and it is expected to open in 2030. The Art Mill Museum coordinated the "Beyti Beytak. My Home is Your Home. La mia casa è la tua casa" exhibition at the 19th International Architecture Exhibition from May to November 2025. The museum also organised "MANZAR: Art and Architecture from Pakistan, 1940s to Today" at the NMoQ from November 2024 to January 2025.

In addition, the Lusail Museum, designed by Jacques Herzog (Herzog & De Meuron) and to be located on the Al Maha Island, will feature a large collection of Oriental drawings, paintings, photographs, sculptures and applied arts. The Director of the Museum is Dr. Julia Gonnella. The museum is also planned as a think tank addressing "ideas around colonialism and post-colonialism". In February 2024 new photos and a video of the building were released. In June 2025, QM showed models of planned cultural venues at Art Basel 2025, including one of the museum.

Third, the Qatar Auto Museum will feature permanent galleries, all centered around the automobile and its development in Qatar with an added center for the restoration of classic cars. The museum was designed by architect Rem Koolhaas (OMA). The Qatar Auto Museum held an exhibition titled "The Bicycle: the Future of Mobility" in partnership with the 2023 Expo Doha. A section of the collection from the museum was showcased at the 2023 Geneva Motor Show in Qatar. The president of the museum is Hessa Al Jaber.

Exhibitions showcasing the plans and designs were also held for each museum. The exhibition for the Art Mill Museum was held at the Qatar Flour Mills Warehouse October 2022 to March 2023, the exhibition for the Lusail Museum was opened from November 2022 to April 2023 at the ALRIWAQ Gallery. From April 2022 to January 2023 the National Museum of Qatar hosted the "A Sneak Peek at Qatar Auto Museum Project" exhibition, with a second showcase being held from October 2022 to December 2023 at the Al Zubarah Fort. A third showcase for the Qatar Auto Museum is held at the NMoQ from February 2026 to February 2027.

=== Dadu Children's Museum ===
Announced during the 2023 La Biennale di Venezia the Museum designed by the Dutch UNStudios is set to open in 2029. According to Qatar Museums, the museum wants to provide children a place to play and learn in different galleries that are centred around a central plaza. The name also reflects the intent of the museum, as dadu means play in Arabic. The museum is publicly funded by private donors as well as cooperations like the Turkish Dodus Group or ExxonMobil Qatar. In December 2025, QM and Dukhan Bank announced a partnership to support the museum. President of the advisory committee is Mohammed Saleh Al Sada. The Dadu Gardens were opened during the Expo 2023 Doha in the Al-Bidda Park. In January 2025, the museum received the HundrED Award for its A-Z Ramadan Cards project. In December 2025, QM and the NMACC signed a five year partnership "as part of Dadu's Museum-in-Residence programme".

=== Orientalist collection ===
The Orientalist collection is one of the most significant collections of Orientalist art ever assembled in the world. It is the only institution in the world dedicated solely to Orientalist art. It comprises paintings, watercolours, sculptures and drawings, which trace Orientalism back to the early 16th century.

The Orientalist collection aims to map an influential period in art history through future programmes and exhibitions and further appreciation and understanding of the relationship between East and West. Significant artworks are loaned to international museums for exhibitions on a regular basis. Work is also displayed in exhibitions organised by the Orientalist collection in Doha and abroad.

There was previously an intention to create an Orientalist Museum, however as of 2019 this proposal is on hold.

== Galleries, exhibition spaces and venues ==
=== QM Gallery ===
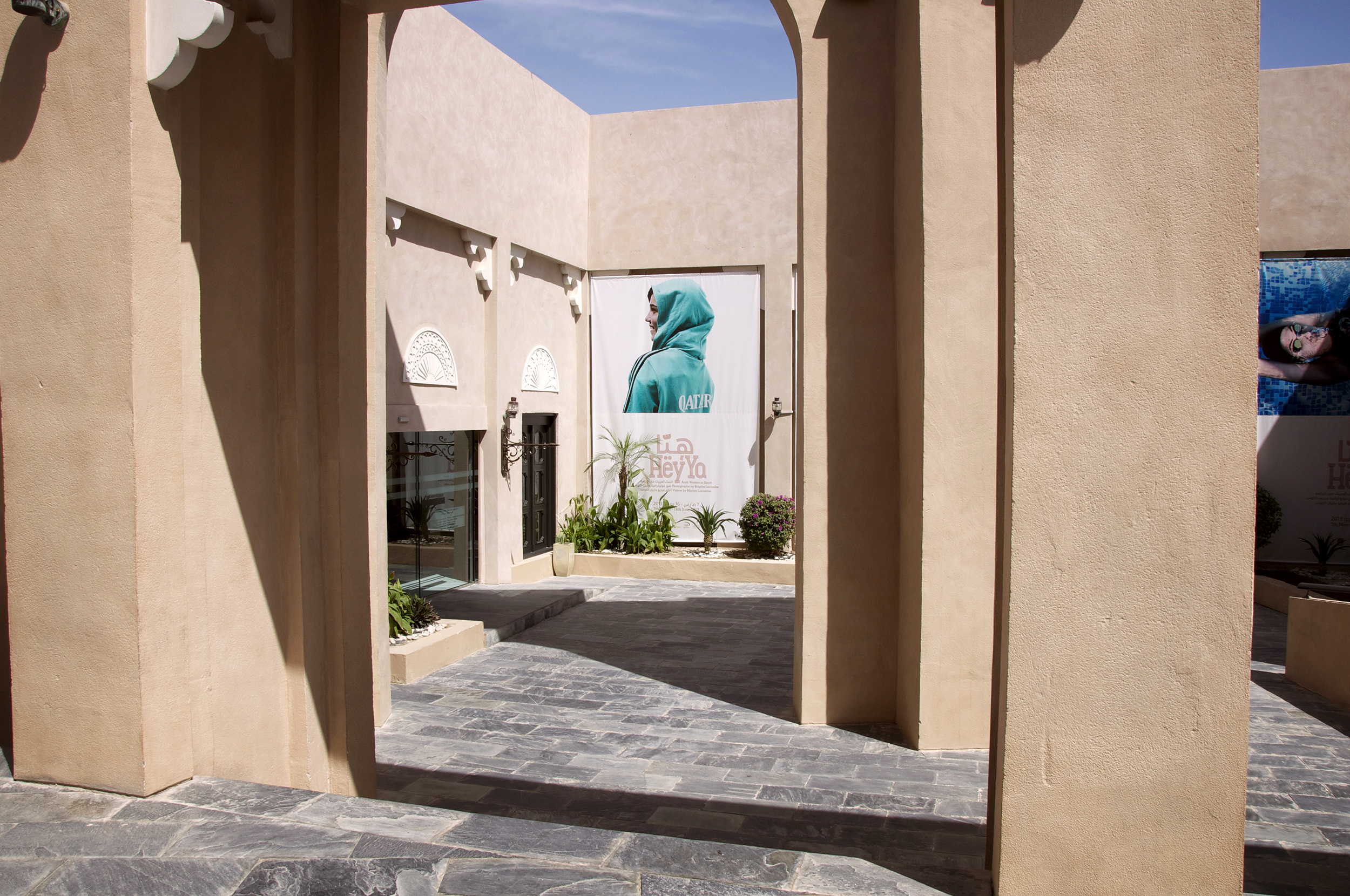
QMA Gallery

QM Gallery was founded in 2010 as a space for temporary exhibitions organized by Qatar Museums. Located in the Katara Cultural Village, Building 10, the gallery is a platform for the upcoming museums in Qatar to present their collections, projects, and visions. The gallery also hosts exhibitions of Qatari artists and organizes international exhibitions. The wide range of the exhibitions – such as photography, archaeology, art, sports, architecture and sculpture – makes Qatar Museums Gallery a place of encounter for a broad local and international audience.

==== Temporary exhibitions at the Katara Gallery ====
- "Yan Pei-Ming: Painting the History", October 2012 to January 2013.
- "Francesco Vezzoli: Museum of Crying Women", October 2013 to November 2013.
- "Silks from the Silk Road – Chinese Art of Silk", curated by Xue Yan, March 2016 to May 2016.
- "Labour of Love: Embroidering Palestinian History", October to 2022 to January 2023.

=== ALRIWAQ DOHA Exhibition Space ===
Located next to the Museum of Islamic Art, ALRIWAQ DOHA is another temporary exhibition space by Qatar Museums covering a total area of 5000 square-meter. Inaugurated in December 2010, ALRIWAQ DOHA provides a venue for local exhibitions by Qatar Museums' museums and departments displaying their historic objects and collections, as well as shows by international artists organized by QM in line with its vision to be a cultural instigator seeking to stimulate debate and discussion. QM announced Rubaiya Qatar in 2026 as a multidisciplinary, contemporary art quadrennial with a central theme under ALRIWAQ Art + Architecture. The first edition is planned to run from November 2026 to April 2027.

==== Temporary exhibitions at the ALRIWAQ Gallery ====
- "Takashi Murakami: Ego", February 2012 to June 2012.
- "Damien Hirst: Relics", October 2013 to January 2014.
- "Luc Tuymans: Intolerance", October 2015 to January 2016.
- "What About the Art?: Contemporary Art from China", Curated by Cai Guo-Qiang, March 2016 to July 2016.
- "I am the cry, who will give voice to me? * Dia al-Azzawi: A Retrospective (from 1963 until tomorrow)", October 2016 to April 2017.
- “Jeff Koons: Lost in America”, curated by Massimiliano Gioni, November 2021 to March 2022.
- "Dan Flavin | Donald Judd: Doha", October 2023 to February 2024.
- "I. M. Pei: Life Is Architecture", October 2025 to February 2026.

=== Fire Station: Artists in Residence ===
The Fire Station: Artists in Residence program is hosted by Qatar Museums Public Arts Department. This program took the iconic old Civil Defense building in Doha and is transforming it into an open space for creativity. Designed by Qatari architect, Ibrahim Al Jaidah, the Fire Station has 24 studios and a 700 sq. m gallery, housed in the old garage, to be used by artists participating in the program as well as the local community. It also hosts a café, restaurant, bookshop, art supply shop, a cinema, and artist facilities.

This project "will allow for cultural dialogue and exchange between artists living in Qatar and the rest of the world." The rolling nine-month program will be open to Qataris and other artists in the Persian Gulf region, as well as international artists based in Qatar.

=== M7 ===
M7 was established by Qatar Museums in 2021 and is located in the district of Msheireb in Doha. The name consist of an "M" for Mshereib and a "7" for the seven principles QM aims to achieve with the project. The M7 building contains shops, cafes, studios as well as co-working spaces. Exhibitions held at the building include "Masterpieces of Furniture Design", "ICONE: Voices of Design Made in Italy", "Christian Dior: Designer of Dreams" and "Forever Valentino". In October 2024 the "Ellsworth Kelly at 100" exhibition was opened in commemoration of Ellsworth Kelly. The exhibition was organized by the Glenstone Museum in Maryland, US and ran until February 2025. In October 2025, M7 hosted three exhibitions: Houbara Haven Tiara, Amazigh Hair Couture and FTA: Threads of Impact. In February 2026, a fair organised by Art Basel was held at M7 and within the Doha Design District. The fair focused on South Asian, Middle Eastern and North African modern and contemporary art.

=== Liwan Design Studios and Labs ===
QM converted a former all girls school in Msheireb into the Liwan Design Studios and Labs in 2022. The building housed the first all girls school Banat El Doha, later renamed Umm Almo’mneen Primary School for Girls, from 1956 until 2005. Afterwards it was used as the Msheireb Art Centre, until renovations began in 2019. The building contains the Liwan Archival Library, consisting of 850 children’s books and objects from the former school as well as studios for up too three residents, the TypeAraby, Qatar Preparatory School and the Al Mafyar heritage revival project. In 2024, a new hall was opened with the permanent “Honor the Past, to Celebrate the Future: Qatar’s Educational Vision” exhibit.

=== Other temporary exhibitions ===
- "POW! WOW! Festival“, Al Sadd Metro Station, November 2021 to December 2021.
- "Your Ghosts Are Mine: Expanded Cinema, Amplified Voices", ACP Palazzo Franchetti, April 2024 to November 2024.
- "Art for Stories", Place Vendôme in Lusail, June 2024.
- "untitled 2026 (a gathering of remarkable people)", La Biennale di Venezia, May 2026 to November 2026.

=== Tasweer Photo Festival Qatar ===
The Tasweer Photo Festival Qatar was established in 2021 by Qatar Museums. The festival is meant to increase acknowledgment of the photographic communities in Qatar, Western Asia and North Africa. It is made up of various exhibitions, presentations and workshops, as well as awards and commissions and takes place every two years, with the second event running from March to May 2023. The festival also collaborated with Doha Fashion Fridays in 2023, showcasing works from the projects at M7. Other exhibition included "A Chance To Breathe" at M7, "I Am The Traveler And Also The Road" at the Mathaf, Hadeer Omar's "And Thereafter" at the Al Koot Fort as well as Mashael Al Hejazi's "My Mother Lulwa’s House" at Majlis Barahat Al Jufairi. During the event, the annual Sheikh Saoud Al Thani Project Award and the Sheikh Saoud Al Thani Single Image Award were handed out, with six artist receiving a Project Award and ten artist a Single Award. The third edition of the festival opened in April 2025 and included "As I Lay Between Two Seas" and seven further exhibitions across five venues.

=== Design Doha ===
The first biennial Design Doha took place in February 2024, featuring over 100 designers from the Middle East and North African region in various applications such as graphic design or architecture. During the first week six exhibitions were opened by Qatar Museums. Three commissioned artworks were presented during the event: Afterimage of the Beginning by Choi Byung-hoon, Desert by Amine El Gotaibi, and Doha Dragon by Joris Laarman. Design Doha awarded prizes in the categories Furniture Design, Interior Design, Product Design and Craft at the end of the event.

== Archaeology, architectural conservation and cultural tourism ==
Since its establishment, Qatar Museums has managed several archaeological and architectural conservation projects such as surveys, excavations, restoration, rehabilitation projects. These efforts helped uncover, document, protect and promote many archaeological sites, forts, towers, mosques and old buildings across Qatar preserving, therefore, the country's culture and heritage. The historic school Al-Jamiliya was restored by the Qatar Museum’s Architectural Conservation Department between summer 2023 and May 2024 and will be used for cultural events.

Qatar also supports archaeological sites in Sudan through the Qatar-Sudan Archaeological Project, with QM helping transport people to the sites as well as supporting Sudanese academic institutions.

=== Al Zubarah: A UNESCO World Heritage Site ===
Al Zubarah lies approximately 100 km north-west of Doha. Founded in ca. 1760 by the Banu Utba tribe from Kuwait, Al Zubarah's location in the central Persian Gulf predestined it to become the premier pearling and trading town in this region after the demise of Basra in Iraq.

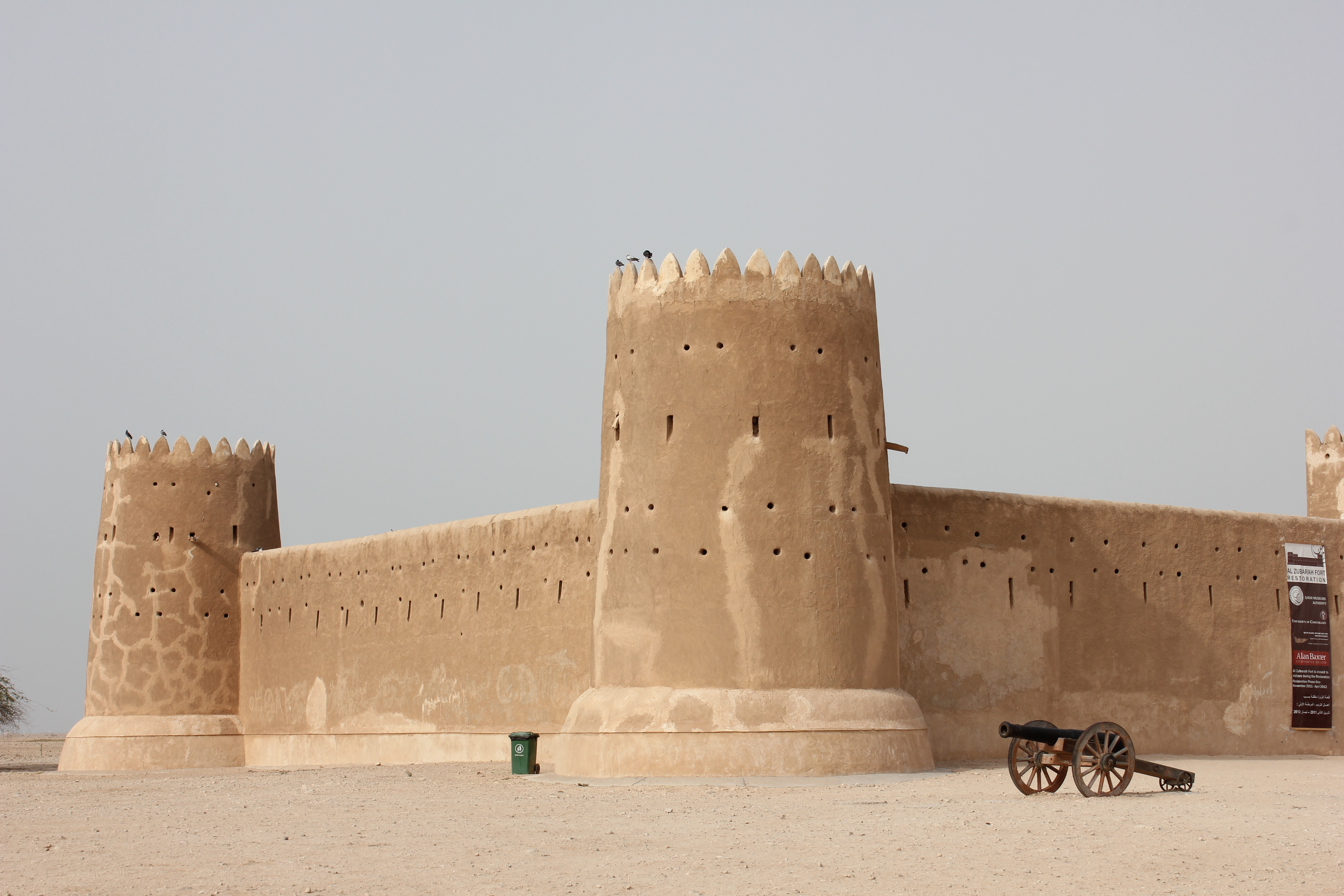
View of Al Zubarah Fort

Covering an area of 60 hectares, Al Zubarah Archaeological Site is the first entry for a Qatari site on the international register and one of 911 natural and cultural properties worldwide.

First excavations in Al Zubarah were undertaken in 1980 by the National Council of Culture, Arts and Heritage and between 2002 and 2005 by Qatar Museums. Since 2009 a joint project between Copenhagen University and QM, the so-called Qatar Islamic Archaeology and Heritage Project, has led to large-scale excavations and restorations, as well as to historical, anthropological and environmental research efforts in Al Zubarah and its hinterland.

In April 2024, Qatar Museum announced the Al Zubarah Trashboom Project. The project launched several so-called Trash Booms around Al Zubarah, with the aim to reduce ocean pollution and the subsequent need for beach cleanings.

== Public art in Qatar ==
Qatar Museums' Public art department is responsible for creating an artist residency program for young local artists to help them develop their skills and horizons, organizing exhibitions featuring international artists and overseeing the installation of artwork by renowned artists in the public realm in Qatar. Sheikha Al Mayassa Bint Hamad Al Thani, QM Chairperson has said: “Through displaying various forms of art in public space, we aim to inspire local talent and establish an organic connection between art and the local community.” Artists in the programme include Fatma Al Sharshani.

== Cultural programmes ==
The remit of Qatar Museums goes beyond developing museums and art galleries and restoring archaeological sites to other activities, such as organizing and sponsoring various events locally and internationally. Notable examples of these are: the organization of the Doha Tribeca Film Festival in 2009, the installation of a Louise Bourgeois giant sculpture in the Qatar National Convention Center, the sponsoring of the World Cinema Foundation, the sponsoring of exhibitions abroad by international artists including Japanese artist Takashi Murakami's exhibition in Château de Versailles, and English artist and art collector Damien Hirst's exhibition at Tate Modern in 2012.

== Expo 2023 Doha ==
The 3-2-1 Qatar Olympic Sports Museum signed a collaboration with the Seashore Group on 14 February 2024 for "The 3-2-1 Sustainable Obstacle Course Challenge" at the Expo 2023. The NMoQ and Qatar Museum's Department of Archaeology hosted the "Traces of Qatar's Agricultural Past" exhibit at the Expo 2023 House from December 2023 to March 2024. The exhibit depicted Qatar's history of food production before industrial agriculture.

== International Museum Day ==
To celebrate the 2024 International Museum Day, Qatar Museums offered free admission to all QM museums for two days in May. In Addition, the 3-2-1 Qatar Olympic Sports Museum organized the "International Museum Day: The Power of Museums in Building a Sustainable Future" event and the MIA hosted the "International Museum Day: Shapes and Structures" workshop in cooperation with sculptor Adam Williamson.

== Response to the 2023 Gaza war ==
In October 2023, due to the Gaza war, Qatar Museum postponed its planned festivals and events as a sign of Palestinian solidarity, stating that "this is not a moment to celebrate", while also projecting the Palestinian flag on the exterior of the NMoQ and the MIA. Together with Qatar Red Crescent the museum organized a weekly fundraiser named "Art for Peace in Support of Palestine" from January 2024 to March 2024. The fundraiser aimed to raise awareness for the events in Gaza. In May 2024 the museum held an "Art for Peace" charity auction at the MIA. The raised funds were used to provide humanitarian aid to the Gaza Strip.

== Cultural Diplomacy Program ==
=== Qatar Japan 2012 ===
2012 marked 40 years of positive diplomatic relations between the state of Qatar and Japan. To celebrate this, a year-long series of cultural, sporting and business related activities were held under the banner of Qatar Japan 2012. The program put together for this year included exhibitions, events and activities in both countries such as Takashi Murakami’s exhibition "Ego" at ALRIWAQ DOHA exhibition space and "Pearls: Jewels from the Sea” exhibition in Kobe, Japan. The highlight event of Qatar Japan 2012 was "Qatar Week: Ferjaan in Tokyo" at Roppongi Hills, Tokyo, Japan, which was an occasion to foster understanding of Qatari culture and achievement, and offered opportunities for Japanese public to interact with Qatar through a variety of cultural activities.

=== Qatar UK 2013, Year of culture ===
Qatar UK 2013 was a project coordinated by the British Council and Qatar Museums, in association with several partners, including leading arts and education institutions in both countries. As well as building new relationships and supporting existing partnerships in education, sport and science, the year aimed to promote an awareness and appreciation of culture, achievements and heritage, and increased engagement between people and institutions in both countries in the spirit of innovation, openness and learning. The events and activities were taking place in both Qatar and the United Kingdom.

=== Qatar Brazil 2014 ===
Qatar Brazil 2014 was a year-long cultural exchange programme dedicated to connecting people in the State of Qatar and the Federative Republic of Brazil through culture, community, and sport. Qatar Brazil 2014 was announced in Brasilia on 18 December 2013 during Qatar National Day celebrations at the Qatar embassy in Brasilia, this cultural program aimed to strengthen bilateral relations and create lasting partnerships between Qatar and Brazil by working with partners and sponsors to bring exhibitions, festivals, competitions, and other cultural exchange activities to both countries. Qatar Brazil 2014 was held under the patronage of QM Chairperson Sheikha Al Mayassa bint Hamad bin Khalifa Al Thani, in partnership with Qatar's Ministry of Culture, Arts and Heritage. The year officially commenced on 27 January 2014 with a launch reception at the Museum of Islamic Art in Doha.

=== Qatar Turkey 2015 ===
The Qatar-Turkey 2015 Year of Cultural Exchange opened with a Turkish gala at the Museum of Islamic Art in Doha. As a symbol of the alliance, a "Qatar” Street was inaugurated in an area on the European side of Istanbul. At the Museum of Islamic Art Park in Doha, a Turkish festival and bazaar featured Turkish music and dance, an open air photo exhibition and cinema and a Turkish teahouse. Several art exhibitions were held, including one in Istanbul about beaded jewelry from Qatar and around the world and the Harem Al Sultan exhibition in Qatar. The joint exhibition "Artistic Journeys: New Angles; New Perspectives" displayed the photographic works of Qatari and Turkish photographers.

=== Qatar China 2016 ===
The Qatar-China 2016 Year of Culture opened in Doha with a Jiang’nan style show organized by Qatar Museums, the Ministry of Culture of the People's Republic of China and the Zhejiang Provincial Department of Culture. During China-Qatar 2016 Year of Culture, museums and galleries in Doha presented a series of cultural and artistic exhibitions featuring ancient and modern Chinese art. Additionally, a Chinese festival, which was held at the Islamic Museum of Art Park, provided Chinese markets, food stalls, a Chinese teahouse and various performances. The Islamic Museum of Art hosted the Treasures of China exhibition, which highlighted Chinese history and civilization. The photo exhibition “cultures from different angles” featured the work of four Chinese and two Qatari photographers, who traveled for two weeks to each other's home countries to learn about and visually convey a culture other than their own.

=== Qatar Germany 2017 ===
The Qatar-Germany 2017 Year of Culture was officially opened at the Katara Opera House with a concert of Qatari and German music. The German Embassy, together with the Goethe Institute and the Doha Film Institute, organized the German Film Week at the Museum of Islamic Art. The Minister of Culture and Sports, Salah bin Ghanim Al Ali, paid a visit to Germany's stall at the Doha International Book Fair, where Germany was the guest of honor. Siemens Qatar hosted an event for women on the theme of "Culture and Innovation" on International Women's Day. Furthermore, the German Embassy, the Goethe-Institut and the museums of Qatar organized a friendly match between women soccer teams from Germany and Qatar. In addition, Al Riwaq Gallery held the exhibition "Driven by German Design" while the Deutsche Bank Collection exhibited "German Encounters", a collection of German contemporary art.

=== Qatar Russia 2018 ===
On the occasion of the Qatar-Russia 2018 Year of Culture, a friendly football match between politicians and artists from Qatar and Russia was held in Moscow's Red Square on the sidelines of the 2018 FIFA World Cup. The two countries exchanged knowledge and ideas as part of the Year of Culture at the 7th International Cultural Forum in Saint Petersburg, with Qatar, a first-time attendee, being the guest of honor. At the "Identify Qatar: (No) Limits of Architecture" conference city planners discussed pioneering architectural projects in Qatar and looked at its most spectacular buildings. Furthermore, numerous art and design exhibitions were held including the publicly celebrated exhibition "Pearls, Treasures from the Seas and Rivers", which premiered 20 newly added pieces and was held at the State Historical Museum in Moscow. The Embassy of Qatar in Moscow organized a pop-up event of Qatari culture and food during the Russian summer music festival Afisha Picnic.

=== Qatar India 2019 ===
Among the artistic highlights of the India-Qatar cultural year 2019 were the exhibitions “Set in Stone: Gems and Jewels from royal Indian Courts” at the Museum of Islamic Art in Doha and “Where Cultures Meet”, an exhibition of photographs from a trip to India as part of the 2019 Year of Culture by two Qatari photographers at the Katara Cultural Village. Two Qatar-based Indian photographers also participated in the exhibition with their works. In addition, a Bollywood-style event was held at the Opera House in Katara, an indoor cricket league was held at the Lusail Sports Arena, and a yoga class was held at the National Museum of Qatar on International Yoga Day.

=== Qatar France 2020 ===
As a result of the COVID-19 pandemic, many of the planned events were moved to online platforms. To commemorate the 2020 Qatar-France Year of Culture and its contributions to cultural exchange between the two nations, the Qatar Ambassador to France was given a bronze medal by the Paris Mint. During the height of Covid lockdowns in May 2020, the Cultural Year organized an online Open Call Photo exhibition open to amateurs and professional photographers alike, depicting French and Qatari aspects. Among other events, Qatar Museums and Paris Saint Germain e-Sports organized an e-sports competition between the two countries in the run-up to the 2022 FIFA World Cup in Qatar. Additionally, Michelin-starred French chef Guillaume Sanchez shared homemade traditional Qatari recipes with Qatari and French visitors via video from his restaurant in Paris.

French literature became the focus of attention at the Doha International Book Fair and the best designs by successful Qatari design students from the Qatar Foundation were presented at the Maison et Objets international design fair in Paris. There were also several exhibitions. The Palais de Tokyo Museum in Paris hosted the QM exhibition Our World is Burning and the Musée national Picasso-Paris exhibited outstanding artworks from Picasso's studios at the Fire Station in Doha.

During the 2024 Summer Olympics, the museum organized two exhibitions in Paris as a followup to the 2020 Year of Culture and the 2014 Cultural agreement between Qatar and France. The first exhibition, "Esports: A Game Changer", focuses on the history and future of Esports, while the second exhibition, "Olympism: More Than a Dream", highlights the founder of the modern Olympics Pierre de Coubertin as well as Qatar's Olympic participation since 1984.

=== Qatar USA 2021 ===
The Qatar-USA 2021 Year of Culture program, spanning the whole of the year and encompassing events throughout multiple cultural sections, opened with a joint concert by the U.S. Air Forces Central Band and the Qatar Philharmonic Orchestra at the Katara Cultural Village Opera House.

As part of the Year of Culture, Qatar Museums presented its first exhibition of American artist Jeff Koons in the Gulf region. “Lost in America” shows American culture as experienced by Koons’ throughout his lifetime. The public art initiative JEDARIART of Portland, Oregon, brought Qatar-based artists and their works to the United States giving them a canvas for their murals throughout several cities, including San Francisco, Houston and Miami. The digital Pearls of Wonder exhibition held in New York City in December 2021, allowed visitors to see the Qatari pearl history in the eyes of modern-day artists, back to the time when Qatar was one of the world's main players in the pearl production industry. The Museum of Islamic Art in Doha loaned a collection of seventeenth century textiles and portraits, as well as illustrative manuscripts to the Arthur M. Sackler Gallery of the Smithsonian's National Museum of Asian Art in Washington, D.C. for an exhibition. An exhibition featured the work of an American and a Qatari photographer from a trip through the Pacific Northwest. The Qatar America Institute of Culture saw the Qatar-USA Cultural Year 2021 off with two exhibitions: Cultural Fusion, exhibiting the work of design students and Light & Shadow: A Visual Journey Through Oregon. Both lasting well into 2022 and laying the foundation for the future exchanges in arts and culture. Los Angeles hosted an evening of film screenings by Arab filmmakers. International Women's Day featured a live virtual forum on female empowerment with prominent Qatari and American women.

Furthermore, there were various sporting events, culinary experiences, educational programs, and joint business events.

=== Qatar MENASA 2022 ===
The 2022 Year of Culture, focusing for the first time on a region rather than a single country, was opened in the courtyard of the Fire Station Gallery with a mix of music, film and cuisine from Qatar and the MENASA region. On the day after the opening ceremony film and musical performances were open to the public at the Doha Film Institute.

Being inaugurated as part of Years of Culture the “Flag Plaza” hosts 119 flags and an installation called “Us, Her, Him” by the artist Najla El Zein showing the deep and complex interactions between humans. The Yearly held Indian Community Festival was also part of the 2022 Year Of Culture and took place in the Park of the Museum of Islamic Art, focusing on the differences within India through food, artworks and cultural programs. The 2 day long “Explore Sri Lanka” festival showed a variety of Sri Lankan Arts and handicrafts, as well as the history, religion and parts of Sri Lankan culture within the Education City in Doha. In December 2022 an exhibition dedicated to the Algerian artist Baya Mahieddine featuring 18 of her artworks was opened in the Qatar National Library. The MIA hosted “Baghdad: Eye’s Delight” primarily showcased the history of Baghdad between the 1940s and 1970s with 160 items, which in part came from other museums like the Louvre or the Metropolitan Museum of Art. Other exhibitions that were also part of the Qatar MENASA 2022 Year Of Culture included “Sophia Al-Maria: Invisible Labors”, focusing on the Qatari-American artist Sophia Al-Maria, “No Condition is Permanent”, showing Palestine artist Taysir Batniji's work, and “Majaz: Contemporary Art Qatar”, displaying five years of artworks from the Fire Station Gallery. The exhibition "On The Move", focusing on the historic life of nomadic shepherds of Qatar, Mongolia and the Central Sahara, was opened in October 2022 at the NMoQ and ran until January 2024. In May 2024 the exhibition was showcased at the National Museum of Mongolia, where it will stay until August 2024.

=== Qatar Indonesia 2023 ===
The 2023 Year of Culture was officially launched in March at the Museum of Islamic Art in Doha. Alongside the launch the Qatar International Food Festival featured a variety of Indonesian food, as well as several events in cooperation with the Indonesian company Javara. In preparation for the YOC the Museum of Islamic Art (MIA) hosted an exhibition with east Asian artifacts found in a sunk ship from 970 in two galleries.

In February the Indonesian Embassy hosted an event focusing on the traditional sport of Pencak Silat, which blends spiritual, mental and artistic aspects into a martial art form. The Qatar-Indonesia Horseback Archery Friendship competition was also held in February at the Al Samira Riding School. The Katara Opera House performed the "Hayati: Panji Searching for the Essence of Love" play at the end of May, depicting an Indonesian folklore tale about the essence of life. As part of the initiative Qatari chefs Noof Al Marri and Hassan Al Ibrahim visited four destinations in Indonesia to test various ethnic dishes as well as street foods and to be taught about traditional cooking techniques by local residents. The tour concluded at the Ubud Food Festival, where the two chefs were guests of honour. The exhibition "Growing Kopi, Drinking Qahwa" was opened at the National Museum of Qatar in October as part of the program, focusing on the coffee culture of the countries. The programme also included a volunteer mission by YOC and QMs' Community Service section, sending volunteers and artists to the SMKN 1 Rota Bayat School in Indonesia.

=== Qatar Morocco 2024 ===
The Qatar Morocco Year of Culture started in February 2024 at the Museum of Islamic Art with the opening of Berber Jewelry Collection exhibition. The exhibition consisted of over 200 items and it was the first time the jewelry collection was showcased outside of Morocco. The Katara Prize for Manuscripts and Archaeological Sites, hosted by the Katara Cultural Village, was launched in March 2024. The competition focuses on manuscript and archaeological research of a single country each year, with the inaugural year focusing on Morocco due to the ongoing year of culture. The Mathaf also showcases several galleries of Moroccan artworks and the 3-2-1 Olympic Museum highlights Moroccan athletes. The Dar Al Maghreb Pavilion was opened in the MIA Park in August 2024 and contains four areas showcasing various aspects of Moroccan history and culture. The NMoQ’s Jiwan restaurant collaborated with the Moroccan La Mamounia hotel in April 2024 and served Moroccan cuisine, while the MIA held lectures about Morocco's archaeological history in November. From November 2024 to January 2025 the MIA also hosted the "Crafting Design Futures" exhibition, showcasing works from nine Morocco and Qatar based artists. MIA also presented Splendours of the Atlas: A Voyage Through Morocco's Heritage from November 2024 to March 2025.

=== Qatar Argentina and Chile 2025 ===
The Qatar Argentina Chile Year of Culture (YOC) was officially inaugurated in April 2025 at the National Museum of Qatar, led by HE Sheikha Al Mayassa bint Hamad Al Thani, the chairperson of QM. The inauguration also saw the beginning of the museum's "Latino Americano | Modern and Contemporary Art from the Malba and Eduardo Costantini Collections" exhibition, which ran until July 2025. The exhibition features over 160 artworks by South American artists and was curated by Issa Al Shirawi and María Amalia García.

Earlier in the year, in February, several Argentinian and Chilean chefs demonstrated South American cuisine at the Qatar International Food Festival as part of the YOC. A six day volunteer trip to Matanzas, Chile, was organised in Autumn 2025. At the Doha Film Festival 2025, a performance by Gustavo Santaolalla with the Qatar Philharmonic Orchestra was shown. Qatar Reads and QM also launched "Cultural Crossroads: Qatar, Argentina, and Chile 2025", a reading programme.

=== Qatar Canada and Mexico 2026 ===
For 2026, Qatar partnered with Canada and Mexico. The first event that was part of the YOC was the Qatar International Food Festival in January, which hosted chefs from Canada and Mexico. The YOC includes a Winter Sports development programme that started in April. A photography collection of the 2022 World Cup in Qatar with the name "Under one Sky" was also launched as part of the YOC. In Mexico City, a cultural programme incorporating film, art photography and football history was launched in June. It included the "Objects of Glory: Iconic Moments in the History of Football" exhibition at the Museo Jumex, which was organised together with the 3-2-1 QOSM. At Fashion Art Toronto three Qatari and Qatari-based designers made their debut. As part of the YOC, calligraphy artworks from Fatma Al Sharshani were showcased at the MURAL Festival in Montreal, Canada.

== International cooperations ==
In September 2022 it was announced that Qatar Museums and the New York Metropolitan Museum of Art had agreed on an exchange with regards to exhibitions, activities, and scholarly cooperation. Sheikha Al-Mayassa bint Hamad bin Khalifa Al Thani, Chairperson of Qatar Museums, described the partnership as a welcome opportunity to further the common goal of increasing the appreciation for the art of the Islamic world. To celebrate the completion of the renovation works and reopening of the Doha Museum of Islamic Art as well as the 10th anniversary of the opening of the Metropolitan Museum's Galleries for the Art of the Arab Lands, Turkey, Iran, Central Asia and Later South Asia, Qatar Museums had made a substantial gift to the Metropolitan Museum, which would benefit its Department of Islamic Art and some of the museum's other principal projects. To express their appreciation the Metropolitan Museum adopted the name Qatar Gallery for the museum's Gallery of the Umayyad and Abbasid Periods.

After six years of collaboration with the Yuz Museum in Shanghai and the Los Angeles County Museum of Art, an exhibition of contemporary Qatari and Qatar-based artists entitled "Watering the Desert | Contemporary Art from Qatar" opened at the Yuz Museum in November 2023. The three museums have also previously organized exhibitions such as "In Production: Art and the Studio System" in late 2019. In December 2023 Qatar Museums signed a memorandum of understanding with the National Museum of Mongolia as well as the Capital Museum of China to prepare collaborations between the museums.

A protocol of co-operation was announced between QM and the City of Venice in 2024. The protocol outlines activities such as “the protection and regeneration of cultural heritage, including the ... implementation of structural interventions aimed at restoring some symbolic parts of the City of Venice”, seminars and exhibitions. In February 2025 it was announced, that Qatar would open a permanent National Pavilion at Venice Biennale's Giardini. Qatar is one of three countries within the last 50 years to open a pavilion at the Biennale.

The museum partnered with the ARC-WH for the February 2024 workshop "Mechanisms and Concepts of the 1972 World Heritage Convention and the 1954 Convention for the Protection of Cultural Property in the Event of Armed Conflict", which was held at the MIA. Qatar Museum also signed a MoU with Microsoft in 2021 and again in 2024. In March 2024, the museum also signed an MoU with the West Kowloon Cultural District Authority. The MoU includes plans for two exhibitions, the first at the Hong Kong Palace Museum in 2025 and the second at the MIA in 2026. In October 2024 QM announced a partnership with the UK-based Akoje Residency to support artists from the SWANA regions.

=== National cooperations ===
In response to the earthquakes in Syria and Turkey in February 2023, QM and the Qatar Red Crescent Society started the "Be Their Hope" fundraising campaign, which accepted donations of food, toys, clothing and essential items.

== Publications ==
Qatar Museums releases regularly publications on arts, archaeology, Islamic history, and oriental studies; both in English and Arabic. Examples of these books are "Qatari-British relations 1914–1949" by Yousif Ibrahim Al Abdullah (1999),"From Cordoba to Samarqand" by Dr. Sabiha Al Khemir (2006), and "Traditional Architecture in Qatar" by Mohammad Jassim Al-Khulaifi (2003).

Additional publications included, "The Ramayana of Hamida Banu Begum, Queen Mother of", "A Falcon’s Eye: Tribute to Sheikh Saoud Al Thani", "M.F. Husain: Horses of the Sun", "Notre monde brûle/ Our World is Burning", "Wael Shawky: Crusades and Other Stories". Some of the publications also won the American Institute of Graphic Arts (AIGA) "50 Books / 50 Covers" award for Design Excellence. The winner in 2020 was "Kaws: He Eats Alone" by Germano Celant, 2021 was "Christian Dior: Designer of Dreams" by Oliver Gabet and in 2022, the winner was "Taysir Batniji: Untitled (Portraits of Martyrs)".

Publications based on museums were also published such as the first prize winner in museum publications in 2019, "National Museum of Qatar (Deluxe and Trade Editions)" which also received the A’ Silver Design Award in Print and Published media in 2021.

== Education ==
Qatar Museums entered into a three-way partnership with University College London and Qatar Foundation in 2011. Qatar Museums' partnership with the University College of London began in 2010 and ended in 2020. University College London has established UCL Qatar at Education City, a center of excellence for the study of museology, conservation and archaeology. UCL provides master's degrees in these areas, as well as short specialist courses delivered for Qatar Museums staff. During its 10 years, the program had 330 graduates, with 2,500 students participating in the 230 courses offered. The program received research funding of roughly £11 million used primarily for Arab and Islamic focused projects. On 13 December 2020, the last graduation was held. The graduating class included 108 students from 29 countries, of which 73 were women.

== See also ==
- List of museums in Qatar
