= Murakami-Ego =

- Genre: Superflat Art, Pop Art
- Venue: ALRIWAQ Doha exhibition space
- Location: Doha
- Country: Qatar
- Organizer: The Qatar Museums Authority
- Website: http://ego.qma.org.qa

Murakami-Ego is the name of an exhibition by Japanese artist Takashi Murakami that took place in ALRIWAQ Doha exhibition space, Qatar, between 9 February and 24 June 2012. It is the first solo exhibition for the artist in both Qatar and the Middle East, as well as his biggest exhibition ever, showcasing over 60 works created since 1997, alongside new ones designed especially for the exhibition.

Murakami-Ego is, additionally, the third and last chapter of a trilogy of exhibitions that started off in the Museum of Contemporary Art in Los Angeles, then moved to the Château de Versailles in Paris. The exhibition was curated by Massimiliano Gioni, one of the most important contemporary Italian art critics and curators.

== Background ==
In September 2010, Murakami launched his controversial exhibition at the Château de Versailles. Sheikha Al-Mayassa Al Thani, the chairperson of the Qatar Museums Authority (which sponsored in part the Château de Versailles exhibition), visited the exhibition and decided to invite Murakami to bring his works to Qatar.

Initially, the exhibition was supposed to take place at the Doha Museum of Islamic Art, but the artist found the venue small for his works. The Qatar Museums Authority decided then to build a temporary exhibition hall for the exhibition, which would later become ALRIWAQ Doha exhibition space.

The exhibition took a few months to be installed, with Murakami using a team of 200 people to make sure he met the deadline for the opening. Yet, the main piece at the exhibition, a 100-metre-long wall painting named (temporarily) Aarhat that was specially commissioned for the show, was not finished by the time the exhibition opened for the public on February 9, 2012.

== Main themes ==
Murakami-Ego touches upon different themes, such as consumerism, interpretation, and exchange. It marries the joyful aspects of pop culture with the sadness and darkness of natural disasters (and mainly the Fukushima nuclear disaster). It provides a glimpse into the personality of the artist and his ego, while showcasing his attachment to his origins and his religion, which is Buddhism.

Of all the objects in the exhibition, two particularly represent the themes of the exhibition: the Artist's giant inflatable self-portrait and the Aarhat wall painting.

The 6-metre-high self-portrait shows the artist as a giant meditating Buddha greeting his visitors at the entrance of the exhibition space, whereas the Aarhat wall painting depicts the suffering of the Japanese people following the Fukushima disaster, as well as how Buddhism helped many of them get the much needed spiritual relief and strength to face the loss of their relatives.

When asked about the main theme of his exhibition, Takashi Murakami insisted that it is about religion and how Buddhism can bridge the cultural gaps between nations. He said: "The theme is religion and how people experience religion in different ways. Religion is important here and in Japan. I wanted to bridge the gap through the importance of religion".

== Objects ==
The exhibition included objects from Murakami's previous works alongside new ones. Objects are mostly sculptures, paintings and inflatable portraits representing the artist.

- Welcome to Murakami Ego:

It is the giant inflatable portrait of the artist, located at the entrance of the ALRIWAQ Doha exhibition space. It is the first artwork that greets visitors to the exhibition. The inflatable is six meters tall, and it depicts the artist in a seated-Buddha pose, extending his right hand in a gesture of welcome.

- Aarhat:

Aarhat is a 100-metre-long, three-metre-high wall painting created especially for the exhibition. The painting is composed of four parts and is still unfinished. One part depicts monks in a Buddhist prayer stature, another part shows monks in meditation and others flying around them. The painting was inspired by the work of a 19th-century Buddhist painter called Kano Kazunobu. A total of 200 Japanese university art students were involved in drawing the painting.
