= Jedariart =

Qatari art programme

Jedariart is a programme started by the Public Art department of the Qatar Museums to bring artworks by Qatari and Qatari-based artists to public places across Qatar.

== History ==
The programme was started in 2020 by Qatar Museums through an open call to Qatari-based artists, in an effort to visually enhance public spaces across Qatar. 18 participants were selected from the call, of which 15 were Qatari citizens, and all of them painted murals in various places like The Fire Station, on an on ramp of the Doha expressway, or the Post Office Park. In 2021, as part of the Qatar-US Years of Culture initiative, the programme brought murals to five cities within the US, depicting a range of motives from a mural merging the San Francisco and Doha skylines to a mural of a woman wearing a traditional face covering called batoola.

The second edition of the Jedariart programme started in October 2022 and featured a cooperation with five artists from the social projects All India Permit from India and Phool Patti from Pakistan. The artists created two murals outside the Al Mansoura metro station, inspired by the painted food trucks found in India and Pakistan. The programme also included a mural coloured by school-kids from three different schools, as well as several murals at a beach hotel and the Wholesale Market street petrol station painted by four Qatari-based artists.

The applications for the third Edition of the programme were made available in March 2023. To be considered for the programme, applicants had to submit a mural design.

The 2020 artwork from Mubarak Al-Malik at the Fire Station was replaced by a mural from Abdulla Alemadi in 2023.
