= 7 (sculpture) =

Sculpture by Richard Serra

Coordinates: 25°17′53.16″N 51°32′25.46″E

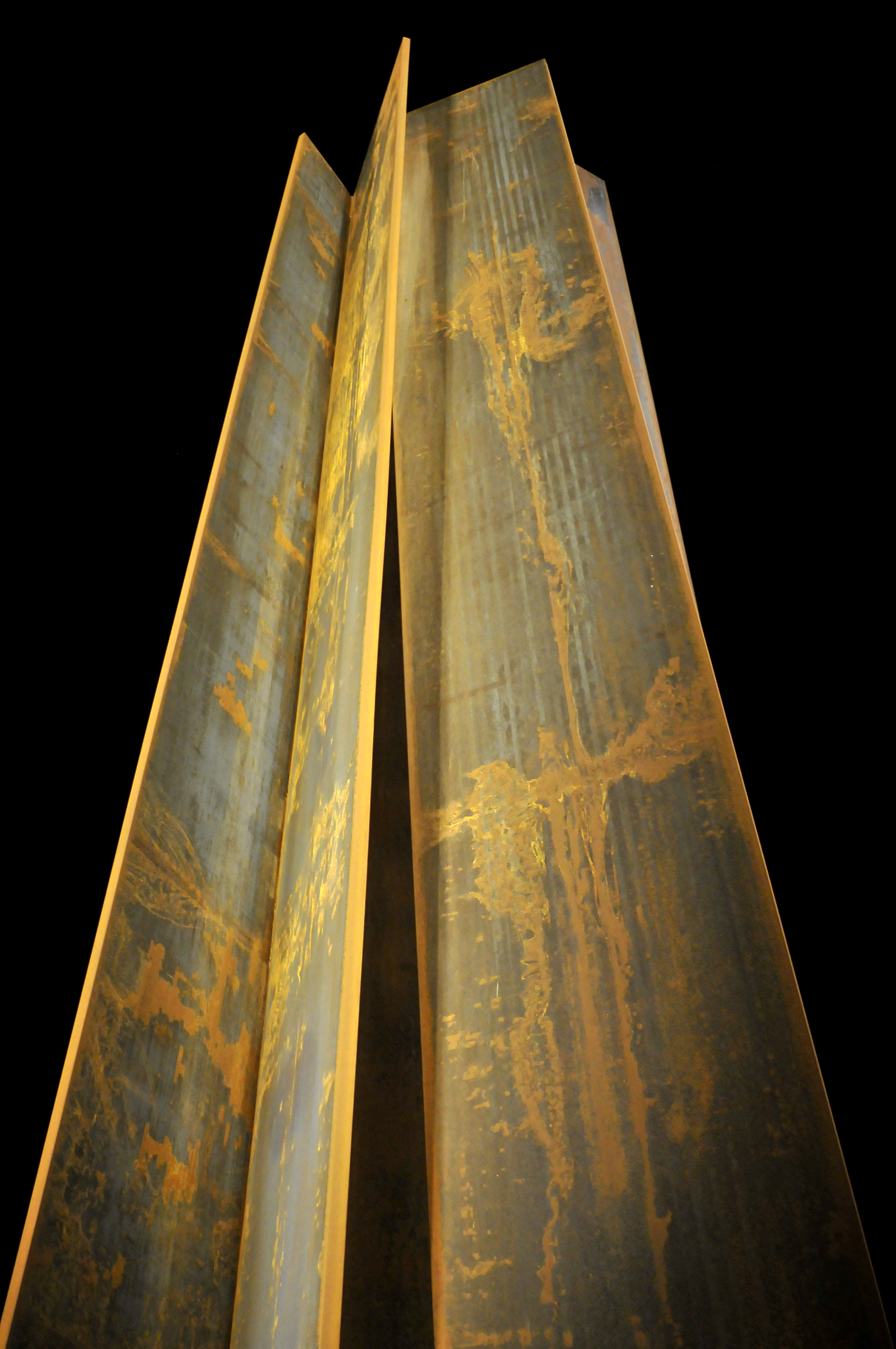

- Location within Doha
- Location: Museum of Islamic Art Park, Doha, Qatar

History
- Dedicated: December 2011

Site notes
- Height: extending 80 feet (24 metres)
- Sculptor: Richard Serra

7 is an 80-foot (24-metre) high sculpture built by American sculptor Richard Serra and located in the Museum of Islamic Art Park, in Doha, Qatar. Unveiled in December 2011, it is the tallest public art piece in Qatar and the tallest Serra has ever conceived. It is also his first sculpture to be showcased in the Middle East. Constructed from seven steel plates arranged in a heptagonal shape, the work celebrates the scientific and spiritual significance of the number seven in Islamic culture. It rests on a man-made plaza extending 250 feet (76 metres) into Doha Port.

== Background ==
Richard Serra was commissioned by the Qatar Museums Authority to create the 7 sculpture based on the personal recommendation of I.M.Pei – the architect who built the adjacent Museum of Islamic Art. According to Pei, he wanted an artist that would complement the museum and, “connect the aesthetic content of the museum to the possibility of building a public space for the people. The project took around three years between the first contact between Serra and Sheikha Al-Mayassa bint Hamad bin Khalifa Al-Thani (Chair of the Qatar Museums Authority) and the actual unveiling in December 2011, and around one year in the construction phase.

== Design ==
The original concept for the sculpture was an eight-sided, 66-foot (20-meter) tall model. This was amended later following discussions with Sheikha Al Mayassa, who was not convinced with the model. Finally, the revised plan involved seven plates of German-made Cor-ten steel assembled in a heptagonal shape and stretching 80 feet (24 meters) in the air. The design was heavily influenced by the minarets found throughout the Muslim world. A distinctive architectural feature of mosques, these tall spires date back to the seventh century. It is particularly the Ghazni minaret in Afghanistan that was the key inspiration for Serra. Richard Serra also found inspiration in the Quran's repeated use of the number seven and the fact that Persian mathematician and astronomer Abu Sahl al-Quhi was the first person to build a seven-sided heptagonal shape. These three elements would ultimately define and focus the project. Measuring ten feet wide at the base and narrowing to nine feet at the top, the tower's walls are placed so as to include three triangular openings, allowing interplay between the work and the viewer, and between the space of the outside world and the space of the work of art. The sculpture's steel slabs are made from Shanxi Black Granite and are designed to be naturally bronzed by the elements. Over an eight-year period the colour is expected to change from orange to a uniform dark shade via a process of oxidation. Each of the seven steel plates is eight feet wide (2.4 metres) and four inches thick. Visitors are able to walk inside the structure and look up at the sky above.

== Construction and location ==
Taking more than one million man-hours to construct, the sculpture stands on a small plaza 250 feet (76 metres) from the shoreline. When Serra first arrived in Doha to find a site to build a sculpture, he found a barren parkland along the city's corniche, as well as rocks, earth, and rubble from the building of the I.M. Pei-designed Museum of Islamic Art and its adjacent parkland.

From these left-over materials, Serra and the Pei team built a crescent-shaped extension onto the water. This pier took over three years to build, with the help of the Pei team and architect Hiroshi Okamoto. During its construction, the pier needed extensive engineering and underwater reinforcements, positioned by a team of deep-sea divers, for stabilization.

This is the first time that a sculptor has designed the physical location of their site-specific sculpture, as the sculpture's site was formerly only water.

According to Serra, the sculpture was designed to complement its surroundings. "It is my hope that the sculpture will provide both a public place and a private space for people to gather and experience the narrow, vertical, open column in relation to themselves, the Museum of Islamic Art, the city of Doha, the surrounding sea, and then sky as seen through the opening at the top of the sculpture."

== Unveiling ==
The unveiling of 7 was attended by Sheikh bin Khalifa Al-Thani, Sheikha Al-Mayassa bint Hamad bin Khalifa Al-Thani, other royals of the House of Thani, and more than 700 guests. At the ceremony, the Qatar Philharmonic Orchestra performed Hughes de Courson's "The Magic Lutes" and Serra spoke about its origins and his own research.

== See also ==
- Public art in Qatar
