= Sabiha Al Khemir =

Tunisian illustrator and writer

Sabiha Al Khemir or Sabiha Khemir (Arabic: صبيحة الخمير; born 1959, Korba, Tunisia) is a Tunisian writer, illustrator, and expert in Islamic art, whose work is concerned with cultural bridging and cultural dialogues. She was the founding director of the Museum of Islamic Art in Doha, Qatar. She was born in Tunisia and grew up in Korba, Tunisia, where she attended Koranic school as a child. She is fluent in and lectures internationally in English, Arabic and French in addition to speaking Italian and Spanish. Her multifaceted approach has been widely recognized. She is known for using themes relating to the metropolitan location and identity in her literature and art.

== Education ==
Al Khemir graduated in 1982 from the University of Tunis, École Normale Supérieure, with a degree in English Literature. In 1986 she received an MA (with distinction) in Islamic Art and Archaeology from London University, School of Oriental and African Studies, and in 1990, a Ph.D. from London University, School of Oriental and African Studies. In 1990 she was a Post-Doctoral Fellow, University of Pennsylvania, Philadelphia, United States.

Some of her first scholarly activities were evident in her Ph.D. dissertation, "The Palace of Sitt al-Mulk and Fatimid Imagery," London University, School of Oriental and African Studies, UK, 1990.

== Islamic culture and art career ==
Between 1991 and 1992, Al Khemir was a consultant for the Metropolitan Museum of Art, New York for the exhibition "Al-Andalus: Islamic Arts of Spain." She traveled in Europe and North Africa in search of objects and history that would provide the basis for the show. "…She wrote a close study of ten examples of Quranic manuscripts to show how different styles of calligraphy developed in the Islamic world…The year of the Al-Andalus show was significant: 1992 was the five-hundredth anniversary of Christopher Columbus's famous voyage in 1492, which was also the year when Islamic rule came to an end on the Iberian peninsula." This experience inspired one of her later essays, "The Absent Mirror," first published in "Meetings with Remarkable Muslims," Eland Books, UK, 2005.

In 1992–1993, Al Khemir produced two documentaries broadcast on Channel 4, UK. From 1993 to 1996, she was a consultant for the Nour Collection Inc., Khalili Collection of Islamic Art.

She authored a major work on figurative Islamic art ("Figures and Figurines, Sculpture from the Islamic Lands (7th–19th century)," Khalili collection Series, Oxford University Press and contributed to "Seals and Talismans," Khalili Collection Series (both forthcoming). She was the subject of a short documentary for Central Television, UK, titled "Take 15" in 1993.

Between 2001 and 2004, she worked internationally as a consultant and also as an Islamic Art Tutor and Lecturer, The British Museum Diploma in Asian Art, London, UK.

Al Khemir served as the founding director of the Museum of Islamic Art in Doha, Qatar from 2006 to 2008, having joined as a consultant from 2003 to 2004 when she provided research and documentation for the developing collection. In 2005-2006 she was named the chief curator / acting director. She has been recognized for her vision in establishing a program for the museum that emphasizes the contextual place of the art and the educational program that began well before the museum was officially opened in November 2008. She was effective in making the collection grow with the acquisition of a number of unique works of art.

She curated and wrote the catalog (in French, Arabic and English) for the Louvre Exhibition "From Córdoba to Samarkand, Masterpieces from the Museum of Islamic Art, Doha" (2006), the first museum presentation of some of the pieces that would become the core of the museum's permanent collection. Al Khemir's choices for the exhibition show "all the essential elements of Islamic art: the arabesque, geometry and calligraphy. … It is sublime, but Sabiha Al Khemir wants the objects in the collection, while giving joy, to change our perceptions of Islamic art and correct some common misapprehensions …Sabiha Al Khemir hopes that the manifest beauty of the objects will lead people to a new appreciation of Islamic art, and that this museum will interpret its history and traditions for a modern audience, just as Pei's building finds a contemporary, modernist language for historic Islamic architecture. Thus the collection and building are metaphors for one another."

In November 2012, Al Khemir was appointed as the first Senior Advisor of Islamic Art at the Dallas Museum of Art. Al Khemir was hired by the museum to enhance the presence of Islamic art in its exhibitions and collections.

In March 2014, Al Khemir's exhibition "Nur: Light in Art and Science from the Islamic World," a wide-ranging presentation of Islamic art, moved to the Dallas Museum of Art after its run in Seville at the Focus-Abengoa Foundation. The exhibition's central theme was the Arabic concept of "nur," which has a metaphysical dimension beyond a visual, physical meaning, as in the Quranic phrase "light upon light," signifying God as the light of the world. "With her deep knowledge of Islamic objects around the world, Ms. Al Khemir was able to secure several works that have never before been shown in the United States, including four pages from the 'Blue Koran' of ninth- to 10th-century Tunisia; a 19th-century, six-and-a-half-foot-long gouache of the zodiac, originally from Iran, that has never been on public view; and several 11th-century crystal chess pieces that have never before left Spain."

== Bibliography ==
=== Non-fiction ===
- "Figures and Figurines: Sculptures of the Islamic Lands" Hardcover, Oxford University Press, ISBN 0-19-727622-9
- De Cordoue a Samarcande: Chefs d'oeuvre du musée d'art Islamique de Doha. by Sabiha Khemir, Musée du Louvre, ISBN 2-35031-064-7
- "Mobile Identity and the Focal Distance of Memory," Displacement and Difference, Saffron Books, 2002.
- "Cairo the Triumphant," Institute of International Visual Arts, UK, 1999.
- "The Arts of the Book," Al-Andalus: Islamic Arts of Spain, The Metropolitan Museum of Art, New York, New York 1992.

=== Fiction ===
- The Blue Manuscript, in English, (ISBN 1844673081) Verso, New York and London, (November 17, 2008), weaves a tale about a mythical archaeological dig in Egypt for the magnificent Blue Koran. As the story moves between the 10th Century and Egypt of the 1980s and the layers of the excavation are exposed so, too, are the layers of the personalities of the team, or 'people of a different clay' as the locals called them. The Library Journal on November 15, 2008, gave the book a coveted star review saying "The author's pithy and wise observations are rooted in contemporary sociopolitical realities and make this an exceptionally complex, engrossing, and poignant story." John Leonard noted in Harper's: "The Blue Manuscript' is full of information and historical tidbits as it is of lonely owls, doomed love, rock crystal, grotesque shadows, portentous dreams, peacock eyes, goats and flutes, a love of Arabic, and a fractal theory of Islamic art-a novel as hybrid and heterogeneous, as forgiving and inspiriting, as Ryszard Kapuscinski's 'cultural hospitality'."
- 'Waiting In the Future for The Past to Come', in English (ISBN 0704370484, Hardcover, March 1, 1994, Interlink Pub Group Inc.,) is "lyric and sensual." It follows the early life of a young Tunisian girl as she makes her way in the world. She moves between East and West, is educated in England and returns to her small town for a celebration of her own success to discover she is a person of the world not just of one place or time. It is an emotional work but as Middle East International noted, "…where the book really scores, however, is evoking the small-town atmosphere and changing values of Tunisia during the last gasp of the French Protectorate…For this alone it deserves to be in the suitcase of every foreign visitor..."
- "Fables across Time: Kalila and Dimna," American Folk Art Museum (December 8, 2016), an English-language children's book written and illustrated by Al Khemir, is a collection of three animal fables centered around two jackals, adapted from a story cycle that originated in India more than two thousand years ago.

=== Art work ===
In her first published creative work as young illustrator, she contributed at age 15 to 'L'Ogresse' (Edition Maspero, Paris, 1975) and fully illustrated 'Le Nuage Amoureux' at age 18 (Edition Maspero, Paris, 1978).

Al Khemir's drawings have been used as illustrations or as designs for book covers of well-known authors such as Respected Sir by the Nobel Prize–winning author Naguib Mahfouz.

Most are executed in pen and ink where the precision and command of line and the tiny marks of pen point juxtapose the freely expressed world of the story. She has created worlds that reflect the timeless nature of various stories, often classic Islamic tales. Her style alludes to historic Islamic illustration but is totally modern. They are humorous and idiosyncratic.

Her best-known illustrative work is "The Island of Animals," Quartet, London and the University of Texas Press (April 1994). (ISBN 0292740360). Her drawings unite with Denys Johnson-Davis' translation of this 10th Century Islamic fable about man's responsibilities to animals, adapted from "Epistles of the Brethren of Purity," "The Dispute between Animals and Man."

As noted above, Al Khemir illustrated the children's book "Fables across Time: Kalila and Dimna," American Folk Art Museum (December 8, 2016), which she also wrote.

== Exhibitions ==
- 2014, "Nur: Light in Art and Science from the Islamic World," Dallas Museum of Art, United States;
- 2013, "Nur: Light in Art and Science from the Islamic World," Focus-Abengoa Foundation, Spain;
- 2012, "Beauty and Belief: Crossing Bridges with the Arts of Islamic Culture," Brigham Young University Museum of Art, United States;
- 2009, Adair Margo Gallery, El Paso, Texas, United States;
- 2006, "Word into Art," The British Museum, United Kingdom;
- 1999–2000, "Dialogues of the Present," (touring exhibition), United Kingdom;
- 1998, Zamana Gallery, London, United Kingdom;
- 1993–1995, National Museum of Women in the Arts, Washington, D.C., United States (also included tour within the United States);
- 1993, 1987–1988, Kufa Gallery, London, United Kingdom;
- 1980, Beaubourg Pompidou Centre, Paris, France.
