= Fatma Al Sharshani =

Qatari calligraphy/calligraffiti artist

- Education: Qatar University
- Style: Calligraphy; Graffiti

Fatma Al Sharshani (Arabic: فاطمة الشرشاني) is a Qatari artist and calligrapher. She has received commissions from Qatar Museums and Paris Saint Germain. One of her designs featuring Arabic writing was featured on the football kit worn by PSG in their 2025 Trophée des Champions match in Doha, the first time Arabic had featured on the club's sportswear.

== Career ==
Al Sharshani has a degree in Chemistry and Food Science from Qatar University. She began to study calligraphy in 2011, enrolling in courses at the Museum of Islamic Art in Doha. Her first mural was commissioned by Qatar Museums in 2020. Titled 'Al Noor' it has a circular design and is situated in Qatar Post Park. Al Sharashani stated that the work was inspired by the poetry of Jassim bin Mohammed Al-Thani. In 2021, as part of the Qatar-USA Year of Culture, Al Sharshani was jointly commissioned by Portland Street Art Alliance and Qatar Museums to create her third mural in Portland, USA. Entitled Never Ending / Endless, the circular mural uses the Diwani script, chosen by Al Sharshani since it is a particularly curved calligraphicstyle. She also uses Naskh and Thuluth scripts in her calligraphic work. The mural is located at Southeast Alder Street and 11th Avenue.

In 2024 Al Sharshani travelled to Morocco as part of a project by Qatar Museums to commission artists to create new work for a 2025 exhibition, entitled Ektashif: Morocco. She has twice been commissioned by the football team Paris Saint Germain (PSG) to create new artwork. The first commission - a skateboard design - was made in 2023 as a partnership between PSG and Clown Skateboards. The second commission was for a design in Arabic to feature on shirts worn at the Trophée des Champions match played on 5 January 2025. This was the first time that Arabic writing featured on PSG kit. Al Sharshani described the commission as "a wonderful opportunity to showcase our [Islamic] culture on an international stage". She chose the Diwani script for the football kit, as it is clear to read and combined well with the rest of the characteristics of the kit.
