= Diwani =

Script variety of Arabic calligraphy

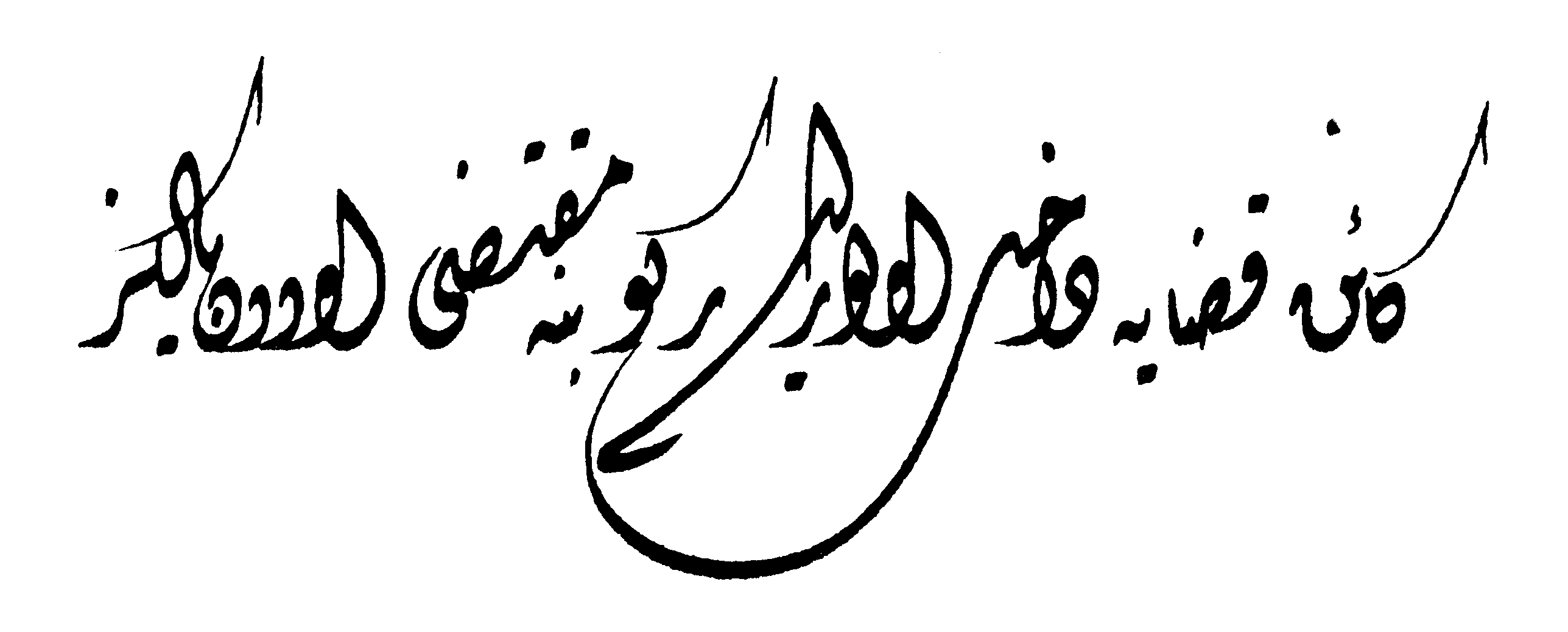
Diwani calligraphy by Kazasker Mustafa Izzet Efendi

Diwani is a calligraphic variety of Arabic script, a cursive style developed during the reign of the early Ottoman Turks (16th century - early 17th century). It reached its height of popularity under Süleyman I the Magnificent (1520–1566).

It was labeled the Diwani script because it was used in the Ottoman diwan and was one of the secrets of the sultan's palace. The rules of this script were not known to everyone, but confined to its masters and a few bright students. It was used in the writing of all royal decrees, endowments, and resolutions. A Diwani text adorned with a tughra, a complex calligraphic seal, represented the authority of the Sultan and the Ottoman state.

The Diwani script can be divided into two types:

1. The Riqʿa Diwani style, which is devoid of any decorations and whose lines are straight, except for the lower parts of the letters.
2. The Jeli Diwani or clear style. This kind of handwriting is distinguished by the intertwining of its letters and its straight lines from top to bottom. It is punctuated and decorated to appear as one piece.

Diwani writing is known for the intertwining of its letters, which makes it very difficult to read or write, and difficult to forge.

Jeli Diwani font

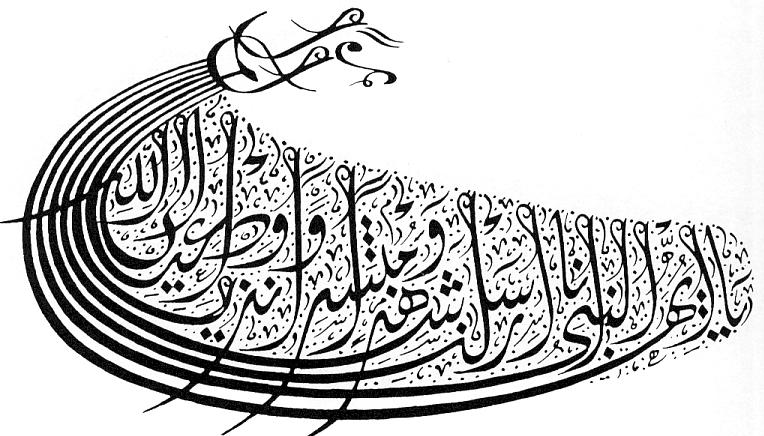

Diwani is marked by beauty and harmony, and accurate small samples are considered more beautiful than larger ones. It is still used in the correspondence of kings, princes, presidents, and in ceremonies and greeting cards, and has a high artistic value.

== Modern use ==
Mural artist and calligrapher Fatma Al Sharshani uses the script in her work, most notably in her mural Never Ending / Endless, which is located in Portland, USA.

== See also ==
- Islamic calligraphy
- Kufic
