= 3-2-1 Qatar Olympic and Sports Museum =

Sports related museum in Qatar

Coordinates: 25.26375°N 51.45017°E

3-2-1 Qatar Olympic Sports Museum

- 3-2-1 Qatar Olympic & Sports Museum
- Established: 30 March 2022
- Location: Al Rayyan, Qatar
- Type: Sports Museum
- Director: Abdulla Yousuf Al Mulla
- President: Sheikh Mohammed bin Abdulla Al Thani
- Architect: Joan Sibina
- Owner: Qatar Museums Authority
- Website: 321qosm.org.qa

The 3-2-1 Qatar Olympic and Sports Museum is the first sports-related museum in the Middle East. It focuses on the history of both domestic and international sports and officially opened to the public on 30 March 2022 with inauguration by the Qatari Emir, Tamim bin Hamad Al Thani. The museum was designed by Spanish Architect Joan Sibina, measures 19,000 square meters and is connected to the Khalifa International Stadium. The museum is partners with the International Physical Literacy Association and Accessible Qatar. It received over 100,000 visitors in its first 8 months after opening.

== Design ==
The main building was designed to represent the history and culture of Qatar. Its cylindrical shape made of glass is surrounded by five coloured rings to represent the Olympic rings. Each ring is illuminated and placed at various heights and angles. Traditional Islamic Jali-like screens fill the horizontal space between the rings and building facade.

The second part of the museum was built along the tallest side of the stadium, in a more subtle architectural style which reflects original designs from the stadiums itself. Rows of diamond-shaped panelling cover the outside of the building which is nestled between the stadium and Olympic ring building. The two museum buildings are connected through a glass enclosed walkway.

== Galleries ==
The museum is house to seven exhibition spaces, each focusing on a different theme.

=== World of Emotion ===
As the first of the galleries, this is the reception and lobby area of the museum. Here there is an overview of all of the themes of the museum as well as how sports are influencing Qatar.

=== A Global History of Sport ===
The second gallery allows visitors to travel through the history of sports from all over the world going back as far as 8th century BCE and moving up to the early 20th century.

=== Olympics ===
The third gallery is dedicated to the Olympic Games from the beginning until the present games as they are today. Various items from over the years are on display including every torch from the Summer and Winter Olympic Games beginning from 1936.

=== The Hall of Athletes ===
Gallery four is dedicated to 90 sports heroes from all over the world. Various items are on display, including a jersey worn by soccer legend Pele and a Formula One Ferrari that was driven by Michael Schumacher.

=== Qatar – Hosting National ===
This gallery is dedicated to the several major sports events Qatar has hosted in recent years, beginning with the 2006 Asian Games held in Doha.

=== Qatar Sports ===
The sixth gallery displays how sports have developed in Qatar, starting with the nations traditional games all the way to the introduction of international sports and eventually the implementation of international competitions.

=== Activation Zone ===
The seventh gallery, and seventh floor of the museum, is dedicated to promote sports across Qatar. It is an interactive area hoping to inspire future talent and encourage visitors to follow healthy active lifestyles. Visitors can make their way through 18 stations to test their skills, after which they receive a personalized profile at a kiosk.

=== 321 Esports Lounge ===
The seventh floor also includes the 321 Esports Lounge, which was opened in May 2026. The lounge includes PC stations, gaming consoles as well as a broadcast station and a viewing area.

== Programmes and partnerships ==
In 2025, the 3-2-1 QOSM and the Olympic Museum in Lausanne launched the "Olympic Heritage Artists-in-Residence programme" for digital artists, planned as an annual programme until the 2028 Olympic Games in Los Angeles. In September 2025, the museum entered a partnership with the organising committee of the 2027 Basketball World Cup in Qatar, the Qatar Basketball Federation and the FIBA Foundation covering basketball-focused exhibitions, education and documentation projects. In February 2026, the museum and the World Innovation Summit for Health signed a cooperation agreement covering research, public engagement and policy dialogue at the intersection of sport and health.

== Inauguration ceremony ==
On 30 March 2022, the museum was officially opened during an evening inauguration ceremony by Qatar Amir HH Sheikh Tamim bin Hamad Al Thani. The Qatar Philharmonic Orchestra as well as a children's choir performed for the event. Qatar Museums Chairperson HE Sheikha Al Mayassa bint Hamad Al Thani held a speech and HH the Amir also honoured the Tokyo 2020 Olympic Games high jump champions, Mutaz Essa Barshim and Gianmarco Tamberi. The ceremony was attended by numerous prominent figures, Ministers and high-ranking officials like David Beckham, HE Dr. Thomas Bach, and Gianni Infantino.

== Restaurant and cafe ==
Visitors to the museum also have the opportunity to visit the café as well as a restaurant. The 3-2-1 Café can be found on the third floor, while the Naua, which means nucleus of the seed in Arabic, is located on the eighth floor. The Chef Consult Tom Aikens designed the menu concept along with the operator of the restaurant JW Marriott. The restaurants menu was specifically designed to promote conscious and healthy eating.

== Temporary exhibits, sculptures and events ==
- "Coup de tête", a 5-meter bronze sculpture which was originally located at the Corniche in Doha, was re-installed in June 2022 at the 3-2-1 Museum. The sculpture depicts the overtime moment during the 2006 World Cup final when Zinedine Zidane, a French-Algerian soccer player, headbutted the Italian player Marco Materazzi.
- Paris-Saint-Germain set up a virtual reality exhibition at the museum only days before the opening ceremony of the World Cup in 2022. The exhibition took up an area of 55 square meters, and held various VR headsets with activities based in Paris and the Rouge & Blue.
- The "World of Football" exhibit displayed various items that were borrowed, to represent the game and its global reach and diversity. Among other things, it included a ball from the first World Cup in 1930, the first written rules of the game and a jersey worn by Diego Maradona as he made the "Hand of God" goal.
- The "Qatar Football History. Discover a Journey of 75 Years" exhibit was open from November 2022 until December that same year. Everything pertaining to the beginning of Qatar's football history, from sand pitches to the opening of the Doha Stadium was available to viewers.
- The "Qatar and the Sport of the Kings" exhibit was opened in collaboration with HH the Amir Sward Festival 2023. Displaying Qatar's equestrian history and as well as Qatar's achievements within the sport. Included in the display was the first volume of the Pure Arabian Stud Book as well as the Prix de L'Arc de Triomphe Trophy 2013.
- The 2022 Olympic Day was celebrated at an event held by the Qatar Olympic Committee at the museum. Alongside members from Team Qatar students from the Olympic programme several schools attended. Various activities were offered to visitors that were all focused on the different sections of the museum.
- "A Day at the Library" which took place in August 2022, allowed children to tour the library, see the football books gallery and get tips on doing commentary. This event was one of many of the museums educational programmes meant to increase awareness and knowledge of sports history. After the success of the children's day, a second event for adults, which included giveaways as well as a drawing workshop, was held on 23 August that same year.
- In August 2022 three events were held for adolescent volunteers: "Effective Communication", "Let's Make it Remain on Earth" showing participants how to make visual education content and "The Youth for Environment" raising awareness of international and local ecological issues through games.
- At the end of August 2022, the museum invited physical education teachers from over 120 international and government schools to participate in several workshops, in order to increase Qatar's physical literacy and strengthen the relationship it has with its schools.
- In October 2023, storytelling sessions were held each Saturday for children from 7-11 in Arabic and English.
- In April 2022 the Museum hosted an Obstacle Course in the Khalifa Stadium. At the Expo 2023 in Doha, the Museum organized the "3-2-1 Sustainable Obstacle Course Challenge".
- In May 2024 the museum hosted the "International Museum Day: The Power of Museums in Building a Sustainable Future" event.
- A installation that runs from February 2024 to August 2024 shows the film "Zidane: A 21st Century Portrait".
- From July 2024 to August 2024 the museum hosts the exhibition "Olympism: More Than a Dream" at the Le Royal Monceau Raffles Paris hotel, showcasing Qatar's history of Olympic participation since 1984, as well as highlighting the founder of the modern Olympics, Pierre de Coubertin.
- The museum organizes the exhibition "Esports: A Game Changer", together with Qatar Museums, about the history of Esports in Paris from July 2024 to September 2024. The exhibition was first held at the Résidence Cîteaux, curated by Christian Wacker, before being held at the 3-2-1 QOSM from September 2025 to March 2026.
- From November 2024 to April 2025 the museum hosts the exhibition “The Race Is On”, together with the UK’s Silverstone Museum and the future Qatar Auto Museum. The exhibition is shown at the E8 Exhibition Gallery.
- In February 2025, the museum hosted the "Game, Set, Match – Qatar Tennis Legacy" exhibition at the Khalifa International Tennis and Squash Complex. The exhibition documents the history of tennis in Qatar and was organised together with the Qatar Tennis Federation.
- As the first museum in the Middle East, 3-2-1 QOSM hosted "Sneakers Unboxed: Studio to Street", a touring exhibition organised by the Design Museum, from October 2025 to March 2026.
- As part of the 2026 Year of Culture programme, the museum partnered with Qatar Museums and Museo Jumex on "Objects of Glory: Iconic Moments in the History of Football", an exhibition at Museo Jumex in Mexico City from June to August 2026, showcasing 16 historic football objects.
- The museum collaborated on the travelling exhibition "Journeys to Greatness: Qatar 2022 Legacy", focusing on the cultural legacy of the 2022 World Cup. The exhibition was first presented at Mexico City's Centro de Cultura Digital from June to August 2026.

== See also ==
- List of museums in Qatar
