= List of museums in Qatar =

This is a list of museums in Qatar.

== Museums in Qatar ==
- National Museum of Qatar
- 3-2-1 Qatar Olympic and Sports Museum
- Fire Station, Doha
- Mathaf: Arab Museum of Modern Art
- Museum of Illusions Doha
- Museum of Islamic Art, Doha
- Msheireb Museums
- OliOli Children's Museum
- Sheikh Faisal Bin Qassim Al Thani Museum
- Weaponry Museum
- Al Thuraya Planetarium
- QM Museum Gallery Katara
- Al Riwaq Museum Gallery
- Lawh Wa Qalam

== Proposed museums ==
- Lusail Museum
- Art Mill Museum
- Dadu Children's Museum
- Qatar Auto Museum

== See also ==
- Qatar Museums
- List of museums
