= Julia Gonnella =

Islamic scholar

Julia Gonnella (born 1963 in Düsseldorf) is a German Islamic art historian, archaeologist and museum director. She is the director of the Lusail Museum in Doha. From 2017 to 2024, she served as director of the Museum of Islamic Art (MIA), Doha.

== Education ==
Gonnella attended the University of London's School of Oriental and African Studies, where she received a Bachelor of Arts in Islamic Art and Archaeology in 1986 and a Master of Arts in Social Anthropology in 1987. She received her PhD in Islamic Studies and Social Anthropology in 1994 from the Eberhard-Karls-University in Tübingen. While studying, Gonnella worked on German excavations in Raqqa, Syria, from 1984 to 1989 and the Kuwaiti excavations in Bahnasa, Egypt, in 1985.

== Career ==
=== Archeological work ===
One of Gonnella’s principal long-term research interests has been medieval Islamic fortifications, with particular emphasis on the Citadel of Aleppo. From 1996 to 2011 she was a member of the German-Syrian archaeological mission at the citadel, where she was responsible for the study of the Islamic-period fortifications and led research on the Islamic phases of the site. The results were published in monographs and scholarly articles.

=== Museum career ===
==== Early museum positions ====
Gonnella began her museum career as a student intern at the Victoria and Albert Museum in London. From 1994 to 1996, she completed a curatorial traineeship (Volontariat) at the Museum of Islamic Art, Berlin, located in the Pergamon Museum.

During this period, she worked on the research, conservation, and presentation of the so-called Aleppo Room, a seventeenth-century Syrian reception room preserved in the Berlin collections. The project resulted in an exhibition and the publication Ein christlich-orientalisches Wohnhaus des 17. Jahrhunderts aus Aleppo (Syrien). Das „Aleppo-Zimmer“ im Museum für Islamische Kunst, SMPK (Mainz, 1996), later published in Arabic as Halab fi-l-qarn as-sabiʿ ʿashar: “al-bait al-halabi” (Aleppo, 1998). She later co-edited, with Jens Kröger, Angels, Peonies, and Fabulous Creatures: The Aleppo Room in Berlin, the proceedings of an international symposium held at the Museum of Islamic Art, Staatliche Museen zu Berlin (12–14 April 2002), published in 2008.

In 2009, she was appointed Curator at the Museum of Islamic Art in Berlin, a position she held until 2017. Her work included research, documentation, and exhibition projects related to the museum’s Islamic art collections. She conducted research on the Samarra finds in the Berlin collections and co-edited, with Rania Abdellatif and Simone Struth, Hundert Jahre Grabungen in Samarra / A Hundred Years of Excavations in Samarra (Wiesbaden, 2014), the proceedings of a symposium marking a century of excavations at the site.

During her curatorship she also led an exhibition on Friedrich Sarre (1865–1945), founder of the Museum of Islamic Art in Berlin, and co-authored with Jens Kröger the accompanying publication Wie die islamische Kunst nach Berlin kam: Der Sammler und Museumsdirektor Friedrich Sarre (1865–1945). She was further involved in research on the Diez Albums, culminating in the co-edited volume Contents and Contexts: Re-Viewing the Diez Albums (2017).

==== Director of the Museum of Islamic Art, Doha (2017–2024) ====
In 2017, Gonnella was appointed Director of the Museum of Islamic Art, Doha. During her tenure the museum underwent a comprehensive institutional and curatorial redevelopment, including the complete reinstallation of the permanent galleries, the development of a revised narrative structure and new interpretative frameworks. The museum reopened in 2022 following this major overhaul.

As director, she led the development of the museum’s curatorial programme during this period, with an emphasis on research-driven exhibitions, international loans, and partnerships, and expanded public engagement initiatives. Among the exhibitions she led were Syria Matters (2018) and Baghdad: Eye’s Delight (2022), both accompanied by scholarly catalogues.

==== Director of the Lusail Museum (from 2024) ====
In February 2024, Gonnella was appointed Director of the Lusail Museum, a planned museum in Qatar built around a major collection of Orientalist art.

In this role, she leads the development of the museum’s curatorial vision and institutional framework in preparation for its opening. The museum aims to place the collection within wider historical, artistic, and cultural contexts.

== Selected publications ==
- Gonnella, Julia (1995). Islamische Heiligenverehrung im urbanen Kontext am Beispiel von Aleppo (Syrien). Berlin: Klaus Schwarz Verlag.
- Gonnella, Julia (1996). Ein christlich-orientalisches Wohnhaus des 17. Jahrhunderts aus Aleppo (Syrien): Das Aleppo-Zimmer im Museum für Islamische Kunst. Mainz: von Zabern.
- Gonnella, Julia; Khayyata, Wahid; Kohlmeyer, Kay (2005). Die Zitadelle von Aleppo und der Tempel des Wettergottes: Neue Forschungen und Entdeckungen. Münster: Rhema.
- Gonnella, Julia (2006). “The Citadel of Aleppo.” In: Kennedy, Hugh (ed.), Muslim Military Architecture in Greater Syria. Leiden: Brill.
- Gonnella, Julia; Kröger, Jens (2008). Angels, Peonies, and Fabulous Creatures: The Aleppo Room in Berlin. Berlin: Museum für Islamische Kunst.
- Gonnella, Julia (2009). The Citadel of Aleppo: Description, History, Site Plan, and Visitor Tour. Geneva: Aga Khan Trust for Culture.
- Gonnella, Julia (2011). “Columns and Hieroglyphs: Magic Spolia in Medieval Islamic Architecture of Northern Syria.” Muqarnas.
- Gonnella, Julia (2012). “Inside Out: The Mamluk Throne Hall in Aleppo.” In: Behrens-Abouseif, Doris (ed.), The Arts of the Mamluks in Egypt and Syria: Evolution and Impact. Bonn: V&R Unipress.
- Gonnella, Julia; Rauch, Christoph (2011). Heroische Zeiten: Tausend Jahre persisches Buch der Könige. Munich/Berlin: Edition Minerva.
- Gonnella, Julia; Abdellatif, Rania; Struth, Simone (eds.) (2014). Hundert Jahre Grabungen in Samarra / A Hundred Years of Excavations in Samarra. Wiesbaden: Reichert.
- Gonnella, Julia; Kröger, Jens (2015). Wie die islamische Kunst nach Berlin kam: Der Sammler und Museumsdirektor Friedrich Sarre (1865–1945). Berlin: Reimer.
- Gonnella, Julia; Rauch, Christoph; Weis, Friederike (eds.) (2017). Contents and Contexts: Reviewing the Diez Albums. Leiden: Brill.
- Abdellatif, Rania; Gonnella, Julia; Kohlmeyer, Kay (2018). Syria Matters. Milan: Silvana.
- Gonnella, Julia; Chekhab-Abudaya, Mounia; Desjardins, Tara; Fazio, Nicoletta; Struth, Simone (eds.) (2022). Museum of Islamic Art: The Collection. London: Thames & Hudson.
- Gonnella, Julia; Chekhab-Abudaya, Mounia; Desjardins, Tara; Fazio, Nicoletta; Struth, Simone (eds.) (2022). Museum of Islamic Art: The Guide. London: Thames & Hudson.
- Gonnella, Julia; Chekhab-Abudaya, Mounia; Desjardins, Tara; Fazio, Nicoletta; Struth, Simone (eds.) (2022). Baghdad: Eye’s Delight. Milan: Silvana Editoriale.
