= Choi Byung-hoon =

South Korean artist (born 1952)

Choi Byung Hoon (최병훈) (born 1952 in Kangwondo, South Korea) is a South Korean artist. He is considered by many to be the father of Contemporary Korean Design. Choi graduated from the Hong-ik University with a degree in applied fine arts in 1974, a few years later he completed his masters of fine arts from Hong-ik. Since his graduation, Choi has become well known for his work in modernizing the traditions of Korean design. Choi gathers inspiration from Mayan, Incan, African and Indian cultures. He had been a professor of College of Fine Arts at Hongik University (Seoul, Korea) from 1990 to 2017 and is currently Honorary Professor at Hongik University.

== Work ==
SOLO EXHIBITION

- 2014 Friedman Benda, New York, NY
- 2012 Yidogallery, Seoul, Korea
- 2011 Johyun Gallery, Busan, Korea
- 2010 Galerie DOWNTOWN, Paris, France
- 2008 Gallery HANGIL, Paju, Korea
- 2008 Galerie DOWNTOWN, Paris, France
- 2007 Seoul Living Design Fair 2007 Coex, Seoul, Korea
- 2006 Galerie DOWNTOWN, Paris, France
- 2002 Johyun Gallery, Busan, Korea
- 2001 Galerie DOWNTOWN, Paris, France
- 2000 Johyun Gallery, Busan, Korea
- 1999 Ellen Kim Murphy Gallery, Seoul, Korea
- 1997 Galerie DOWNTOWN, Paris, France
- 1996 Galerie DOWNTOWN, Paris, France
- 1996 Gallery 釜山, Busan, Korea
- 1994 SunGallery, Seoul Art Fair, Seoul, Korea
- 1993 SunGallery, Seoul, Korea

SELECTED GROUP EXHIBITION

- 2015 Korea now! Design, Craft, Fashion and Graphic Design in Korea exhibition, Musée des Arts décoratifs, Paris, France
- 2015 Living In Art II, Connect, Seomi International, Los Angeles, CA, USA
- 2015 Living In Art I, Let's Art, Seomi International, Los Angeles, CA, USA
- 2014 National Museum of Modern and Contemporary Art, Seoul, South Korea
- 2014 Vanities: Art of the Dressing Table, The Metropolitan Museum of Art, New York, NY
- 2013 The Page Gallery, Seoul, South Korea
- 2013 Gwangju Design Biennale, Gwangju, South Korea
- 2012 Design Miami Basel, Basel, Switzerland
- 2012 Hand of Dreaming, Gallery Wooduk, Seoul, South Korea
- 2012 Design Days Dubai, Dubai, United Arab Emirates
- 2012 Flow, Hongik Museum of Art, Seoul, South Korea
- 2011 Curator Project, Hongik Museum of Art, South Korea
- 2011 TABLE+booktopia, Heyri, South Korea
- 2011 KIAF, Seoul, South Korea
- 2011 Design Miami Basel, Basel, Switzerland
- 2011 Chung-A Art Center Grand Opening, Chung-A Art Center, Seoul, South Korea
- 2011 Pavillon des Arts et du Design, Grand Palais, Paris, France
- 2010 Design Miami, Miami, Florida
- 2010 Seoul Design Fair, Seoul, South Korea
- 2010 ART GWANGJU, Gwangju, South Korea
- 2010 Design Miami Basel, Basel, Switzerland
- 2010 Contemporary Korean Design, R20th Century Gallery, New York, NY
- 2010 Moments in Between, Museum of Vancouver, Canada
- 2009 Design Miami, Florida
- 2009 FIAC, Paris, France
- 2009 Design Art London, London, UK
- 2009 The Seoul Art Exhibition, Seoul Museum of Art, Seoul, South Korea
- 2009 OUTDOOR FURNITURE, Lio Gallery, Heyri Art Valley, South Korea
- 2009 GaNa Art Center, Seoul, South Korea
- 2009 Le Salon du Collectionneur, Grand Palais, Paris, France
- 2009 DESIGN High, Gallery Seomi, Seoul, South Korea
- 2009 Design Miami, Basel, Switzerland
- 2009 Pavillon des Arts et du Design, Grand Palais, Paris, France
- 2009 TEFAF Maastricht, The Netherlands
- '"FAIRS'"

FAIRS

- 2015 Design Miami/ Basel Switzerland
- 2014 FOG, San Francisco, CA, USA
- 2014 Collective, New York City, NY, USA
- 2014 The Salon, New York City, NY, USA
- 2012 Design Miami Miami, FL
- 2012 PAD, Pavilion of Art & Design, London
- 2012 Design Miami/ Basel, Basel, Switzerland
- 2012 Design Days Dubai, Dubai
- 2011 Design Miam, Miami, FL
- 2011 Design Miami/ Basel, Basel, Switzerland
- 2010 Design Miami, Miami, FL
- 2010 Design Miami/ Basel, Switzerland
- 2009 Design Miami/ Basel Switzerland
- 2009 Design Miami, Miami, FL

SELECTED PUBLIC COLLECTIONS

- Busan Museum of Art, Busan, South Korea
- Chung Wa Dae, Office of the President, Republic of Korea
- Daegu University Museum, Daegu, South Korea
- Hongik University Museum, Seoul, South Korea
- Korean Crafts Council, Seoul, South Korea
- Korean Culture and Art Foundation, Seoul, South Korea
- Leeum, Samsung Museum of Art, Seoul, South Korea
- The Metropolitan Museum of Art, New York, NY
- Musee des Arts Decoratifs, Paris, France
- National Museum of Modern and Contemporary Art, Seoul, South Korea
- Seoul art Center-Design Museum, Seoul, South Korea
- Seoul Metropolitan Museum of Art, Seoul, South Korea
- Sun Jae Museum, Kyungju, Korea
- Total Museum, Seoul, South Korea
- UN Secretariat International Organization, Geneva, Switzerland
- Vitra Design Museum, Weil am Rhein, Germany
