= Museum of Islamic Art, Doha =

Museum in Doha, Ad-Dawhah, Qatar

Museum of Islamic Art
- متحف الفن الإسلامي

- Interactive fullscreen map
- Established: 22 November 2008
- Location: Doha, Qatar
- Coordinates: 25°17′42″N 51°32′21″E
- Type: Art Museum
- Director: Shaika Nasser Al-Nassr
- Architect: I. M. Pei
- Owner: Qatar Museums Authority
- Website: mia.org.qa/en

The Museum of Islamic Art (MIA; Arabic: متحف الفن الإسلامي) is a museum at one end of the seven-kilometer-long (4.3 mi) Corniche in Doha, Qatar. As per architect I. M. Pei's specifications, the museum is built on an island on an artificial projecting peninsula near the traditional dhow harbor. A purpose-built park surrounds the building on the eastern and southern facades, while two bridges connect the southern front facade of the property with the main peninsula that contains the park. The western and northern facades are bordered by the harbor, showcasing the Qatari seafaring past. In September 2017, Qatar Museums appointed Julia Gonnella as director of MIA. In 2024, Julia Gonnella became director of the Lusail Museum and was replaced by Shaika Nasser Al-Nassr. In November 2022, the MIA became the first carbon-neutral certified museum in the Middle East. The museum participated in the Expo 2023 Doha from October 2023 to March 2024, with workshops and events focusing on biodiversity and sustainability.

== Facilities ==
The museum hosts the restaurant IDAM led by the head chef Alain Ducasse. The restaurant is inspired by French Mediterranean cuisine. IDAM also offers master classes in cooking artisanal bread and raw foods. The museum has a park, workshops for schools and the general public, and a library that provides information about Islamic Arts in both English and Arabic. The library also has nine study rooms.

Adjacent to the museum is the MIA Park, a waterfront open space administered by the museum. It features cafes, a children's play area, and 7, a vertical steel sculpture by American sculptor Richard Serra. In April 2025, Qatar Museums unveiled a sculpture by Nairy Baghramian in MIA Park as part of its Public Art Collection. In 2012, a monthly bazaar was held at the park which became a bi-weekly event since late 2016. After being paused in 2022 due to the COVID-19 pandemic, the bazaar was held again in late February 2023.

== Corporations and collaborations ==
=== Islamic Arts Biennale ===
The museum lent four items to the Diriyah Biennale Foundation to be displayed at the first Islamic Art Biennale "Awwal Bait" in 2023. The second Biennale of Islamic Art in 2025, "And all that is in between", featured eight works by MIA with a focus on numbers.

== Educational programs ==
The Museum of Islamic Arts has several educational programs. The deputy director of the learning and outreach department is Salem Al Aswad.

In May 2024 the museum launched the Challenge Camp, which teaches Islamic and local values, with a second camp being held in December of the same year. The camp is a collaboration between the MIA, the AWQAFM, the Qatar Foundation, the Qatar Red Crescent, the Qatar Calendar House, and Qatar's Internal Security Forces.

=== Workshops and seminars ===
Calligrapher Fatma Al Sharshani credits the workshops she attended there as enabling her artistic career.

== Architecture ==
The design of the building contains elements of traditional Islamic architecture in combination with modernist geometric patterns. The museum features over 14 centuries of Islamic art in the Arab States of the Persian Gulf.

Occupying an area of 45,000 m^{2} (480,000 sq ft), the museum is on an artificial peninsula overlooking the south end of Doha Bay. Construction of the building was done by a Turkish company, Baytur Construction, in 2006. The interior gallery spaces were designed by a team of Wilmotte Associates. The museum was opened on November 22, 2008, by the then-emir of Qatar, Sheikh Hamad. It opened to the general public on December 8, 2008.

At 91 years of age, the museum's architect, I. M. Pei had to be coaxed out of retirement to undertake this enterprise. He traveled throughout the Muslim world on a six-month quest to learn about Muslim architecture and history and read Muslim texts to draw inspiration for his design. According to Pei, the light fountain in 9th century Ibn Tulun Mosque of Cairo was the inspiration.

Ceiling with Islamic patterns in the central atrium of the building

Declining all proposed sites for the museum, he suggested a stand-alone island for the structure to avoid encroachments by other buildings in the future. It was built off an artificial peninsula, approximately 60 m (200 ft) off the Doha Corniche and surrounded by a somewhat crescent-shaped 290,000 m^{2} (3,100,000 sq ft) park. Pei requested that the museum spaces be designed by his collaborator on the Louvre project, Wilmotte & Associates, who then assembled a design team including Plowden & Smith (conservation consultants), Isometrix Lighting + Design (lighting consultants), and SG Conseil (AV Consultants) under Turner Projacs. Along with this design team, Leslie E. Robertson Associates was the structural engineer for the project.

The main building consists of the five floors, the main dome, and the central tower. It is connected with the education ward via a large central court. Pei utilized creamy limestone for the outer facades to emphasize the various shades during the different times of the day. The five floors are covered by a glass facade to the north, and it provides a panoramic view of the Persian Gulf. The interior of the building is decorated by several Islamic arts, and the large metallic chandelier hung over the main staircase of the lobby. Many elements found in Ibn Tulun Mosque are represented in the building as an abstract form. This enables the agreement with values and principles of the postmodern architecture historical trend which synchronize the modernity and the historical Islamic architectural identity.

=== 2022 renovation ===
As preparation for the 2022 FIFA World Cup, the Museum of Islamic Art announced in June 2021 that it would be closed for renovation works until autumn 2022, to upgrade its main entrance, galleries, lecture hall and further indoor spaces. In June 2022 MIA Director Julia Gonnella introduced the museum's revised concept of an 'immersive cultural experience' to attract additional visitors and to enable families and young visitors to explore Islamic art. In August 2022 the official reopening date was confirmed for 5 October 2022 with an increased number of more than 1,100 mostly newly acquired exhibits on display. The renovations provided better accessibility and an improved educational environment including digital presentations and subjects interesting to younger visitors. The museum also added a 3-D tour to its website.

The museum reopened on 4 October 2022, during the National Cultural Event of "Qatar Creative", which provides an opportunity to bring together Qatar's creative industries with the wider public community. Its 18 newly renovated galleries, covering an area of 480,000 square feet, display Islamic art from the seventh to the 20th centuries, divided according to their historical eras and their cultural and geographical backgrounds, which allows visitors of modern Doha an extended insight into Islamic history. The renovated museum's first exhibition, Baghdad: Eye's Delight presents the traditions and history of Iraq's capital. The exhibition includes also objects loaned from the Metropolitan Museum of Art in New York and the Louvre in Paris. As part of the renovations, new permanent galleries were added, including one for China and Southeast Asia, and a 19th-century Damascus room was incorporated into the permanent exhibitions.

== Collection ==
The Museum of Islamic Art represents Islamic art from three continents over 1,400 years.

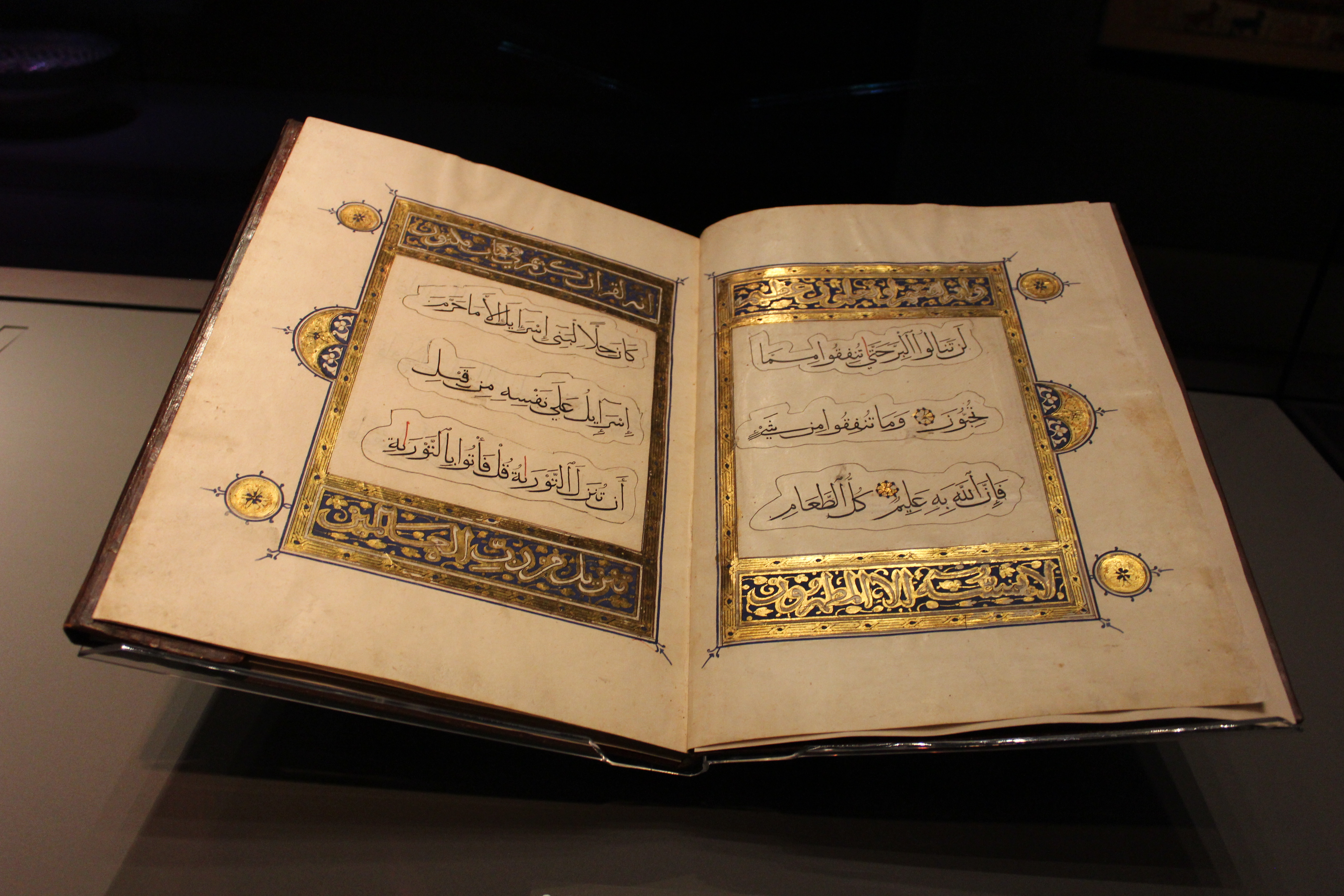
Manuscript at the Museum of Islamic Art

Its collection includes metalwork, ceramics, jewelry, woodwork, textiles, and glass, obtained from three continents and dating from the 7th to the 20th centuries. In 2026, six museum-grade replicas of MIA artifacts were produced using 3D printing, digital modelling and traditional casting.

Manuscripts and illustrations of the Shahnameh in the Museum of Islamic Art

The museum houses a collection of work gathered since the late 1980s including manuscripts, textiles and ceramics. It is one of the world's most complete collections of Islamic artifacts, with items originating in Spain, Egypt, Iran, Iraq, Turkey, India and Central Asia.

=== Manuscripts ===
An important Quranic manuscript within the collection is MS.474.2003. The museum also owns a page of the Blue Qur'an, an indigo-dyed manuscript created over 1,000 years ago that is one of the most elaborate Qur'ans in the world.

== Cooperations and collaborations ==
The MIA hosted the 2019 Love Ball Arabia from the Naked Heart Foundation as part of the 2019 Qatar-Russia Year of Culture. The 2022 to 2023 exhibition "Baghdad: Eye’s Delight" showcased objects from other museums such as the Met or the Louvre. After receiving a donation from Qatar Museums to celebrate the reopening of the MIA and the 10th anniversary of the opening of The Met's Galleries for the Art of the Arab Lands, Turkey, Iran, Central Asia and Later South Asia in 2022, the Met named one of its galleries the Qatar Gallery. During the 2021 Qatar-USA year of culture, the exhibition "Fashioning an Empire: Textiles from Safavid Iran" was shown as part of a collaboration at the National Museum of Asian Art in Washington DC. From October 2023 to April 2024 the exhibition took place at the MIA. After Qatar Museums signed a Memorandum of Understanding with the West Kowloon Cultural District Authority, an exhibition at the Hong Kong Palace Museum, organised by the MIA, were announced for 2025. In May 2024 the museum opened a Museum Escape Room in a cooperation with the VCUarts Qatar, focusing on themes such as Islamic Science, Calligraphy and Inventions as well as Astronomy.

The museum exhibited some of their items in the Place Vendôme Mall in Lusail in 2024. In June 2025 an exhibition of objects from the MIA was opened at the Hong Kong Palace Museum, showcasing cultural exchanges between Chinese and Islamic civilisations. In November 2025, MIA and the National Museum of Korea (NMK) opened the travelling exhibition Islamic Art: A Journey of Splendour at the NMK in Seoul, showcasing works from MIA's collection until October 2026.

== Exhibitions ==
The first exhibition at the MIA was Beyond Boundaries: Islamic Art Across Cultures, which showcased items loaned from 20 institutions from 15 countries to explore cross cultural exchanges and ran until February 2009. It was divided into three themes, Islam and the Transmission of Design, Islam and the Transmission of Knowledge, as well as Islam and World Religion.

Exhibitions organized by MIA include:

- Ferozkoh: Tradition and Continuity in Afghan Art, curated by Leslee Michelsen, March 2013 to July 2013.
- Steel and Gold – Historic Swords from the MIA collection, curated by William Greenwood, May 2013 to December 2013.
- Hajj: The Journey through Art, curated by Mounia Chekhab-Abudaya, October 2013 to January 2014.
- Radiant, January 2014 to March 2014.
- Kings & Pawns: Board Games from India to Spain, curated by William Greenwood, March 2014 to June 2014.
- Ceramics of al-Andalus, curated by Mounia Chekhab-Abudaya, April 2014 to August 2014.
- The Tiger's Dream: Tipu Sultan, September 2014 to February 2015.
- Mughal and Safavid Albums, September 2014 to February 2015.
- Marvellous Creatures: Animal Fables in Islamic Art, March 2015 to July 2015.
- The Hunt: Princely Pursuits in Islamic Lands, September 2015 to January 2016.
- Qajar Women: Images of Women in the 19th century Iran, April 2015 to June 2016.
- Muhammad Ali: Tribute to a Legend, July 2016 to February 2017.
- Treasures of China, September 2016 to January 2017.
- Imperial Threads: Motifs and artisans from Turkey, Iran and India, March 2017 to January 2018.
- Powder and Damask: Islamic Arms and Armour from the Collection of Fadel Al-Mansoori, August 2017 to May 2018.
- Syria Matters, November 2018 to April 2019.
- Set in Stone: Gems and Jewels from Royal Indian Courts, October 2019 to January 2020.
- A Falcon's Eye - Tribute to Sheikh Saoud Al Thani, August 2020 to April 2021.
- Beautiful Memories of Palestine, June 2021 to December 2021.
- Safar, October 2022 to January 2023.
- Raku Kichizaemon XV·Jikinyū: A Living Tradition of Japanese Pottery, November 2022 to March 2023.
- Yayoi Kusama: My Soul Blooms Forever, November 2022 to March 2023.
- City of Mirage: Baghdad, from Wright to Venturi, 1952–1982, October 2022 to February 2023.
- Mosques in Qatar: Then and Now, Museum of Islamic Art, June 2023 to August 2023.
- The Mosque: Place & Time, Museum of Islamic Art Library, June 2023 to September 2023.
- Ektashif Al Andalus (Discover Andalusia), October 2023 to December 2023
- Palestine: A Journey Through Time, January 2024
- Golden Spider Silk, March 2024 to July 2024
- In the Footsteps of Ara Güler: Exploring the Photographer's Legacy, curated by the Ara Güler Museum and Sheikha Maryam Al Thani, August 2024 to November 2024
- Crafting Design Futures, curated by Gwen Farrelly, November 2024 to January 2025
- Ektashif: Morocco, November 2024 to February 2025
- Splendors of the Atlas: A Voyage Through Morocco's Heritage, curated by Mounia Chekhab-Abudaya, December 2024 to March 2025
- A Seat at the Table: Food & Feasting in the Islamic World, May to November 2025
- I. M. Pei and the Making of the Museum of Islamic Art: From Square to Octagon and Octagon to Circle, October 2025 to February 2026.
- Empire of Light: Visions and Voices of Afghanistan, February to May 2026.
- Uzbekistan: Heritage in Motion, September 2026 to November 2026.
- Ektashif Uzbekistan Exhibition, September 2026 to November 2026.

== Gallery ==
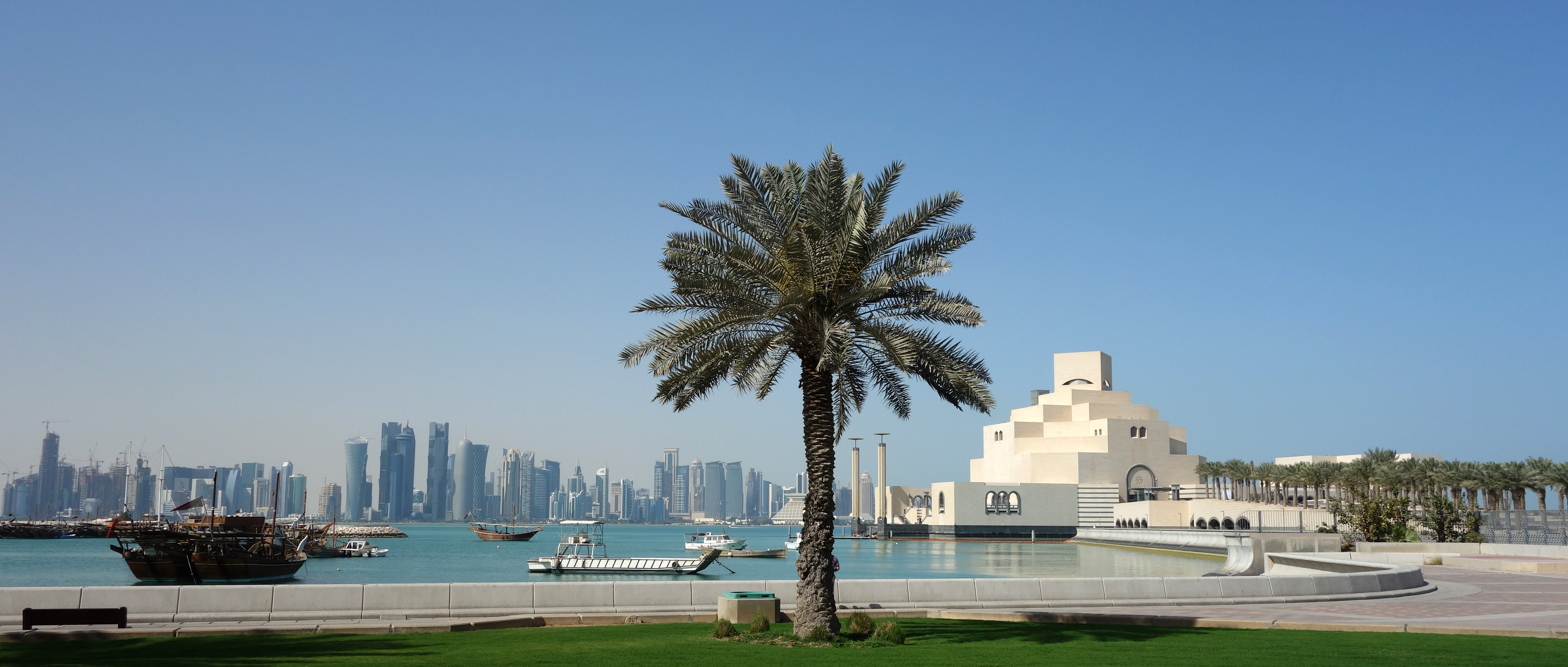
Museum of Islamic Art

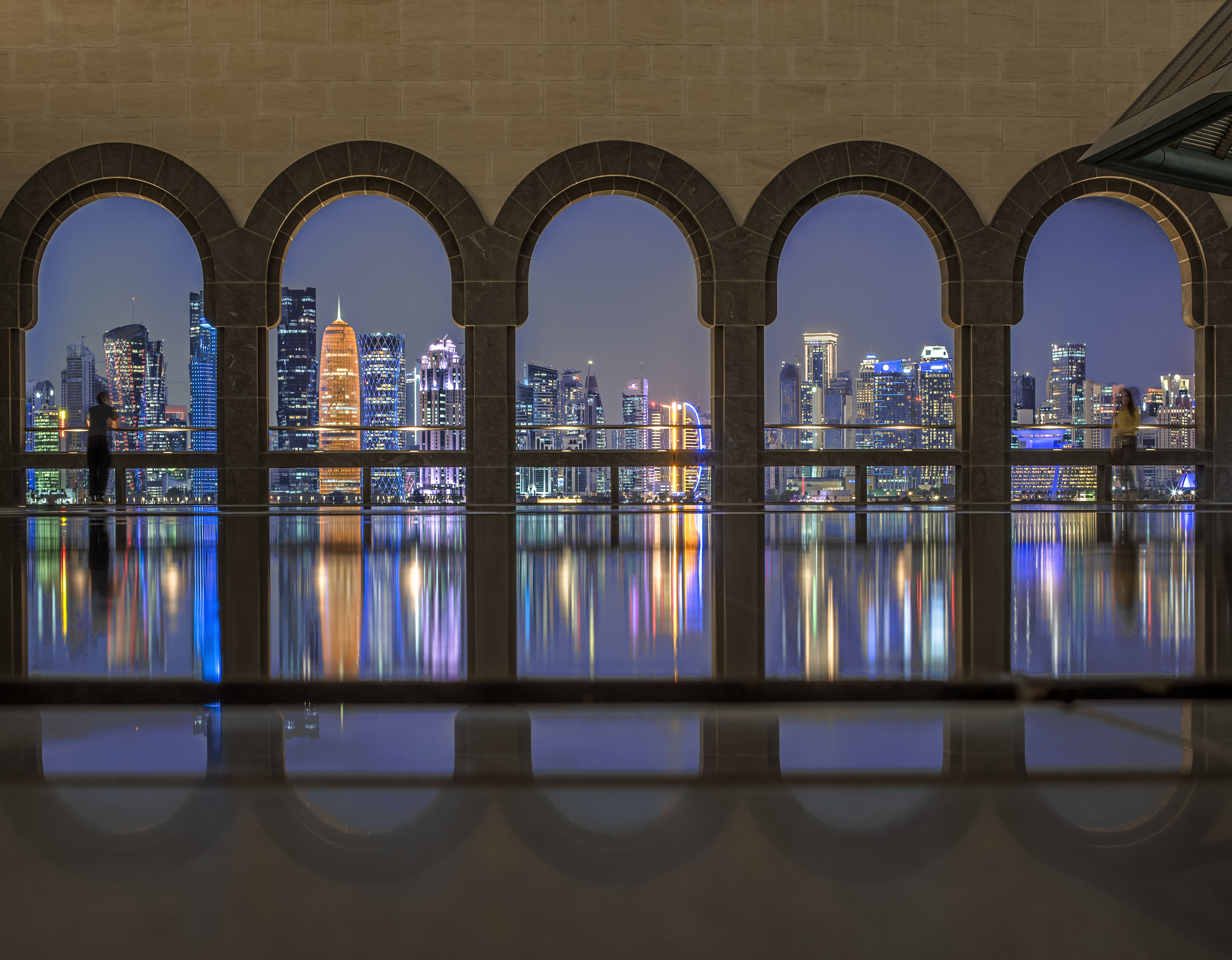
The use of arches and water features central to Islamic design

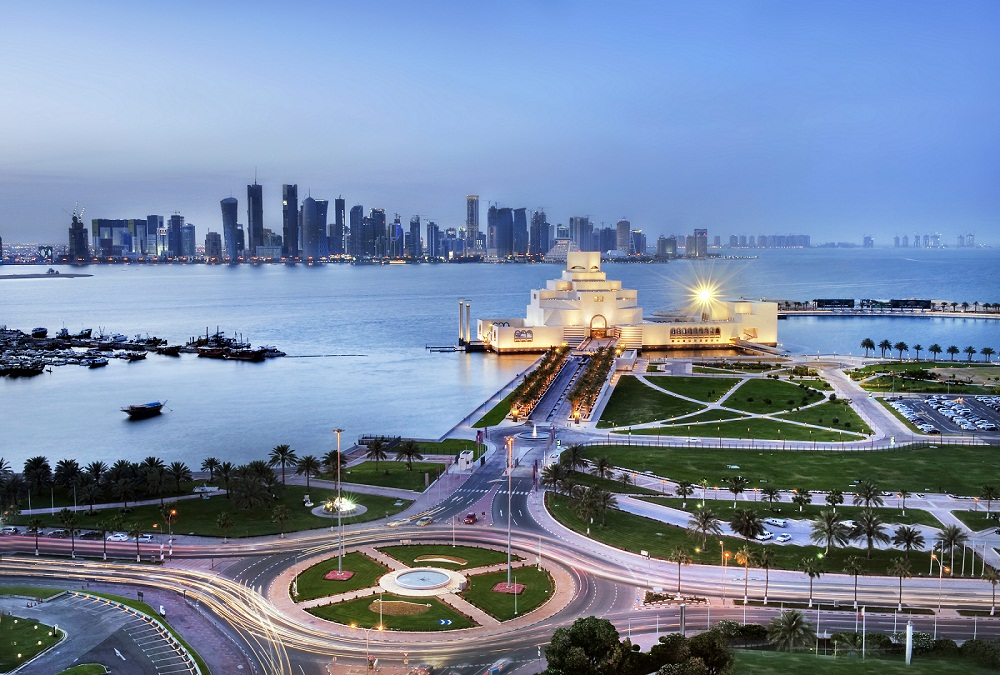
The museum with the city skyline in the background

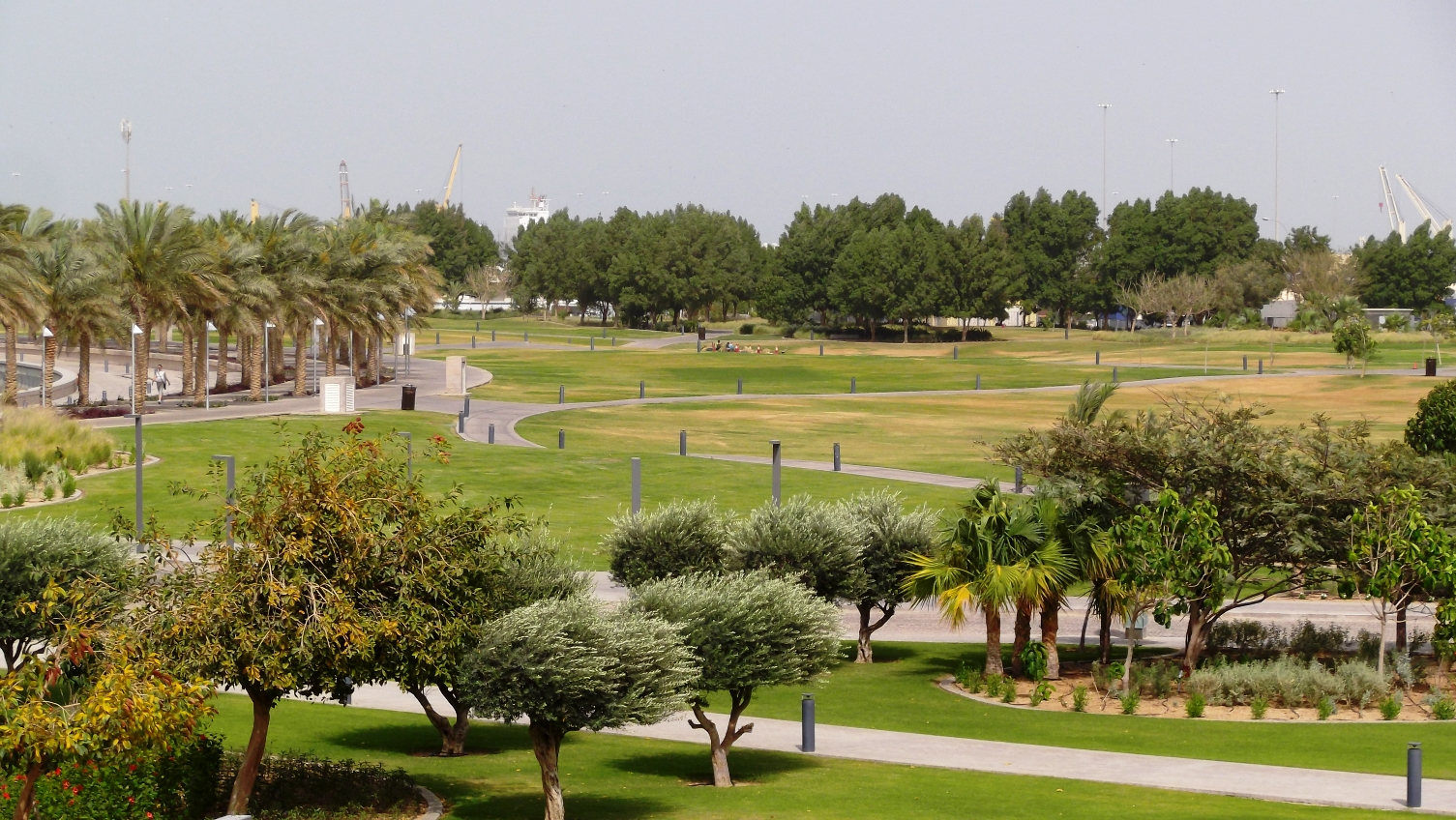
Panoramic view of trees in the MIA park

Punctures and sculptural light fixtures detail out geometric patterns and designs

The main staircase in the background and the famed light sculpture in the foreground above

The central atrium with the three transparent floored bridges to go across

Overhead view of museum cafe

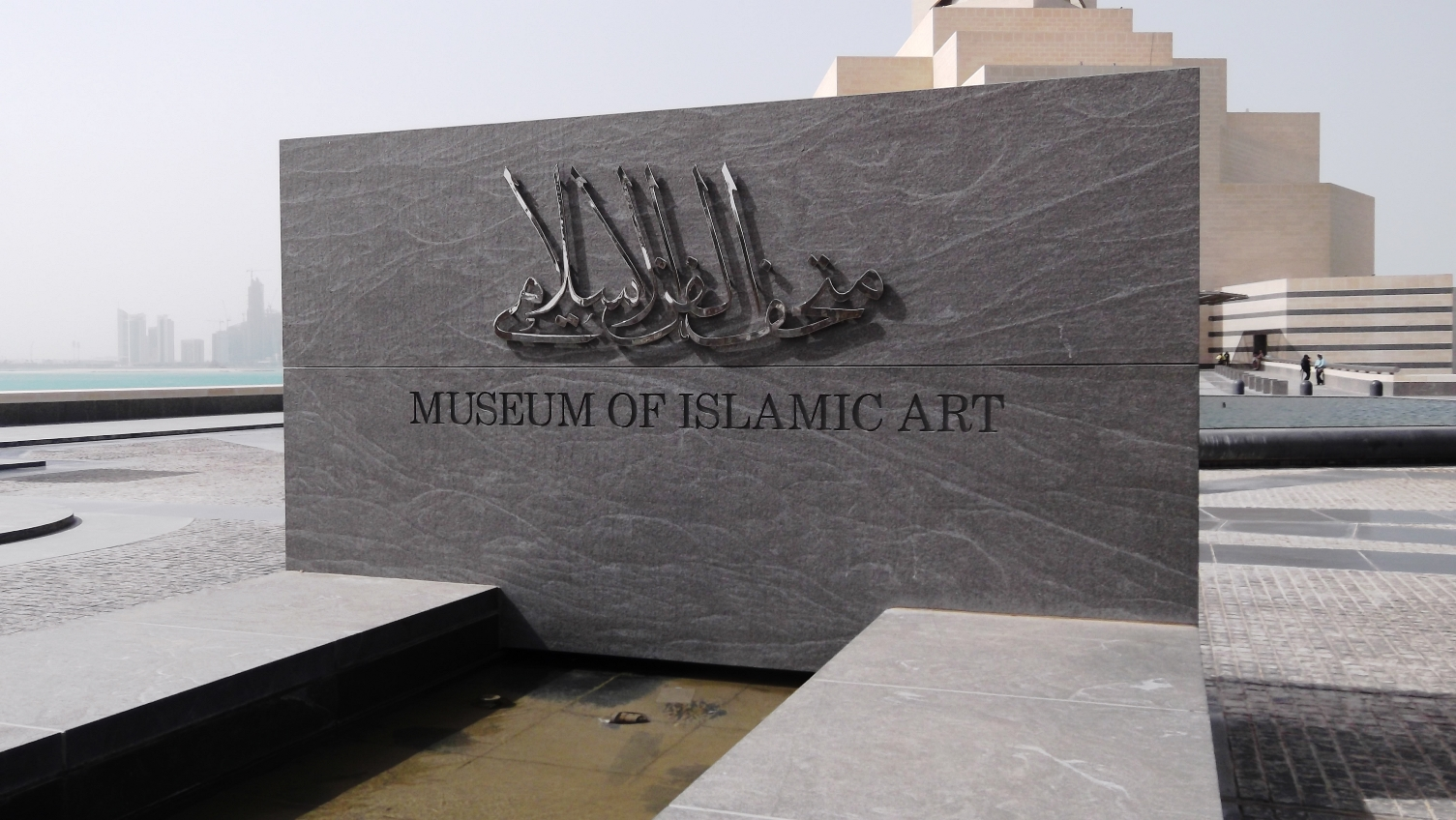
Stone writing Museum of Islamic Art

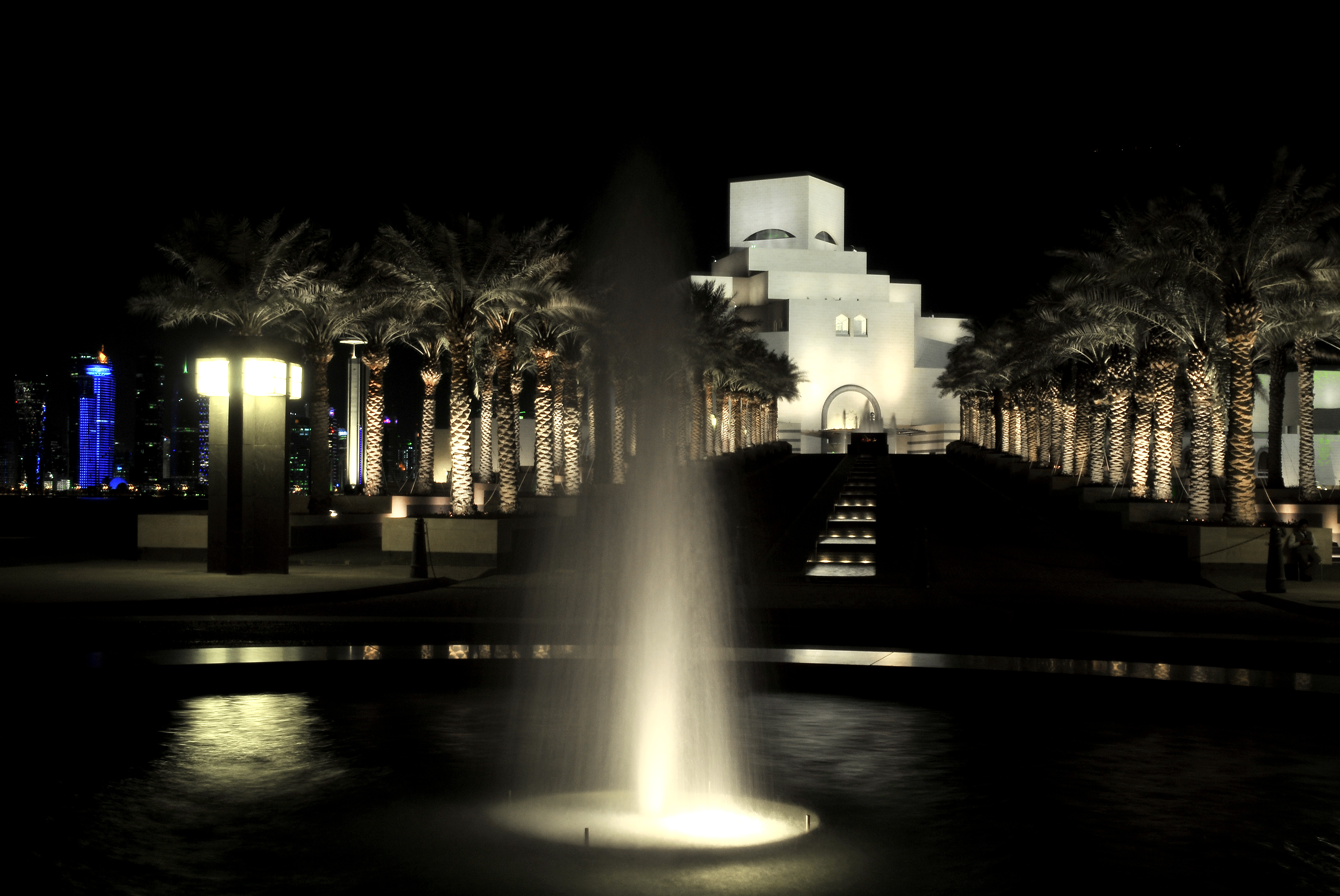
Museum in the Night

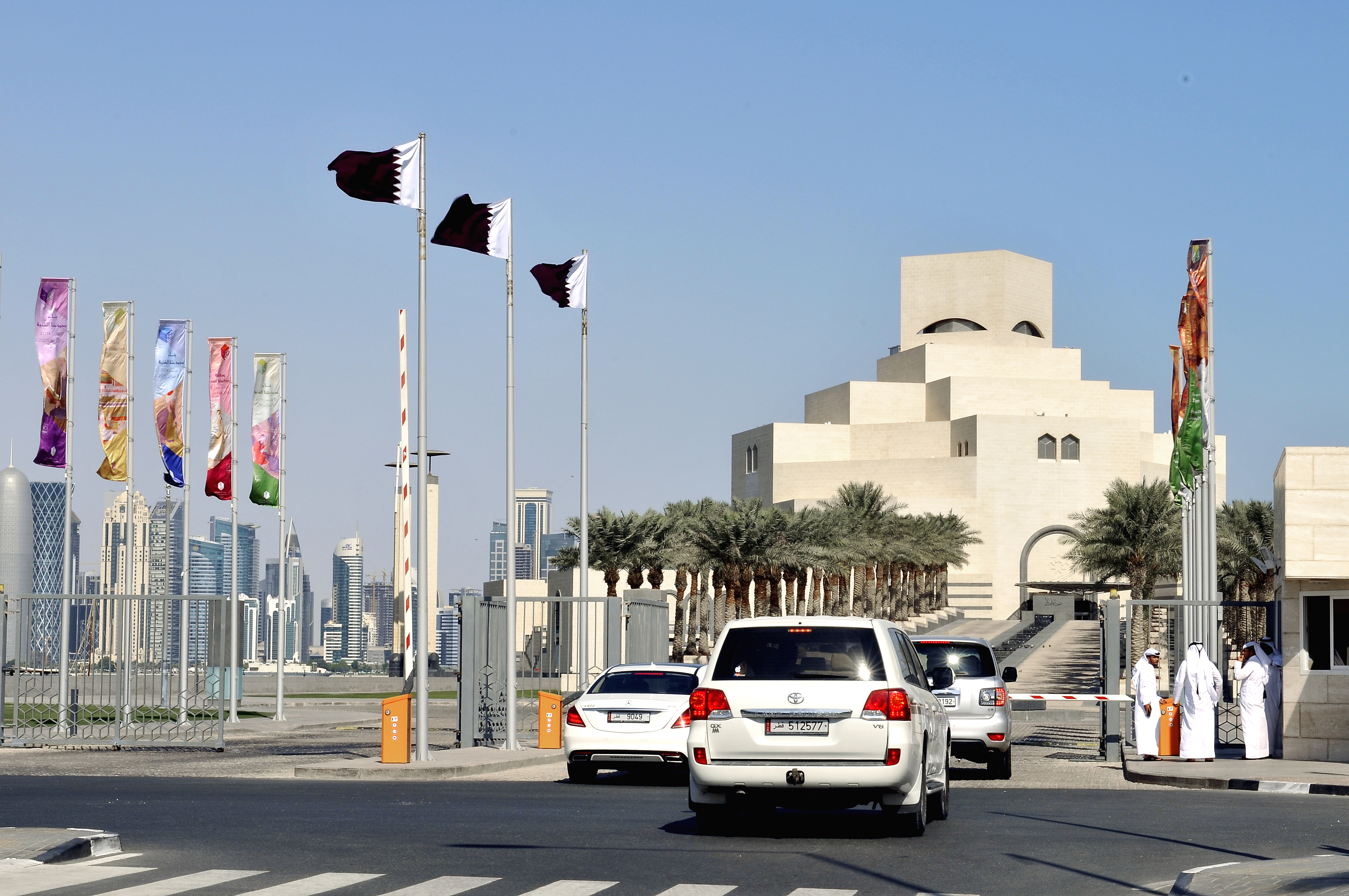
Museum Entrance

Vertical Panorama of Foyer and Main Staircase

Foyer of Museum

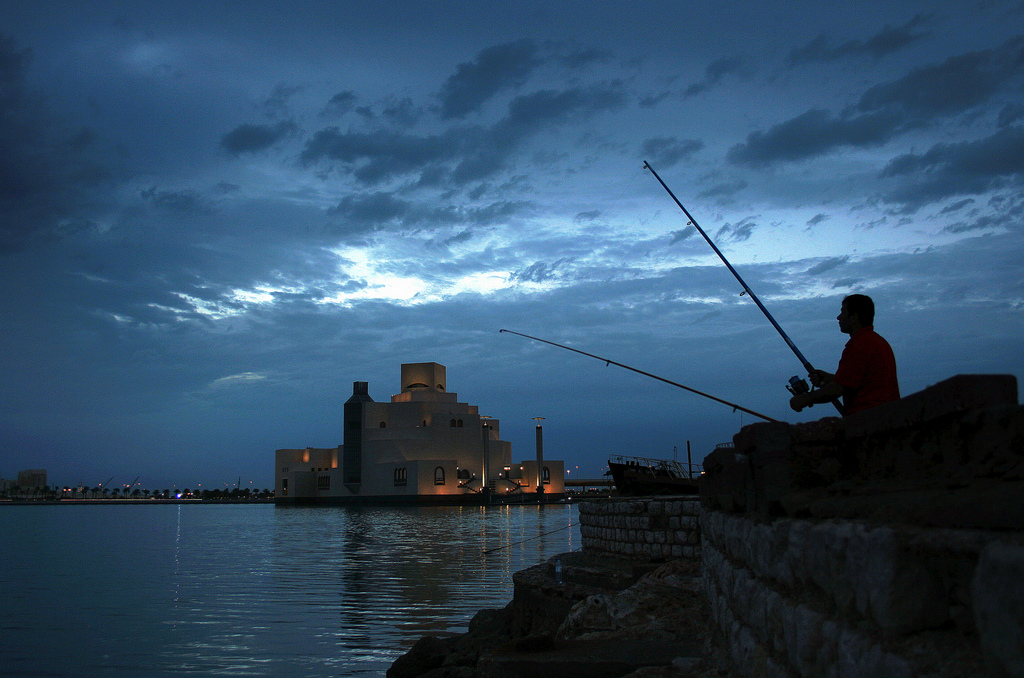
Fisherman on the Doha Corniche next to the Islamic Museum

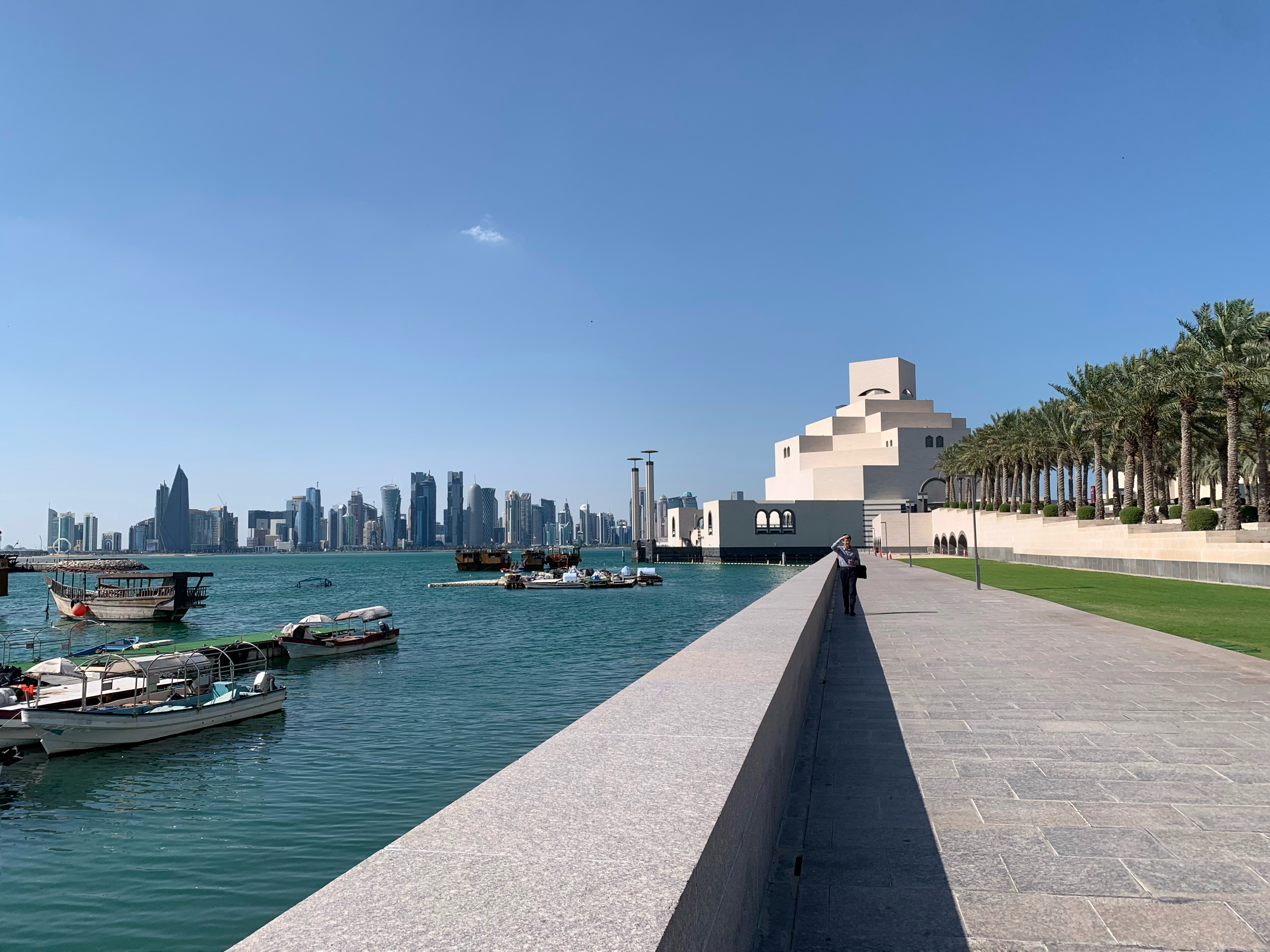
Museum of Islamic Art with Doha skyline at left

== See also ==
- List of Islamic art museums
- List of museums in Qatar
