= Qatari art =

The modern Qatari art movement emerged in the mid-20th century, as a result of the new-found wealth acquired from oil exports and the subsequent modernization of Qatari society. Due to Islam's non-inclusive stance of depictions of sentient beings in visual arts, traditional figurative art was not a feature of Qatari art, which focused on other visual art forms and crafts such as weaving, calligraphy, dhow ornamentation, and architecture.

Qatar's artistic identity began expanding in the mid-20th century with the introduction of formal visual arts education and the emergence of a local community of painters and sculptors. Since the early 2000s, state institutions such as Qatar Museums have played a primary role in the arts, commissioning public artworks, and hosting international exhibitions. Doha's museums, galleries, and festivals have positioned it as a regional center for art.

== Historical overview ==
Historically, figurative art was not a feature of Qatari society due to restrictions placed by Islamic traditions, and as a result, illustrative art forms such as paintings and drawings were rare. Instead, other visual art forms such as architecture, calligraphy and textiles were more highly valued. However, during the oil boom in the 1950s and 1960s, figurative art began to gain popularity, with common themes focusing on Islamic and Arabic heritage.

== 1950s–1980s: Emergence of modern art movement ==
The Ministry of Education played a significant role in promoting art education in the 1950s by integrating it into the school curriculum and providing facilities for art workshops. In this vein, the ministry developed plans and programs to improve art teaching methods. Additionally, it organized both local and national art exhibitions and provided educational resources such as films showcasing famous artists' works and various artistic techniques. Art education textbooks focusing on art appreciation, art history, and teaching methods were also introduced to teacher training institutes. The first nation-wide student art exhibition was held in 1961.

The Al Jasrah neighborhood, near Souq Waqif, was Qatar's cultural hub in the 1950s and onward. It was home to families closely linked to the rulers and prominent tribes, and it became a meeting place for several artists, including: Jassim Zaini (1943–2012), who is often regarded as the founder of the modern art movement, Yousef Ahmad, Hassan Al Mulla, Ali Hassan, Salman Al-Malik, and Mohammed Al-Jaida, among others. Collaboratively, they would eventually establish the first art groups in Qatar in the 1970s and 1980s.

In the 1950s, the first social and cultural clubs, such as the Al-Oruba Club and the Al-Nasr Club, emerged. However, it wasn't until the Al Jasrah Social and Cultural Club was established in 1971 that such clubs began to contribute significantly to the art scene.

=== Early development initiatives ===
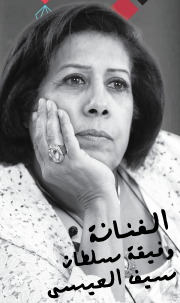
Wafika Sultan Al-Essa, the first professional Qatari woman artist

As an initiative to develop the local artist base, the Ministry of Education began offering scholarships to study art abroad. Jassim Zaini became the first Qatari art student to study abroad on a scholarship in 1962 after he enrolled in the University of Baghdad. Further artists were sent abroad on art scholarships during the 1960s and 1970s, including Wafika Sultan, Hassan Al Mulla and Yousef Ahmad. The latter became the first artist to receive an M.A. in 1981. Wafika Sultan emerged as the first professional female visual artist after graduating in 1974.

Initially, few Qatari artists had formal fine arts education, with many pursuing art through various academic routes. This changed with the establishment of Qatar University in 1973 and the eventual introduction of the Art Education Department in 1986, which produced generations of graduates. Early beneficiaries of Qatar University's arts program include artists Wafa Al-Hamad, Badriya Al-Kubaisi, and Khawla Al-Mannai.

The 'Free Studio' training program became an introductory gateway for university students, conceptualized by the Ministry of Education in the late 1960s and operational by the early 1980s under the Ministry of Information. Prominent Egyptian artist Gamal Kotb played a key role in developing training programs for the studio. The studio offered courses and public lectures, with state support providing salaries for participants and inviting prominent artists for training sessions.

=== Institutional growth and first exhibitions ===
Art exhibitions were held under the auspices of the Ministry of Education until 1972. The limited art exhibitions at the time were held in venues like the Gulf Hotel, the National Museum of Qatar, the Qatar Fine Arts Society, and clubs like Al Jasra and Al Gharrafa, with no private galleries existing at the time. Notable early exhibitions include the UNESCO Art Exhibition showcasing European painters from 1900 to 1925, the Leonardo da Vinci Manuscripts Exhibition in 1972, and the Watercolor Exhibition in 1976. Yousef Ahmad was the first artist to hold a solo exhibition in 1977. The Department of Culture and Arts inaugurated the country's first art gallery, located in the Visual Arts Center, in 1977 under its director Nasser Al-Othman.

Several art institutions and cultural clubs began to form in the 1970s; the most prominent among these was the Al Jasrah Cultural Club, which was formed in 1971. As the art movement in Qatar began to mature, the Al Jasrah Cultural Club took on the responsibility of uniting talented artists. Jassim Zaini was a member of the club's administrative committee in addition to his role as an art education supervisor at the Ministry of Education. Through his position and involvement in Al Jasrah Club, Zaini gathered many emerging talents, providing them with guidance in aspects such as color, line, and space. Among his students were several who went on to become prominent artists in the industry, including Yousef Ahmad, Salman Al Malik and Hassan Al Mulla. The club was officialized in 1974 at a ceremony held in Al Jasrah Hall.

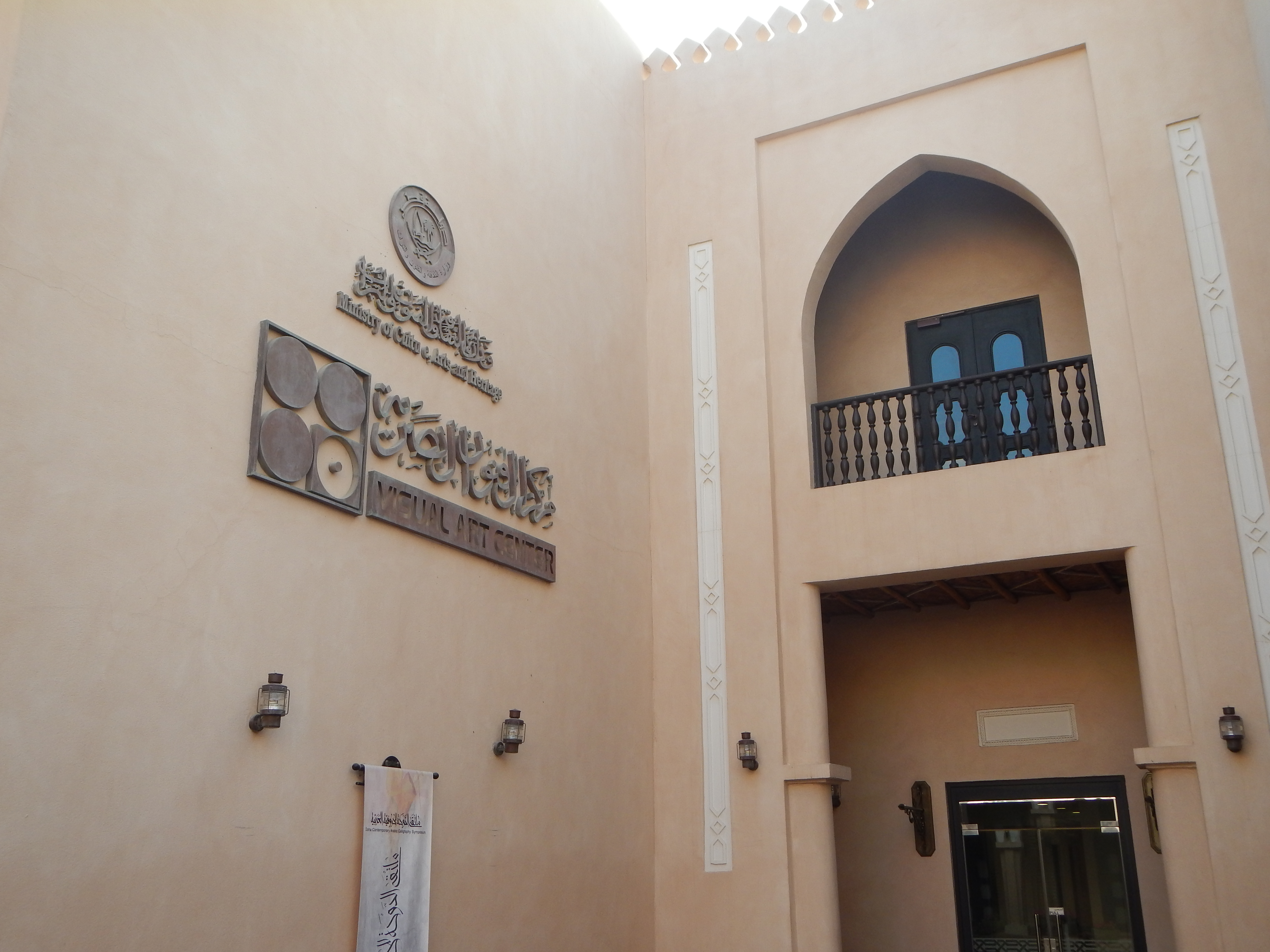
The modern-day building of the Visual Arts Center, founded in 1977, located in Katara Cultural Village

Following the founding of Al Jasrah Club, several other art institutions were established. In 1976, Mohammed Al-Mannai opened the Cultural Center. This was followed by Qatari government's establishment of the Department of Culture and Arts, which was later renamed the National Council for Culture, Arts, and Heritage, also in 1976. Finally, in 1977, the newly established Department of Culture and Arts, under its first director Nasser Al-Othman, opened the Visual Arts Center to the public to showcase the work of both Qatari and regional artists.

In 1977, Yousef Ahmad, Hassan Al Mulla, and Muhammad Ali founded the country's first art group, "The Three Friends Group". After chartering a bus, they traveled across Qatar, holding small-scale exhibitions where they displayed their works. The Qatar Fine Arts Society was established in 1980 to promote the works of Qatari artists and held its first exhibition in 1981.

=== Advancement of women artists ===
Development initiatives exclusive to Qatari women artists began in 1980 with the official opening of The Free Studio, an arts education center under the Ministry of Information. With the aim of encouraging artistic talent through courses and public lectures, the center operated on a schedule that allocated two days for female students and three days for male students for two hours daily throughout the year. The first women's session took place on 6 June 1980 and was supervised by Bahraini artist Najah Al-Madani, who played a significant role in educating many women artists. Many fundamental skills were taught to both men and women, including drawing with pencil and pastels, oil painting, Arabic calligraphy, and ceramics.

The state's support for The Free Studio included providing generous stipends for enrolled students, ensuring competent teachers, and facilitating student participation in exhibitions organized by the Department of Culture and Arts. Esteemed international artists were also invited to conduct training courses for the studio participants. Between 1981 and 1985, the studio produced several female artists, including Wafa Al-Hamad, Maryam Abdullah and Jamila Al-Shuraim. Many of these students, including Hessa Al-Muraikhi, who later became the supervisor of the women's section, continued their artistic practice after their training at the studio.

In 1981, an art workshop was opened for women with the aim of providing them with an opportunity to hone their artistic skills. In December 1982, the country's first art exhibition for women was held.

== 1980s–present: Institutional art collections and initiatives ==
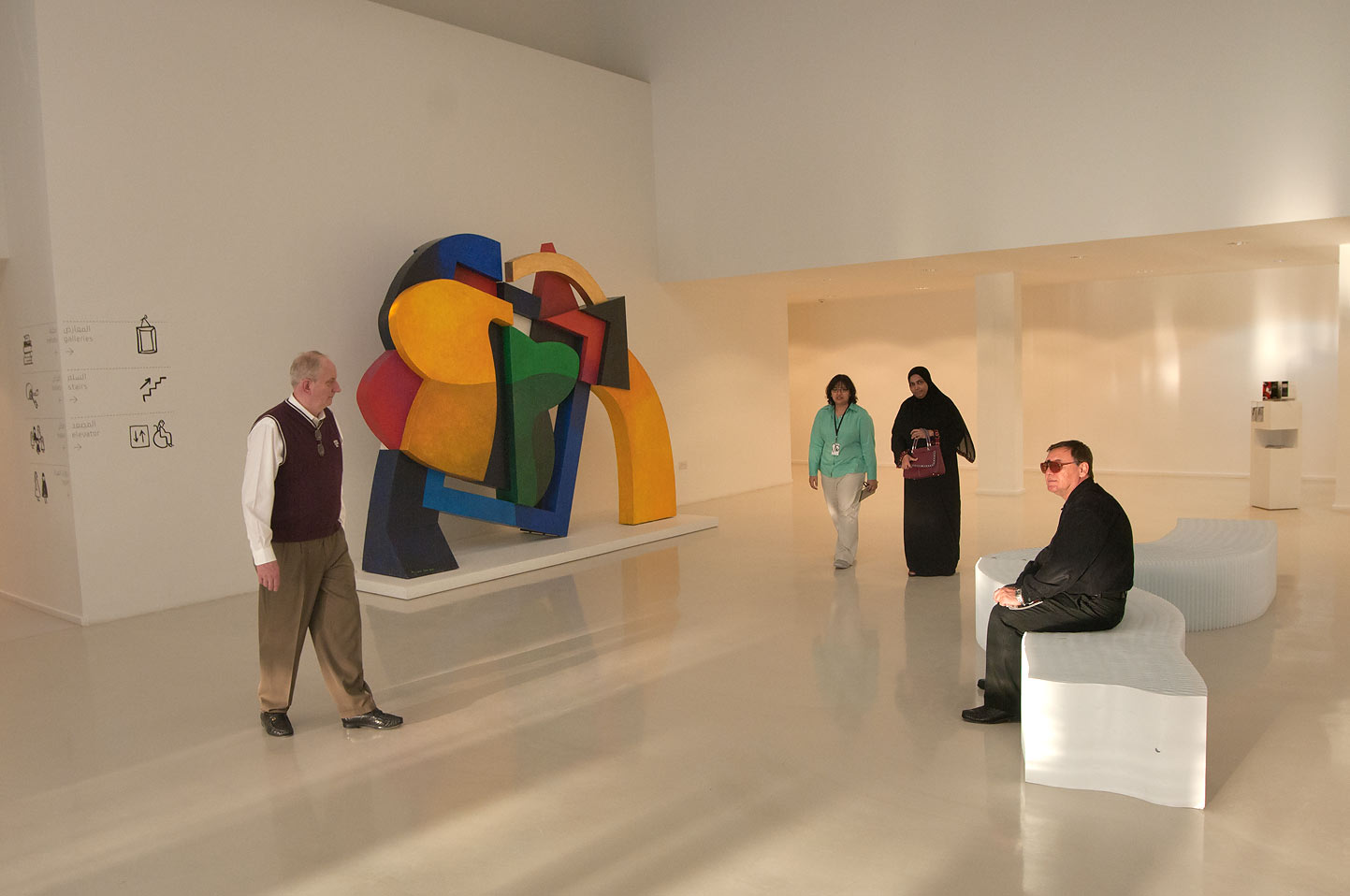
Mathaf: Arab Museum of Modern Art, established from the collection of Hassan bin Mohamed Al Thani

Five main art movements emerged in the country by the late 20th century: surrealism, realism, expressionism, abstract art, and calligraphy.

In 1986, Qatar University established its Art Education Department. In the beginning, the program did not have many participants, but it gradually became a more popular field of study over time. The initial 1986 class only had two women students. This increased to eight in 1987 and eventually exceeded 20 female students a few years later. The curriculum included both theoretical courses (covering education, art history, and criticism) and practical courses focused on various art forms (drawing, painting, ceramics, design).

A member of the ruling family, Hassan bin Mohamed bin Ali Al Thani, has been an instrumental figure in developing Qatar's modern art industry since the 1980s. Among his art-related activities was establishing his own museum which doubled as a residency space for Doha-based artists in 1994, and establishing the Mathaf: Arab Museum of Modern Art in 2010 to which he donated his entire art collection, which he had begun assembling in 1986.

In 1998, Department of Culture and Arts was integrated into the newly established National Council for Culture, Arts and Heritage.

=== 2000s ===
The early 2000s saw a significant increase in female artistic talent in Qatar. Many women artists, such as Nadia Al-Mudihki, Amal Al-Atham, and Hanadi Darwish, assumed leadership roles in art centers. Hanadi Darwish, for example, is a plastic artist who became the chairwoman of the Girls Creativity Center, which is under the supervision Ministry of Youth. These centers provided women artists with opportunities for artistic development through various training centers and international courses.

=== 2010s ===
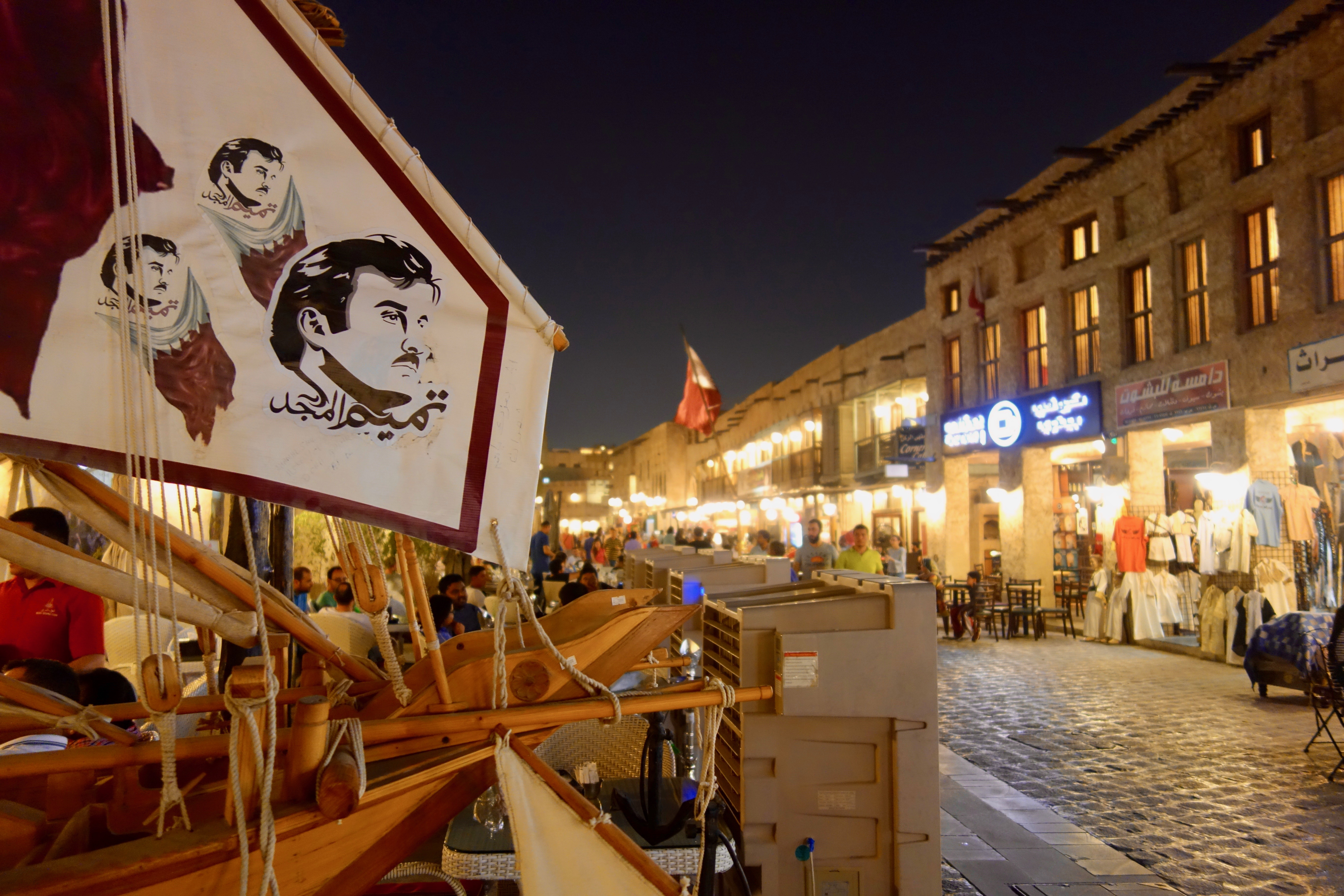
Tamim Almajd displayed in Souq Waqif

When a quartet comprising Saudi Arabia, the UAE, Bahrain, and Egypt severed all ties with and imposed a blockade of Qatar on 5 June 2017, Qatari artist Ahmed Al-Maadheed created an illustration known as Tamim Almajd (2017), which translates to "Tamim the Glorious". A simple black and white sketch of Emir Tamim bin Hamad Al Thani, beneath which is the text "Tamim Almajd" in the style of Arabic calligraphy, the illustration has become symbolic of Qatari nationalism. During the diplomatic spat, the image was displayed prominently on buildings, in media and art in Qatar.

== Art museums and venues ==
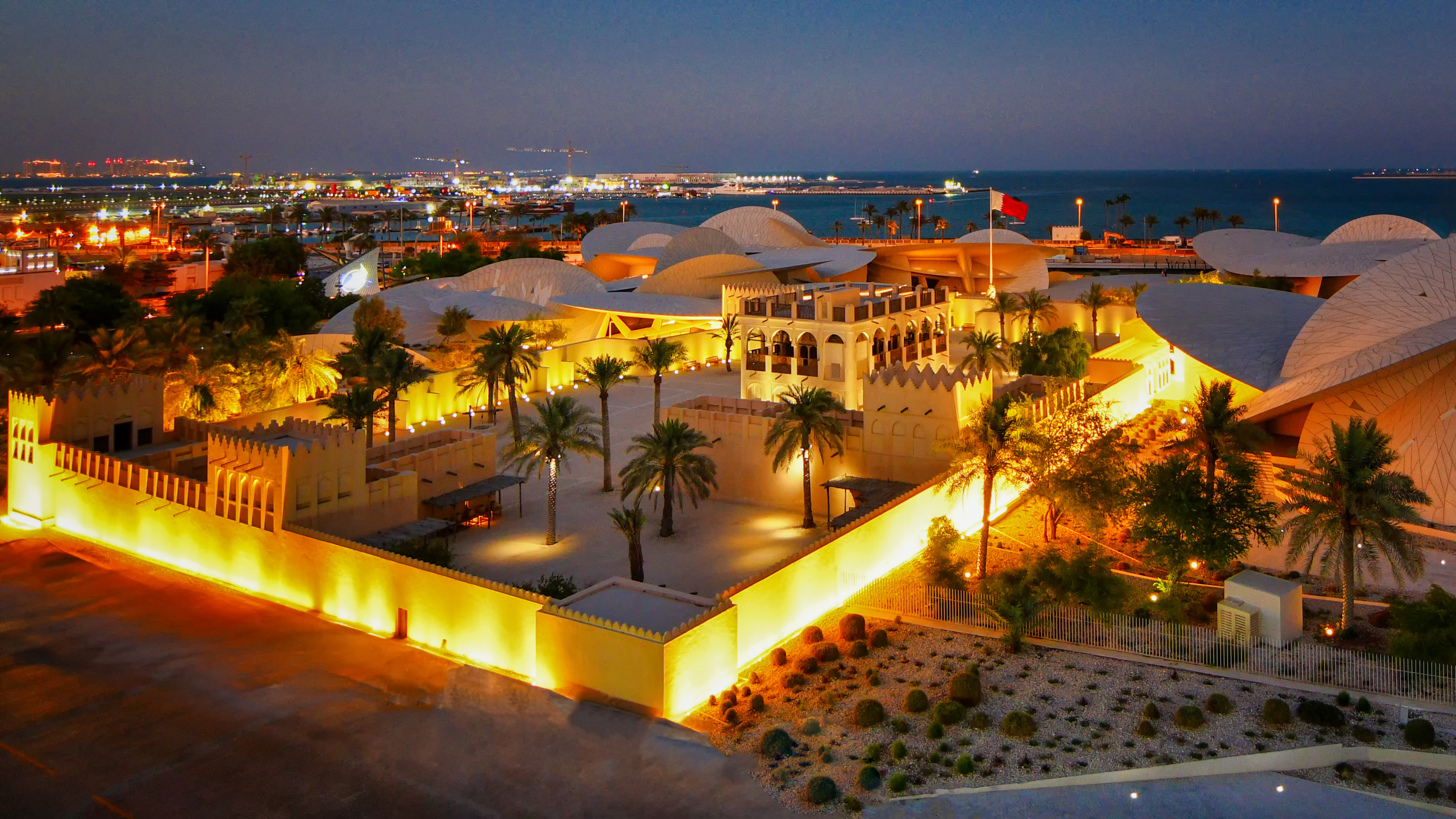
National Museum of Qatar

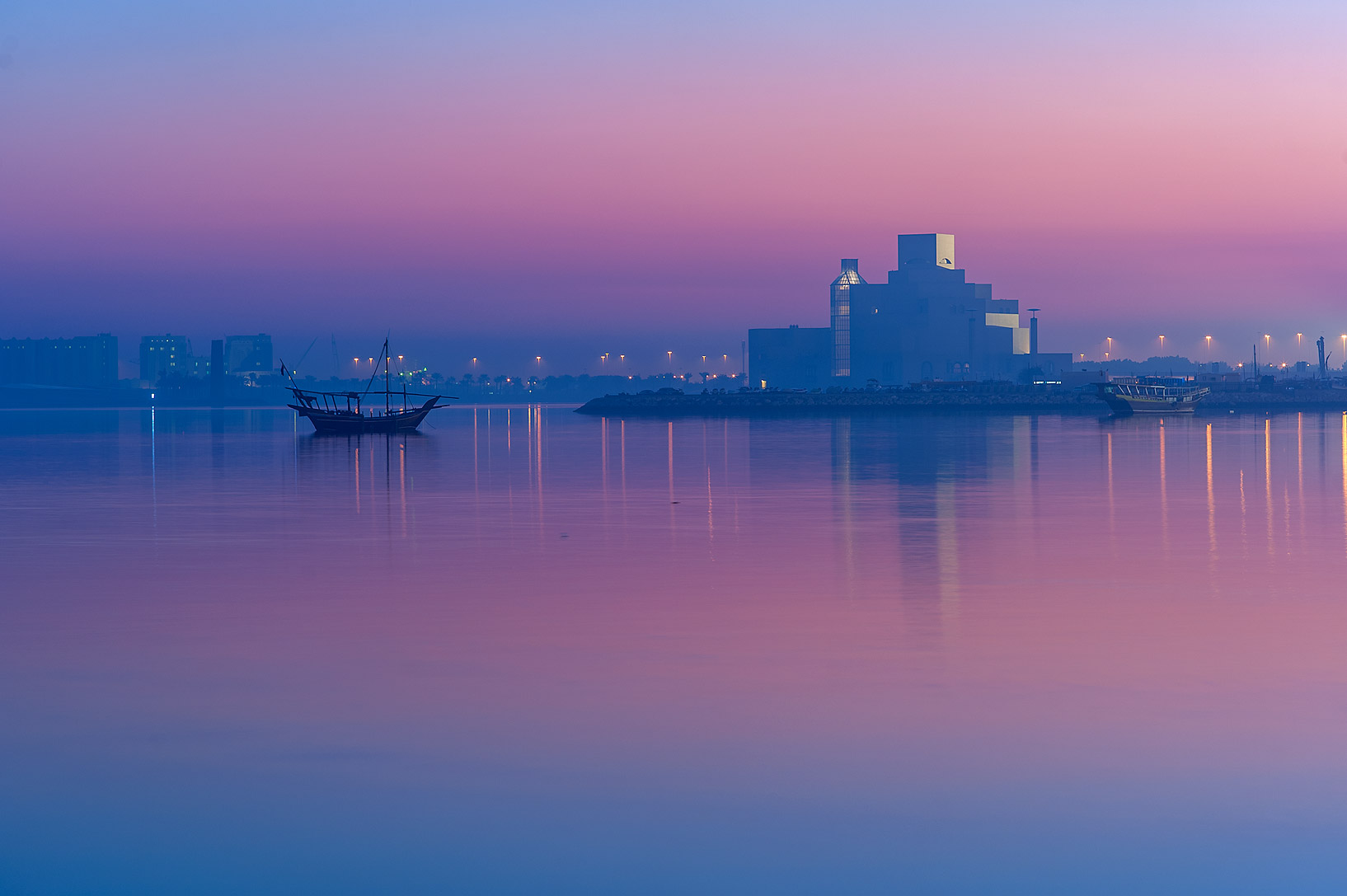
Museum of Islamic Art

=== Museums ===
Upon Khalifa bin Hamad Al Thani's accession to the throne in 1972, he drew up plans for a national museum in order to document the country's heritage and traditions. It was decided that the building would enclose the Old Amiri Palace, a dilapidated early-20th century palace previously occupied by Qatar's former emir, Abdullah bin Jassim Al Thani. Originally named the Qatar National Museum, it was inaugurated on 23 June 1975. This museum was replaced by another similarly named museum, the National Museum of Qatar, built on the same site and opened on 28 March 2019. The building was designed by architect Jean Nouvel who was inspired by the desert rose crystal, which can be found in Qatar.

Qatar Museums was established in 2005 to oversee the construction and maintenance of all museums and collections in Qatar. Two major museums lead the institution: the Museum of Islamic Art opened in 2008, and the Mathaf: Arab Museum of Modern Art, opened in Education City by Qatar Foundation in 2010.

At the 2022 Doha Forum, Qatar Museum's Chairperson, Sheikha Al Mayassa bint Hamad bin Khalifa Al Thani, revealed plans for a further three museums: The first, the Art Mill, located on the site of a historic flour mill, a centre designed by Alejandro Aravena of Elemental, will accommodate presentation facilities for artistic media and for present day art, as well as spaces for educational activities and internship programs, workrooms, a centre for the cultural industries of Qatar, the Dhow Centre, as well as gardens. The second, the Lusail Museum, designed by architect Jacques Herzog of Herzog & de Meuron, a museum of more than 52,000 square meters will comprise different cultural spaces and accommodate the world's most extensive exhibition of orientalist art. The third newly proposed museum, the Qatar Auto Museum, will feature permanent galleries centered around the automobile and its development in Qatar.

=== Venues ===
Katara Cultural Village was established in 2010 on reclaimed land along Doha's coastline as a purpose-built complex for cultural exchange and the arts. Designed to resemble a traditional Qatari village, it features low, sand-colored buildings with flat roofs, shaded alleys, and courtyards, alongside contemporary facilities and a promenade lined with public art. The site contains a variety of venues including art centers and art galleries, which host exhibitions throughout the year. Included among these is the Qatar Museums Gallery, in which the works of both local and international artists are showcased. It also contains Al Bahie Auction House, Qatar's first auction house, which primarily focuses on the arts and which was inaugurated in 2016. The site also hosts several contemporary art organizations, such as the Qatar Fine Arts Society and the Katara Arts Center.

== Art festivals ==
The Qatar International Art Festival (QIAF) is one of the country's largest recurring art events, bringing together local and international artists for exhibitions, workshops, and cultural exchange. Organized annually since 2018 by MAPS International WLL, a Qatar-based arts organisation, the festival has hosted participants from dozens of countries. The inaugural edition at the Doha Fire Station featured 147 artists from 58 nations, selected from nearly 300 applicants, and included over 150 works in various media. Alongside exhibitions, the programme has incorporated live painting demonstrations, panel discussions, and master classes led by established artists. In 2021 QIAF entered a long-term partnership with the Florence Biennale, one of Europe's leading contemporary art events, enabling reciprocal participation for artists in both festivals.

In mid-2025, it was announced that Art Basel, one of the most prominent contemporary art fairs, was launching its fifth fair in Doha, the capital of Qatar. The planned date of the first edition was February 2026.

== Art in public spaces ==
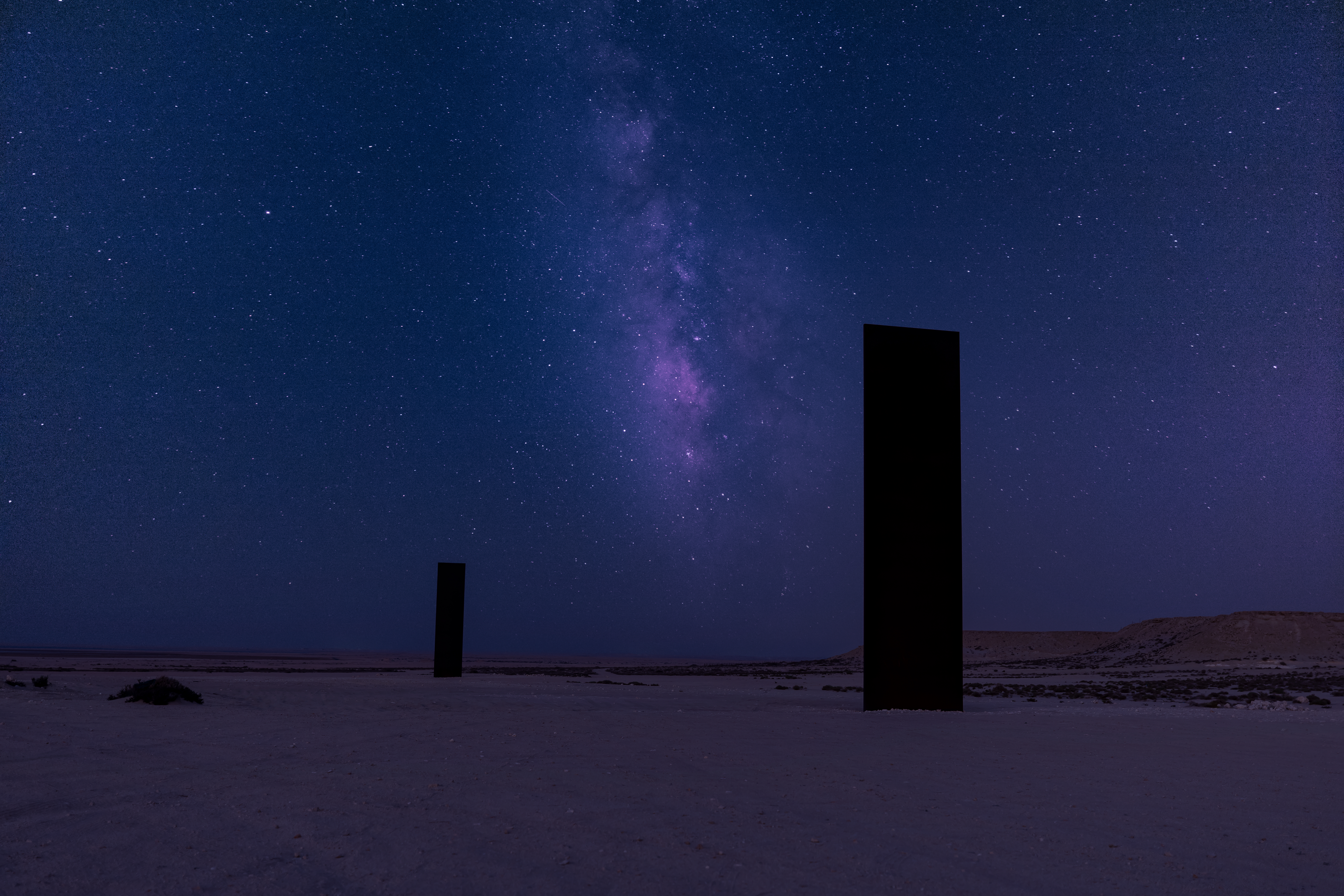
Richard Serra's East-West/West-East sculpture seen in Ras Abrouq at night

Public commissions and civic initiatives have made public art visible in streetscapes, cultural districts, and transport hubs. Murals, sculptures, and large-scale installations are often installed in conjunction with heritage events and museum programming. Qatar Museums, in collaboration with the Public Works Authority (Ashghal), administers a nationwide program to integrate artworks into public spaces across the country. Launched in 2011 with Richard Serra's 7 at the Museum of Islamic Art, the initiative has grown to include more than one hundred installations by Qatari and international artists in locations ranging from heritage markets to desert landscapes. Some of the more well-known art installations are Richard Serra's East-West/West-East in Ras Abrouq, The Miraculous Journey by Damien Hirst at the Sidra Medical and Research Center, and Le Pouce (Thumb) by César Baldaccini at Souq Waqif.

Conceived as part of Qatar Museum's broader cultural mission, the program seeks to create an "outdoor museum" that connects people with art in accessible settings. The program, led by Al-Mayassa bint Hamad Al Thani, commissions works through open calls and partnerships, and is considered one of the first comprehensive public art schemes in the Persian Gulf region.

== Art as a soft power ==
Qatar has increasingly used art as an instrument of soft power, using it to project cultural influence. Al-Mayassa bint Hamad Al Thani, chair of Qatar Museums and sister of the Emir of Qatar, Tamim bin Hamad Al Thani, has spearheaded this effort and has overseen acquisitions valued in the hundreds of millions of dollars, including works by Paul Cézanne and Paul Gauguin. Under her leadership, Qatar has invested heavily in building a world-class collection and hosting major cultural events.

In 2025, Doha was announced as a host city for Art Basel, one of the most prominent contemporary art fairs. Furthermore, the Swiss edition of Art Basel in 2025 prominently featured Qatari sponsorship and programming, including a national pavilion. These efforts are perceived as a strategic move by Qatar to integrate itself into elite cultural circuits traditionally dominated by Euro-American institutions.

== Textiles ==
=== Weaving and dyeing ===
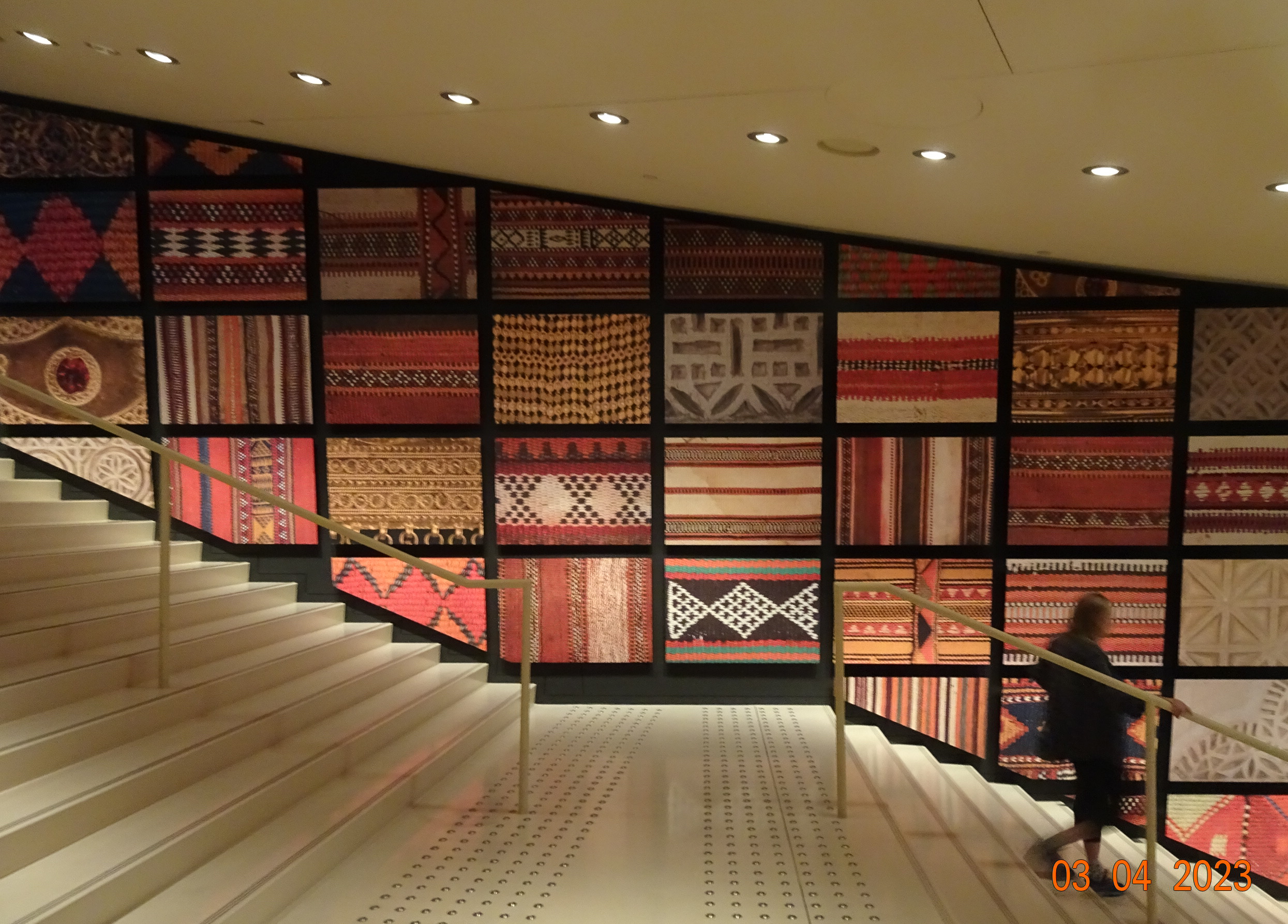
Tapestry patterns on display at the National Museum of Qatar

Weaving and dyeing played a substantial role in Bedouin culture. The process of spinning sheep's and camel's wool to produce cloth was laborious. The wool was first disentangled and tied to a bobbin, which would serve as a core and keep the fibers rigid. This was followed by spinning the wool by hand on a spindle known as a noul. They were then placed on a vertical loom constructed from wood whereupon women would use a stick to beat the weft into place.

The resulting cloths were used in rugs, carpets, and tents. Tents were usually made up of naturally colored cloth, whereas rugs and carpets used dyed cloth, mainly red and yellow. The dyes were made from desert herbs, with simple geometrical designs being employed. The art lost popularity in the 19th century as dyes and cloth were increasingly imported from other regions in Asia.

=== Embroidery ===
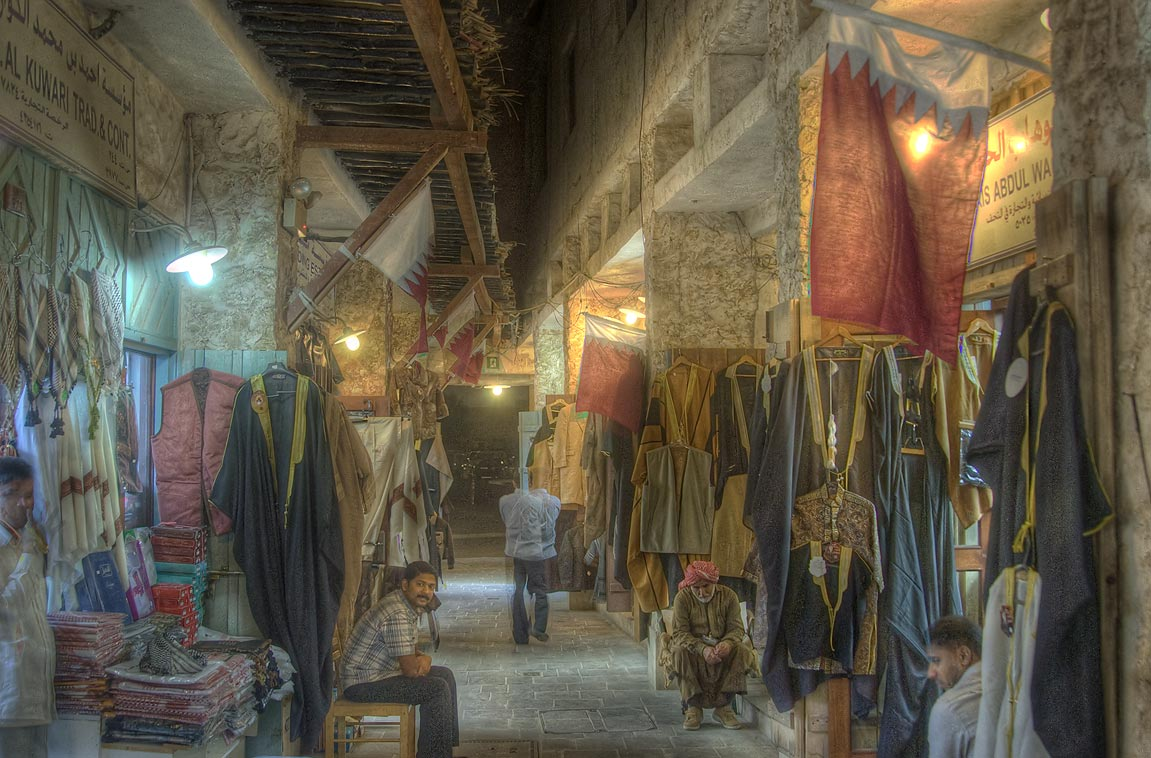
Embroidered dresses on display in Souq Waqif

A simple form of embroidery practiced by Qatari women was known as kurar. It involved four women, each carrying four threads, who braided the threads on articles of clothing, mainly thawbs or abayas. The braids, varying in color, were sewn vertically. It was similar to heavy chain stitch embroidery. Gold threads, known as zari, were commonly used. They were usually imported from India.

Another type of embroidery involved the designing of caps called gohfiahs. They were made from cotton and were pierced with thorns from palm trees to allow the women to sew between the holes. This form of embroidery declined in popularity after the country began importing the caps.

Khiyat al madrasa, translated as "school embroidery", involved the stitching of furnishings by satin stitching. Prior to the stitching process, a shape was drawn onto the fabric by a skilled artist. The most common designs were birds and flowers.

== Crafts ==
=== Shipbuilding ===
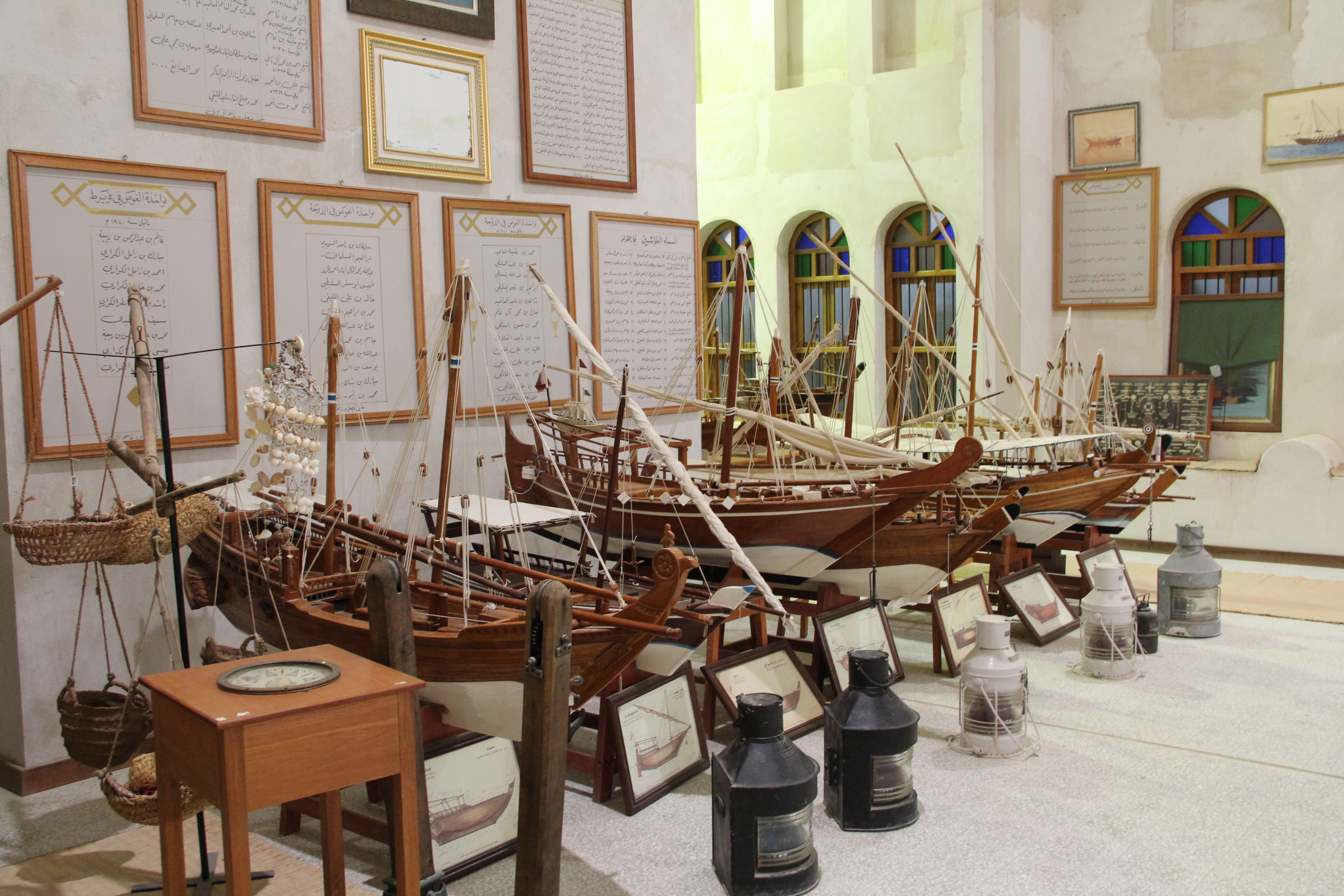
An exhibit showcasing different types of dhows used in Qatar

Given the reliance of coastal communities on fishing and pearling, Qataris developed a variety of boats designed to withstand the shallow and rocky Persian Gulf waters as well as the deeper seas. Builders, known as najjarun, used specific types of wood, such as teak (saj), Indian timber (sim), and African varieties (qart), sourced through regional trade networks. The shipbuilding process typically began with carving the vessel's keel, known as al tarijah, followed by the hull (al sadr) and stern (al milfah or al makhzan). Craftsmen paid great attention to ornamental carvings and decorations adorning the sides of the vessels. Once constructed, the boats were sealed using fish oil to fill any gaps and cracks, rendering them seaworthy.

Among the most common types of boats were batil, jalboot, sambuk, shu'ai, and baghlah, each with specific functions ranging from fishing and trade to pearl diving. These vessels were equipped with sails (al shiraa), oars (al mijadhif), and steering apparatuses (al daffah) suitable for long-distance travel or local expeditions. An important structural element known as al dakl, the vertical mast, was mounted after the hull's completion.

== Architecture ==
=== Forts ===
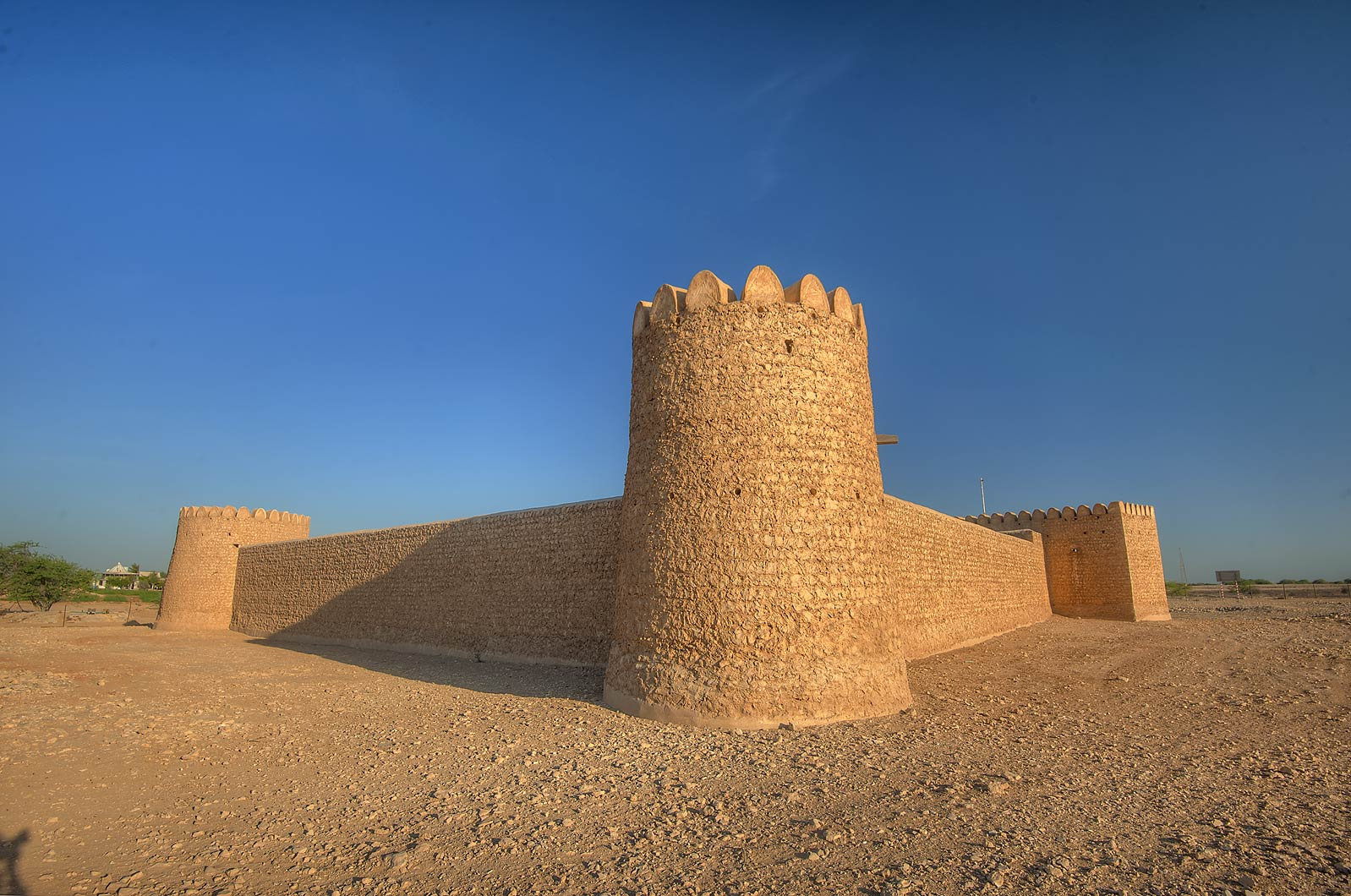
Ath Thaqab Fort

The numerous forts found throughout the Qatari peninsula are a testament to the country's ancient construction methods. Most forts were constructed using mainly limestone, with other constituents such as mud and clay brick also being used. A type of mixture consisting of mud and clay brick known locally as lubnah was sometimes used in the construction of forts, such as in Ar Rakiyat Fort.

=== Traditional architecture ===
Most traditional houses in the capital Doha were tightly packed and arranged around a central courtyard. Some rooms were situated in the courtyard, most often including a majilis, bathroom and store room. The houses were made from limestone quarried from local sources. Walls surrounding the compounds were made up of compressed mud, gravel, and small stones. As they were heavily susceptible to natural erosion, they were protected by gypsum plaster. Mangrove poles wrapped in jute rope provided structural support for the windows and doors.

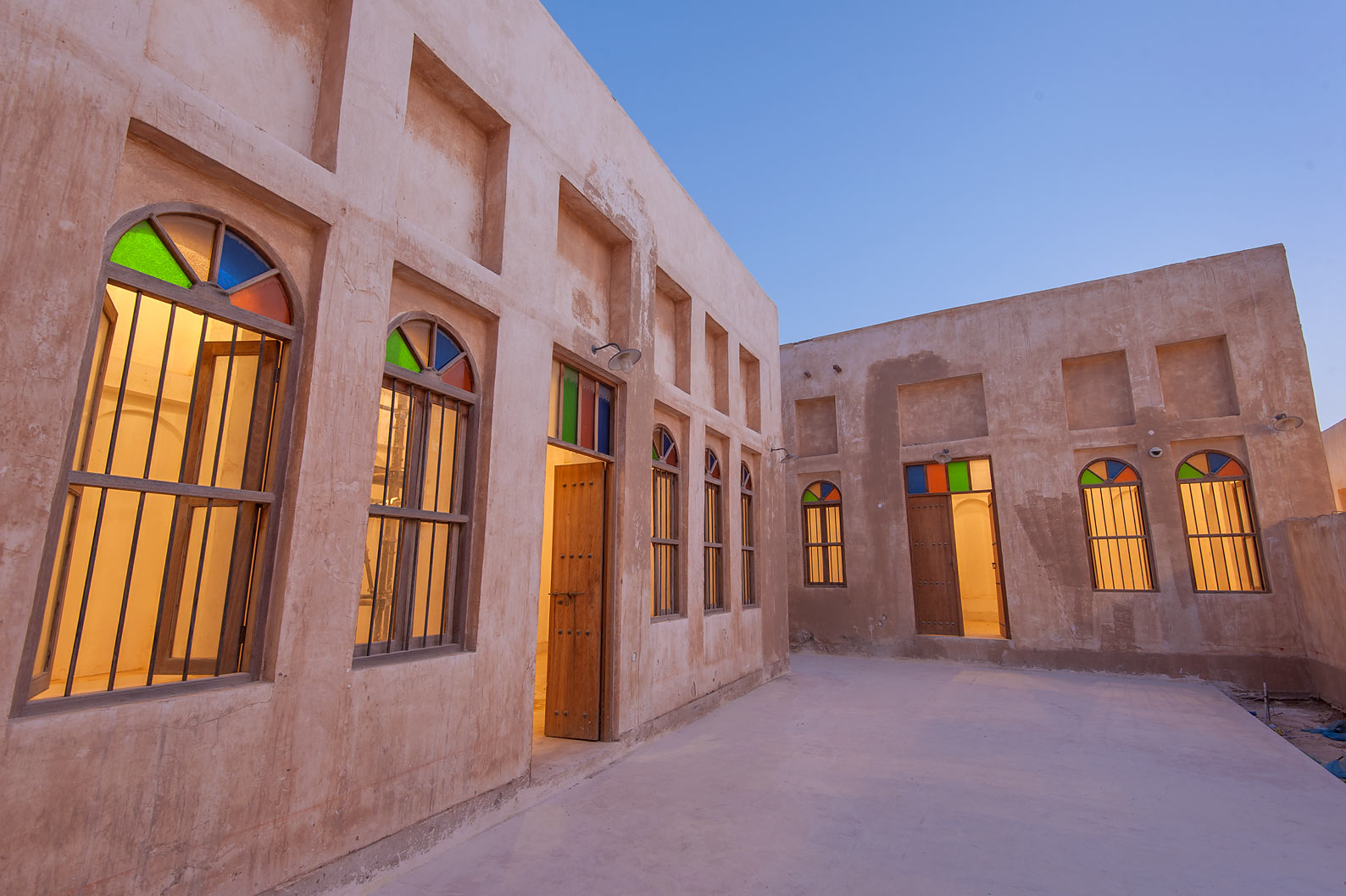
Traditional Qatari houses in Al Wakrah Heritage Village

Roofs were typically flat and were supported by mangrove poles. The poles were covered with a layer of split bamboo and a palm mat locally called manghrour. The mangrove poles often extended past the exterior walls for decorative purposes. Doors were made of metal or wood. Colored glass employing geometrical designs was sometimes used in windows. The local architecture shows the use of the reddish stone of Qatar, as well as little use of wood due to the scarcity of resources in the region.

Several methods were used in traditional architecture to alleviate the harsh climate of the country. Windows were seldom used in order to reduce heat conduction. The badgheer construction method allowed air to be channeled into houses for ventilation purposes. This was accomplished by several methods, including horizontal air gaps in rooms and parapets, and vertical openings in wind towers called hawaya which drew air into the courtyards. Wind towers, however, were not as common in Doha as they were in other parts of the country.

Shortly after Qatar gained independence, many of the districts of old Doha, including Al Najada, Fereej Al Asmakh, and Old Al Hitmi, faced gradual decline, and as a result, much of their historical architecture has been demolished. A number of schemes have been taken to preserve the city's cultural and architectural heritage, such as the Qatar Museums Authority's Al Turath al Hai ("living heritage") initiative.

=== Modern architecture ===
Qatar in the past two decades has pinpointed its place on the world map with prominent global landmarks including Education City which showcases architecture from numerous architects including Rem Koolhaas who designed the Qatar National Library during 2018 and the Qatar Foundation headquarters back in 2014.

Among Qatar's notable architects is Japanese architect Arata Isozaki who contributed towards designing countless buildings in Education City, including the Qatar National Convention Center (QNCC), the Liberal Arts and Science Building (LAS) and the Qatar Foundation Ceremonial Court.

Qatar's art initiatives have expanded tremendously in recent years with the opening of massive great projects including the Doha Fire Station which exhibits art at the heart of the city.

Arts and museums have played a pivotal role in improving Qatar's tourism and inviting people to understand Qatar's history and heritage with the openings of the National Museum of Qatar, Mathaf: Arab Museum of Modern Art, Msheireb Museums and the Museum of Islamic Arts.

Sheikha Al-Mayassa bint Hamad bin Khalifa Al-Thani has played a significant role in bringing art to Qatar, particularly with the latest art installations at the Hamad International Airport (HIA) showcasing pieces of work by numerous global artists in collaboration with Qatar Museums Authority.

Under the guidance of the CEO of Qatar Foundation, Sheikha Moza bint Nasser, Education City has become a home for modernistic buildings originating from worldwide architects contributing to the building of schools, universities, offices, and accommodations for the community.

=== Examples of modern architecture ===
In Education City:

- Qatar National Convention Center (2011) designed by Arata Isozaki
- Qatar Foundation Ceremonial Court (2007) designed by Arata Isozaki
- Qatar Foundation Headquarters (2014) designed by Rem Koolhaas
- Northwestern University in Qatar (2017) designed by Antoine Predock
- Carnegie Mellon University in Qatar (2008) designed by Ricardo Legorreta and Victor Legorreta
- Virginia Commonwealth University in Qatar (1998) designed by Mimar Consult
- Weill Cornell Medical College in Qatar (2003) designed by Arata Isozaki
- Liberal Arts and Science building (2004) designed by Arata Isozaki
- Georgetown School of Foreign Service in Qatar (2010) designed by Ricardo Legorreta and Victor Legorreta
- Texas A&M University in Qatar (2007) designed by Ricardo Legorreta and Victor Legorreta
- Qatar Academy (1997) designed by Al Seed Consultant and Design Studio
- Awsaj Academy (2011) designed by James Cubitt and Partners
- Qatar Science and Technology Park (2009) designed by Woods Bagot
- Strategic Studies Center (2014), also known as Think Bay designed by Office for Metropolitan Architecture (OMA)
- Qatar National Library (2018) designed by Rem Koolhaas
- Sidra Medical and Research Center (2017) designed by Pelli Clarke Pelli Architects
- Al Shaqab (2019) designed by Leigh & Orange Architects
- Student Center (2012) designed by Ricardo Legorreta and Victor Legorreta
- Qatar Faculty of Islamic Studies (2014) designed by Mangera Yvars Architects, which was shortlisted for the 2017 Moira Gemmill Prize for Emerging Architecture
- Mathaf: Arab Museum of Modern Art (2010) designed by Jean-Francois Bodin
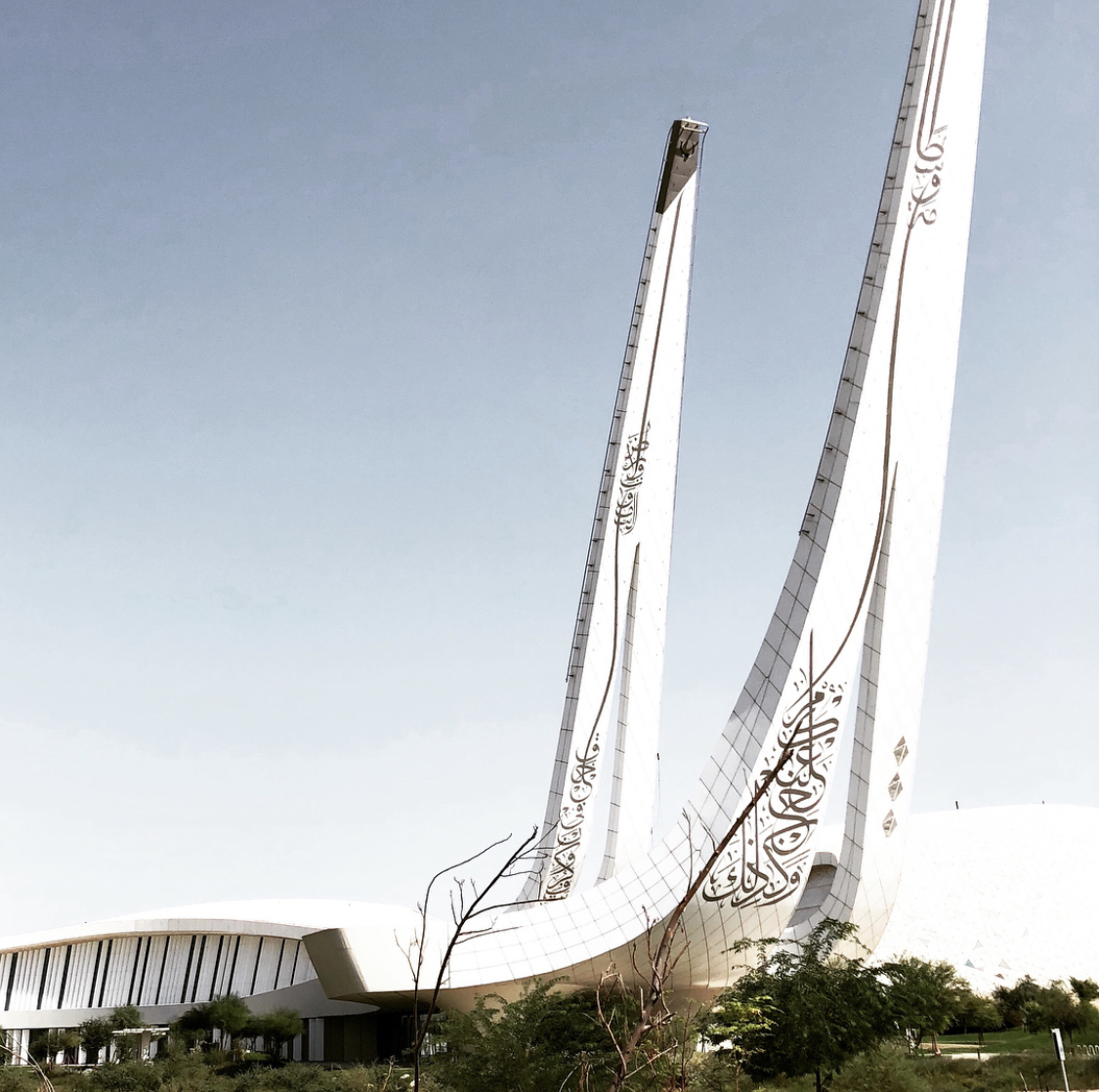
Qatar Faculty of Islamic Studies designed by Mangera Yvars Architects

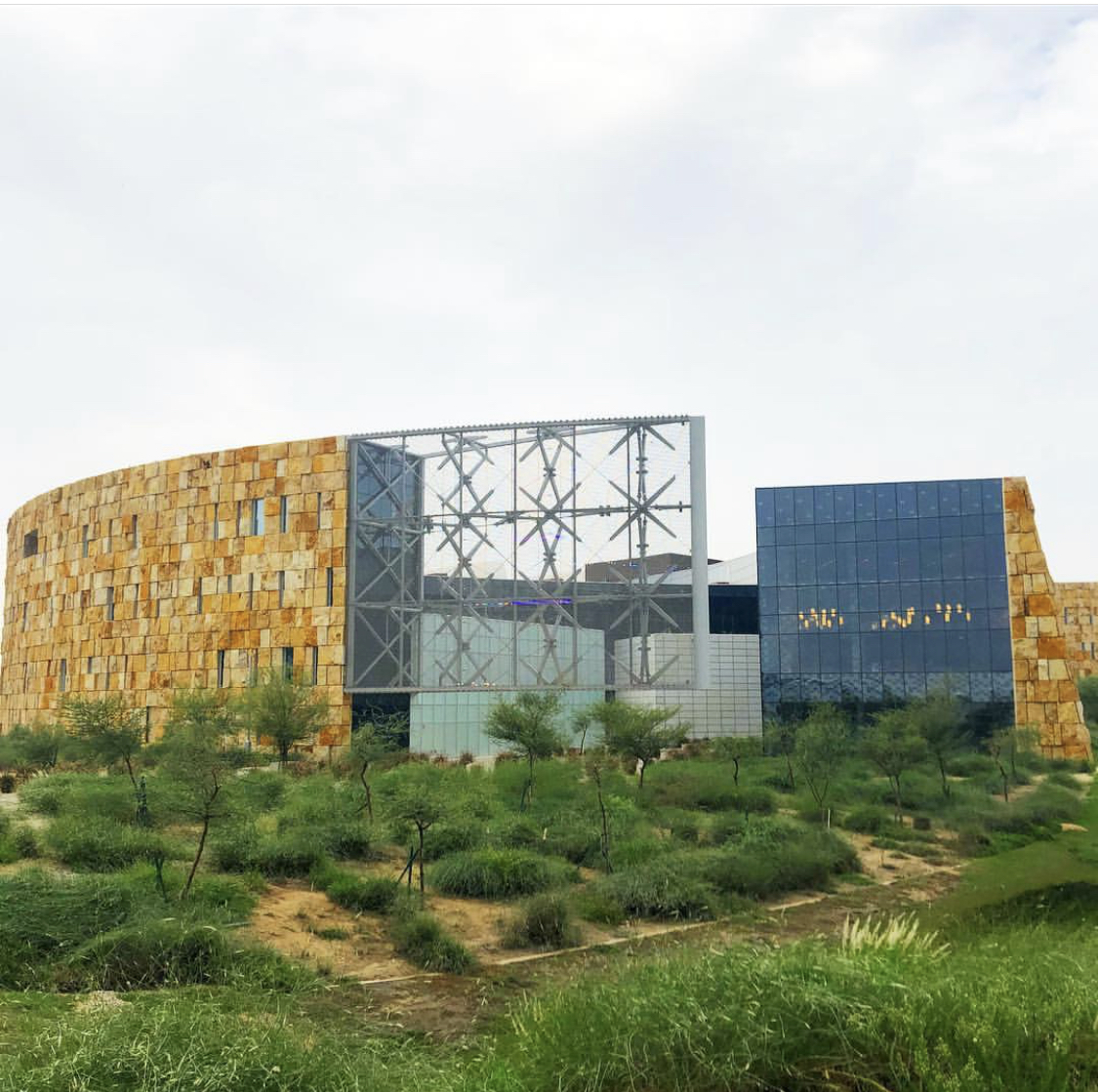
Northwestern University in Qatar designed by Antoine Predock

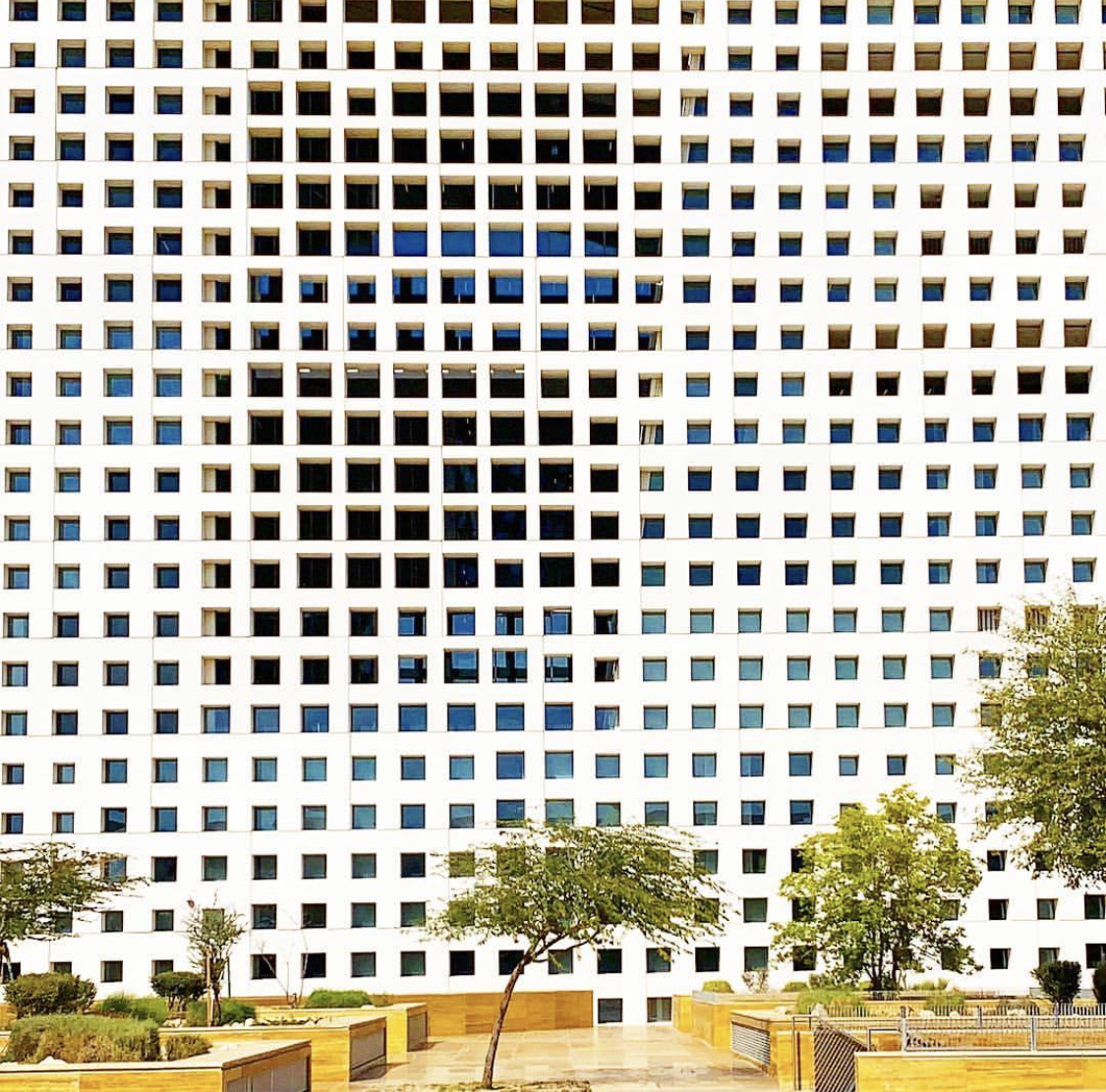
Qatar Foundation Headquarters designed by Rem Koolhaas

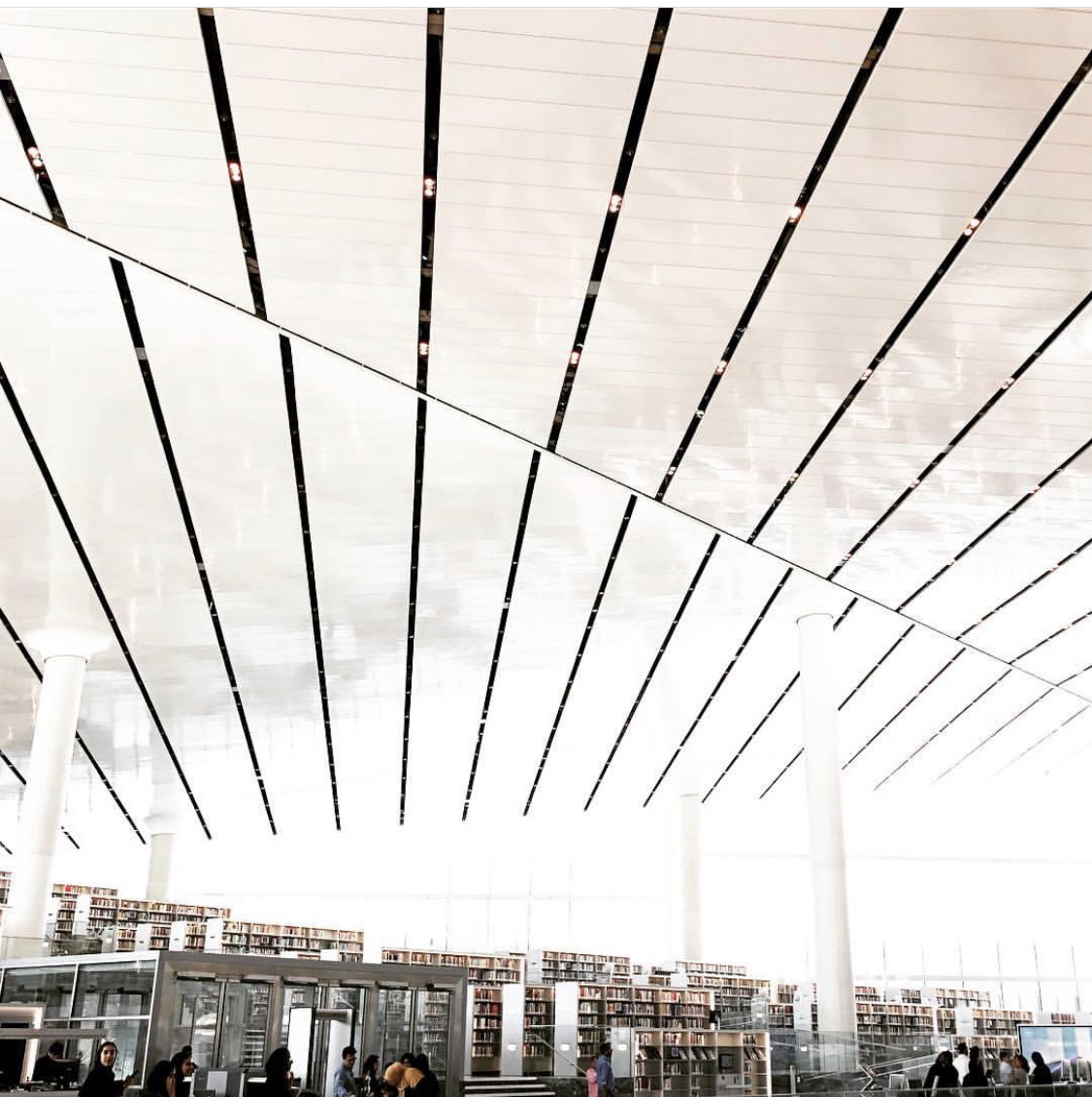
Qatar National Library designed by Rem Koolhaas

== Prehistoric art ==
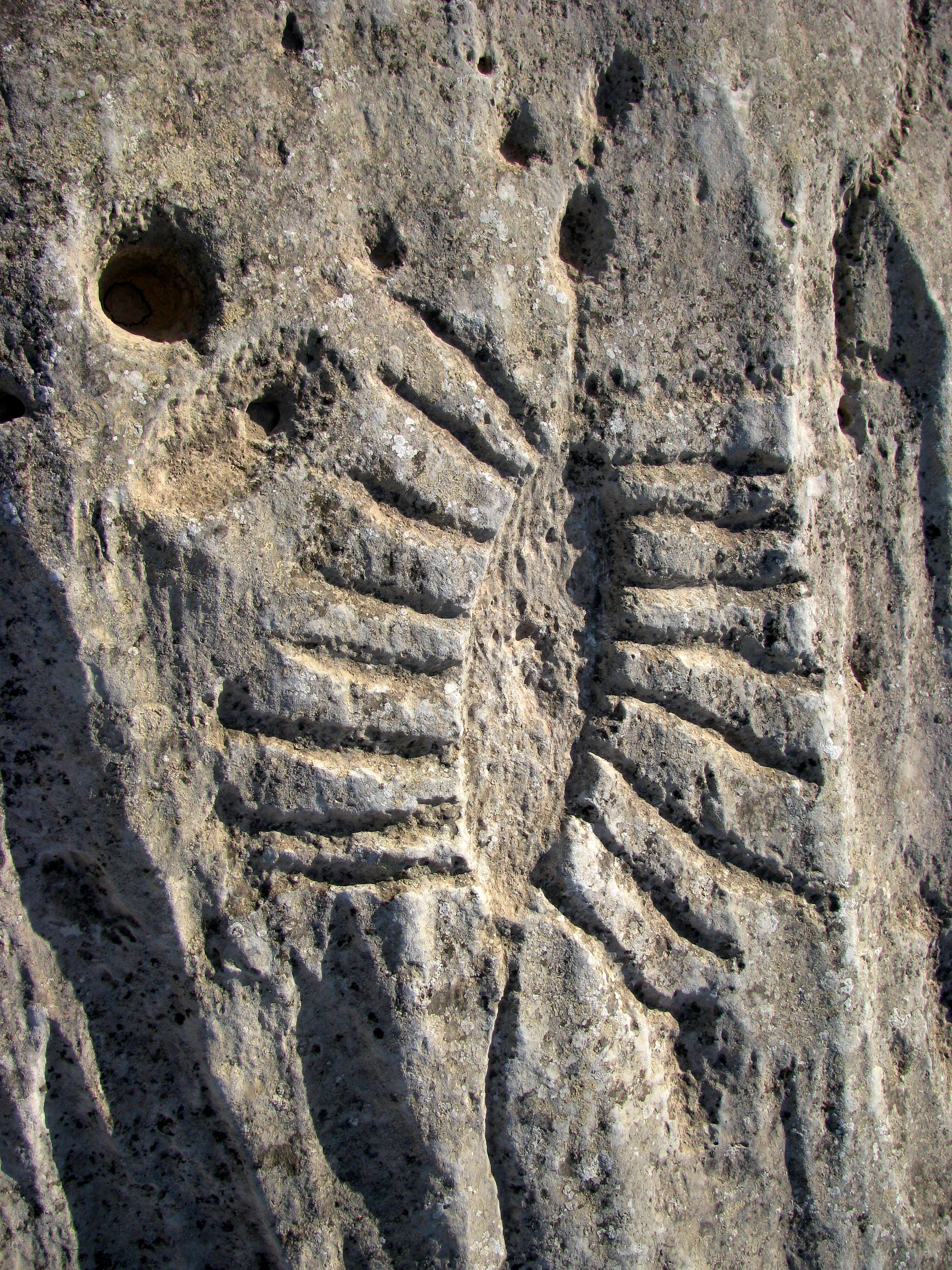
Rock carvings in Jebel Jassassiyeh depicting a boat

Ancient rock carvings have been discovered in eight separate locations in Qatar: Jebel Jassassiyeh, Jebel Fuwayrit, Freiha, Al Ghariyah, Al Jumail, Simaisma, Al Wakrah and Al Qassar. Most of these sites were discovered by Danish archaeological teams in the 1950s and 1960s. The carvings are classified in several categories, including human and animal representation, boat representation, cup-marks, large cavities, geometric designs, tribal marks, and hand- and footprints.

A large number of rock carvings were discovered in Jebel Jassassiyeh, in northeast Qatar, in 1961. Variations in motifs and techniques indicate that the carvings were made through various historical periods. Cup marks are the most common forms of art among the nearly 900 carvings. Other carvings include ships, animals, foot-prints and tribal marks (known as wasum). Different animals are depicted, such as ostriches, turtles, and fish. A large number of the carvings illustrate boats, and this is the only site in Qatar where boat depictions have been recorded. The boats are of different sizes and types, and some contain oars while others do not.

Geometrical designs were recorded at Freiha in four places. They measure 11 to 15 cm in width and 11 to 12 cm in height. Danish archaeologist Peter Glob believed that they were carved by an ancient fertility cult. This theory was disputed by Muhammad Abdul Nayeem, who believes that they are simply abstract symbols or tribal marks.

== Notable artists ==
- Jassim Zaini, probably the most important Qatari artist, founding the modern movement
- Faraj Daham, a Qatari artist and founding member of the Qatari Fine Arts Society, his work addresses social and political topics in painting and installation, often using recycled material and raw material
- Yousef Ahmad, a Qatari painter, art collector and author
- Wafika Sultan Al-Essa, the first professional Qatari female artist
- Salman Al-Malik, a Qatari artist
- Hassan Al Mulla, a Qatari surrealist painter

== See also ==
- Culture of Qatar
- Rock art in Qatar
- Qatari literature

=== Art galleries in Qatar ===
- Museum of Islamic Art, Doha
- Mathaf: Arab Museum of Modern Art

== Bibliography ==
- Abdul Nayeem, Muhammad (1998). Qatar Prehistory and Protohistory from the Most Ancient Times (Ca. 1,000,000 to End of B.C. Era). Hyderabad Publishers. ISBN 9788185492049.
- Abu Saud, Abeer (1984). Qatari Women: Past and Present. Longman Group United Kingdom. ISBN 978-0582783720.
- Kozah, Mario; Abu-Husayn, Abdulrahim; Al-Murikhi, Saif Shaheen; Al-Thani, Haya (2014). The Syriac Writers of Qatar in the Seventh Century (print ed.). Gorgias Press LLC. ISBN 978-1463203559.
