= Anne Collier =

American visual artist

Anne Collier (born Los Angeles, 1970) is an American visual artist working with appropriated photographic images. Describing Collier's work in Frieze art magazine, writer Brian Dillon said, "Collier uncouples the machinery of appropriation so that her found images seem weightless, holding their obvious meaning in abeyance."

Writing in The New York Times, Karen Rosenberg said "Anne Collier’s photographs of vintage books, album covers, posters and other ephemera, taken in an antiseptic white studio, look studiously detached at first. But after some time they reveal themselves as sensitive and involved responses to an earlier generation's visual culture."

== Education and career ==
In 1993, Anne Collier received her BFA from the California Institute of the Arts, in Valencia, California. In 2001 Collier received her MFA at the University of California, Los Angeles (UCLA). She currently lives and works in New York City. She is currently represented by Anton Kern Gallery in New York, The Modern Institute in Glasgow, and Galerie Neu in Berlin.

=== Woman with a Camera ===
Beginning in 2006, Collier has been collecting (re-photographing) images of "women posing with cameras as if they were photographers."

More specifically, this ongoing project tackles the perception of women in the photographic medium. In the series, Collier use common mechanisms found in advertising as she isolates old forms of media—photos, pages from books and magazine, cassette tapes, and record albums—and reshoots them. The re-photographed material typically features a woman holding a camera and by photographing this woman, Collier suddenly switches the subject from the woman photographed to the viewer, thus making the viewer question and reflect their position as a viewer.

As Osman Can Yerebakan, art writer for Art Observed, aptly described Colliers' the Woman with a Camera series: "Film stills of actresses such as Faye Dunaway, Jacqueline Bisset or Marilyn Monroe with cameras in their hands adopt the position of the gazer, staring at the viewer as the roles exchange. These iconic women, commonly positioned as the objects of male gaze, confront the voyeuristic notions of the public eye with cameras in their hands, repositioned as the voyeurs. Attributing physical and emotional power to the camera as a metaphor, Collier celebrates the status as the gazer these women reclaim through their own hands."

The Woman with a Camera series led to the publication of Women with Cameras (Anonymous) in 2017 which collected 80 "found amateur photographs of women with cameras."

=== Woman Crying ===
Starting in the 2010s, Collier has been photographing images from comic strips and vintage album covers that focus on images of women crying. These images are focused in on the depictions of women's tears in these images.

=== Anne Collier, Retrospective in 2014–2015 ===
In 2014, a retrospective of Collier's work opened at Center for Curatorial Studies, or CCS Bard Galleries at Bard College. The exhibition traced her career from 2002 to present. Encompassing around forty works, the exhibition presents several recurring subjects and themes that have dominated Collier’s practice over the past decade. The exhibition includes the notable Woman with a Camera series.

This exhibition has traveled to Museum of Contemporary Art, Chicago on November 22, 2014 through March 8, 2015, and will travel to Aspen Art Museum on April 2 through July 15, 2015, and then at The Art Gallery of Ontario, Toronto from September 23, 2015 to January 10, 2016. The exhibition was organized by curator Michael Darling, and was accompanied by essays by Darling, curator Chrissie Iles, and the novelist Kate Zambreno.

== Works ==
Typically, Collier creates photos from other existing photographic materials to examine the ways meaning and cultural values are embedded in photographic images. Her work typically involves arranged still life compositions of found photographic material (such as record covers, magazine pages, appointment calendars, and postcards).

Re-occurring themes in Collier's work include pop culture and psychology, consumerism, feminism, gender politics, clichés & tropes, and conventions of commercial photography, autobiography, and the act of looking or seeing.

== Collections ==
Collier's works are held in the collections of the Art Institute of Chicago, The Guggenheim, the Institute of Contemporary Art, Boston, the Los Angeles County Museum of Art, the Museum of Contemporary Art Chicago, the Museum of Contemporary Art, Los Angeles, the Museum of Modern Art, the Museum of Modern Art, Warsaw, the National Museum of Women in the Arts. the San Francisco Museum of Modern Art, the Tate Modern, the Walker Art Center, and the Whitney Museum of American Art.
