= Al Jasrah =

District in Qatar

Al Jasra الجسرة
- District
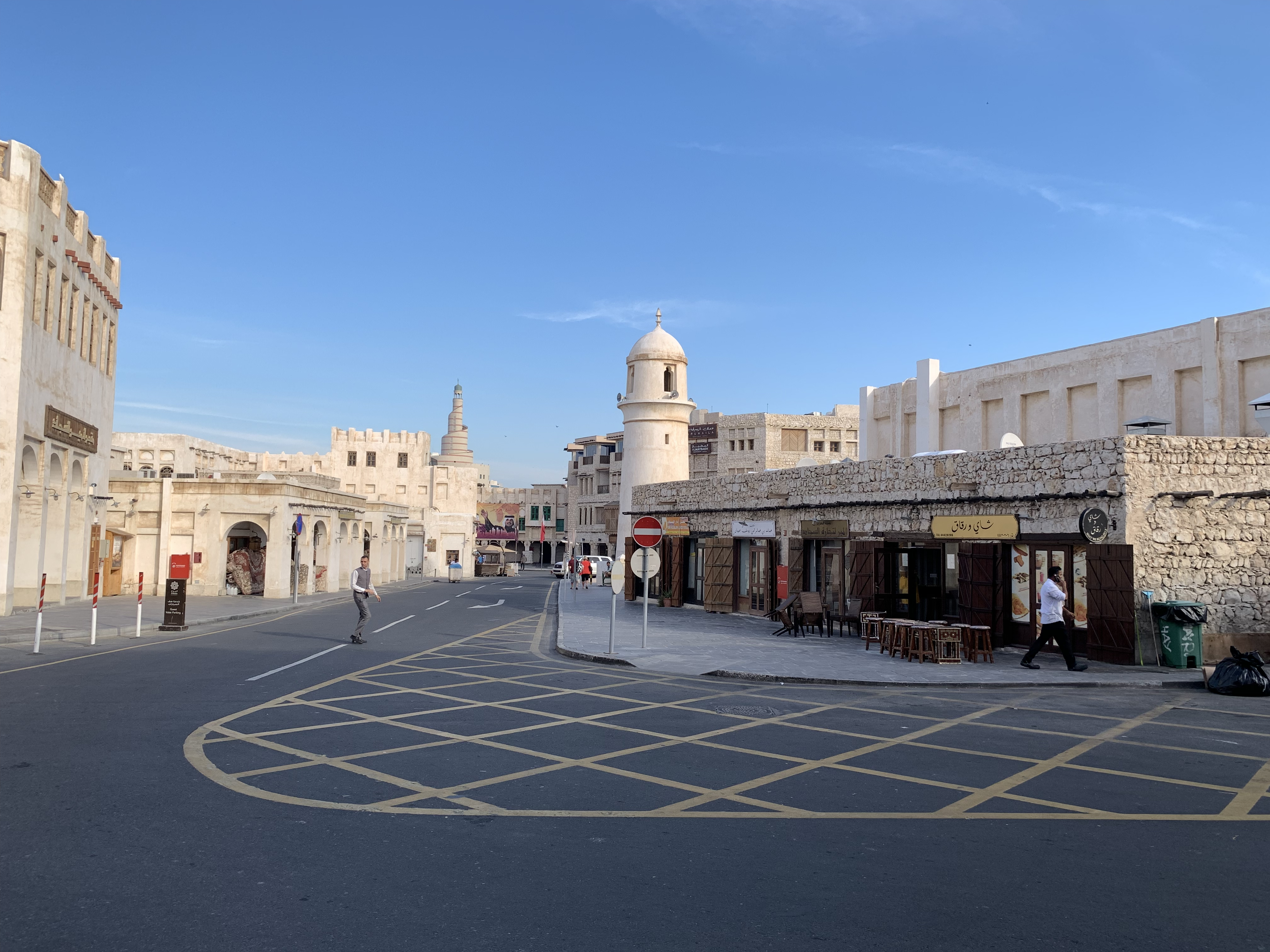
- A street lined with cafes in Souq Waqif

- Location in Qatar Al Jasra (Qatar)
- Coordinates: 25°17′19″N 51°31′56″E
- Country: Qatar
- Municipality: Doha
- Zone: Zone 1
- District no.: 1

Area
  - Total: 0.15 sq mi (0.4 km^{2})

Population (2010)
  - Total: 240

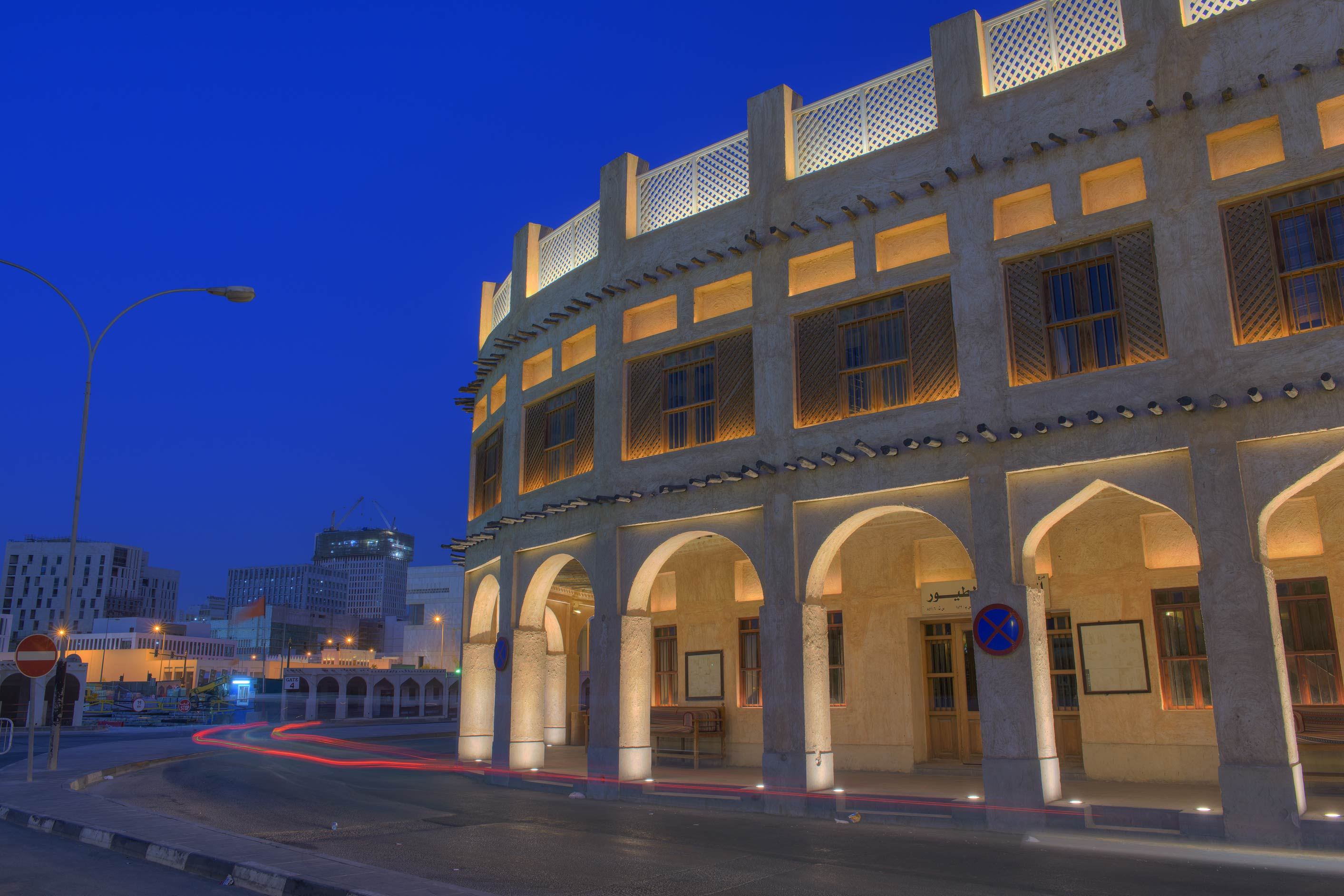
Souq Jaidah on Al Jasra Street in Al Jasrah district, near Souq Waqif, Doha, Qatar.

Al Jasrah (Arabic: الجسرة) is a district in Qatar, located in the municipality of Doha.

It hosts Souq Waqif, one of the largest souqs in Qatar. Other points of interest in the district include Souq Jaidah, the Souq Waqif Falcon Hospital, the Souq Waqif Horse Stables, Abdul Aziz Nasser Theatre, Waqif Art Centre, Al Koot Fort (also known as Doha Fort) and Doha Fort Museum.

Most of its landmarks are accessible through Al Souq Street, Souq Waqif Street and Al Jasra Street. To the immediate east of Al Jasrah is Al Souq, a Qatari commercial district that hosts a number of smaller-sized souqs.

== Etymology ==
The meaning of jasrah in Arabic is "bridge". It was thus named because the partially submerged rocks along its coastline look like a bridge. It is sometimes pronounced as yasrah in local dialect.

== History ==
Prior to 1947, Al Jasrah was known under the names Doha Saghira (Little Doha) and Dowaiha.

Qatar's first hospital was established in Al Jasrah by emir Abdullah bin Jassim in 1947.

Al Jasrah was the hub of Qatari cultural life in the 1950s. It was home to significant families closely linked to the rulers and other tribes, and it became a meeting place for several artists such as Jassim Zaini, Yousef Ahmad, Hassan Al Mulla, Ali Hassan, Salman Al-Malik, and Mohammed Al-Jaida, among others. Their childhood stories and shared passion for art led to the establishment of the first art group" in Qatar ("The Three Friends") and later the Qatari Society for Fine Arts.

In the 1980s Al Jasrah had the most expensive land in all of Qatar. The land price per ft² in 1981 was $171, this however decreased to $60 in 1988, which was still the highest price at that point in time.

== Geography ==
Al Jasrah borders the following districts:

- Al Souq to the east, separated by Grand Hamad Street.
- Al Bidda and Mushayrib to the west, separated by Jassim Bin Mohammed Street.
- Al Najada to the south, separated by Ali Bin Abdulla Street.

== Administration ==
When free elections of the Central Municipal Council first took place in Qatar during 1999, Al Jasrah was designated the constituency seat of constituency no. 1. It would remain constituency seat in the next three consecutive elections until the fifth municipal elections in 2015. In the inaugural municipal elections in 1999, Nasser Mohsen Mohammed Bokshisha won the elections, receiving 46.4%, or 356 votes. Mohammed Abdel Aziz Mourad was elected in the 2002 elections. For the third municipal elections in 2007, Tarek Saif Al-Malki was elected constituency representative. Al-Malki successfully retained his seat in the 2011 elections.

== Historic landmarks ==
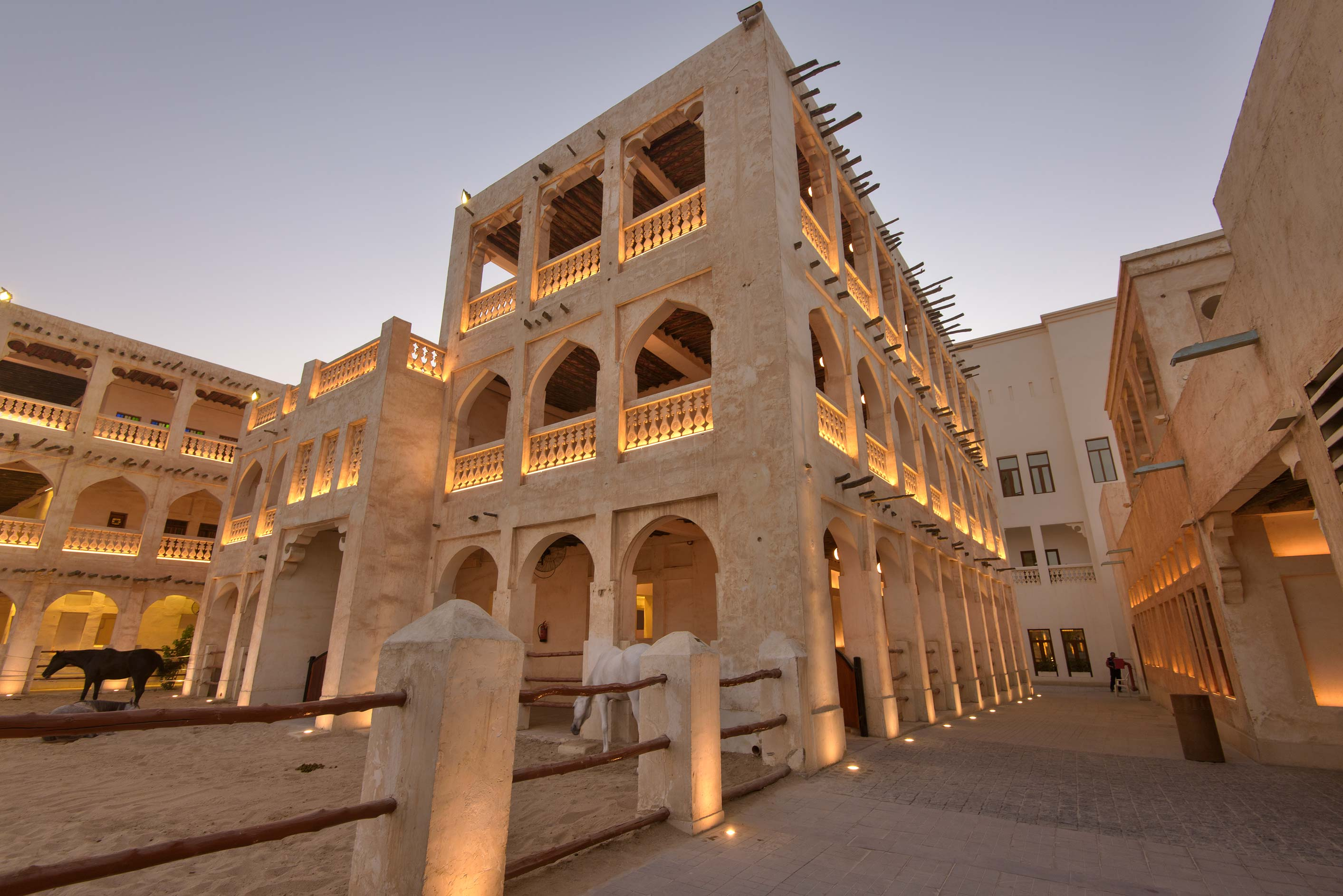
Horse stables on Al Jasra Street in Al Jasra.

=== Nasser Al-Obaidan House ===
A house of the Al-Obaidan family that is located in the district is considered to be a local landmark. Constructed in the early-to-mid 20th century, the house is rectangular and measures 42 m by 31 m. It consists of two main structures which enclose a courtyard; one is shaped as an 'L' whereas the other runs parallel. The 'L' structure contains four rooms while the other structure accommodates seven rooms. There are some decorative features present, such as the shape of the roof parapet above the courtyard.

=== Sheikh Hamad bin Abdullah House ===
A house belonging to a member of the ruling family, the building was constructed in 1930 and is noted for its lavish decorations. It consists of a two-storey structure which encloses a courtyard.

== Transport ==
Major roads that run through the district are Grand Hamad Street, Abdullah Bin Jassim Street, Jassim Bin Mohammed Street, and Corniche Street.

== Demographics ==
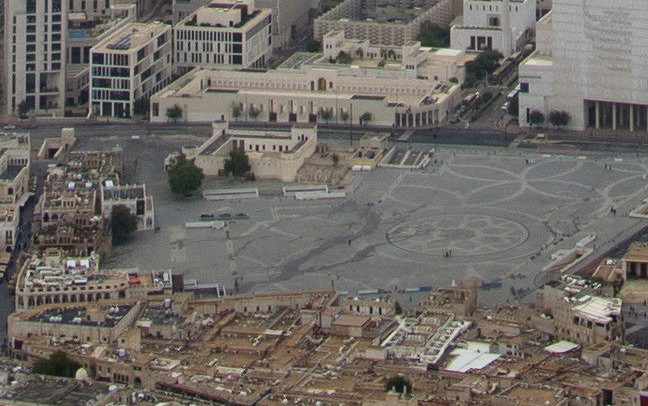
An aerial view of Jassim bin Mohammed Street separating Al Koot Fort in Al Jasrah and the Qatar National Archives building in Mushayrib.

As of the 2010 census, the district comprised 13 housing units and 883 establishments. There were 240 people living in the district, of which 99% were male and 1% were female. Out of the 240 inhabitants, 97% were 20 years of age or older and 3% were under the age of 20. The literacy rate stood at 99.2%.

Employed persons made up 98% of the population. Females accounted for 0% of the working population, while males accounted for 100% of the working population.

Year	Population
1986	1,291
1997	1,047
2004	827
2010	240
