= Wafika Sultan Al-Essa =

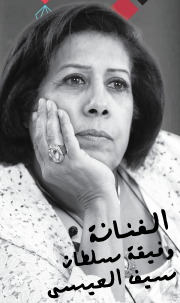
- Al-Essa in 2011
- Born: Wafika Sultan Saif Al-Essa وفيقة سلطان سيف العيسى; 1952; Bahrain
- Education: Helwan University, Cairo, Egypt
- Known for: Painting, plastic arts

Wafika Sultan Al-Essa (Arabic: وفيقة سلطان العيسى; born 1952 in Bahrain) is a Qatari artist specializing in painting and plastic arts. She is one of the first females in the country to study and practice art professionally and has been described as a pioneer of modern art in Qatar.

== Early life and education ==
Al Essa was born in Bahrain in 1952. After receiving a scholarship from the Qatari government, she traveled to Egypt to attend Helwan University (then known as Cairo University) where she graduated with a BA in applied art in 1974.

== Career as an artist ==
Al Essa specializes in painting and plastic arts. She was a regular participant in local art exhibitions since 1972. She attended the second Arab Artists' Federation exhibition held in Morocco in 1976, the fifth and sixth exhibitions of Arab artists held in Kuwait, and the Qatari Art Exhibitions held in 1978 in Paris-London and in Tunis in 1979. She joined the Qatari Fine Arts Society shortly after its inception in 1980, and attended their exhibitions held in 1981 and 1982.

Her styles are influenced by Qatari folklore and the country's natural history. Her style is also influenced by Islamic art, which is evident in her calligraphic works. Her paintings are typically titled after Qatari folk songs and proverbs, and some of the paintings have a symbiotic theme. In her initial years, her interests in plastic arts were hindered by the conservative views held by Qatari society on the art form.

Her art works have been included in official exhibitions held abroad by the emir of Qatar. Her works were put on display in Mathaf: Arab Museum of Modern Art in Doha in 2011. She was one of the two female Qatari artists out of a group of 23 artists who had their works displayed. Her works were later put on permanent display in the museum.

In 2014, she won the Arab's Woman Awards for best Qatari artist.

In 2020 she was part of the "Lived Forward: Art and Culture in Doha from 1960–2020" exhibition in the Mathaf Museum.

In March 2022 some of her artworks were featured in the AIR 6 program at the Fire Station.

== Career in other fields ==
Al-Essa previously worked as a production designer for Qatar TV. She also previously worked in the Qatari embassy in Cairo.

She owns a private consultancy business for architecture and design.

== Bibliography ==
- Abu Saud, Abeer (1984). Qatari Women: Past and Present. Longman Group United Kingdom. ISBN 978-0582783720.
