= Thomas Docherty =

Thomas Docherty may refer to:

- Tommy Docherty (1928–2020), Scottish football manager
- Thomas Docherty (politician) (born 1975), MP for Dunfermline and West Fife
- Tom Docherty (1924–2020), English footballer
- Thomas Docherty (academic)

== See also ==
- Thomas Doherty (disambiguation)
