= Al Souq (Doha) =

Al Souq السوق
- District
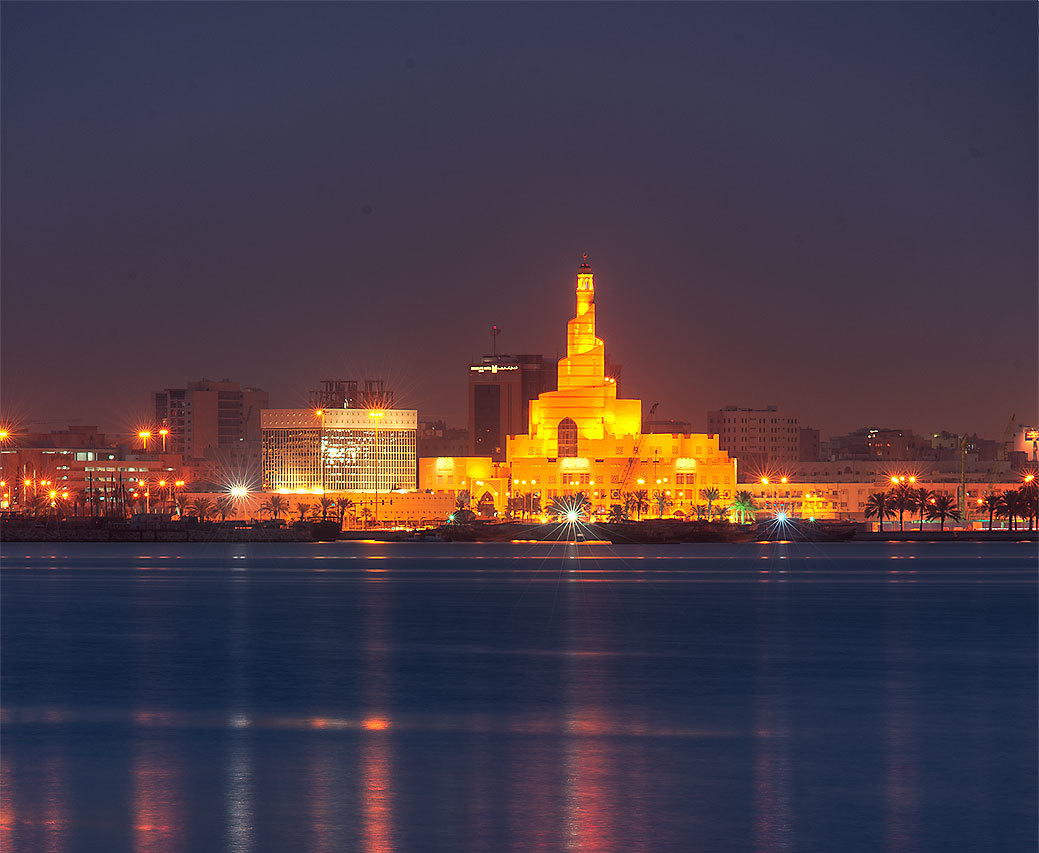
- The Qatar Central Bank (center, left) and Abdulla Bin Zaid Al Mahmoud Islamic Cultural Center (center, right) as seen from the Doha Corniche promenade.

- Location within Doha Location within Qatar
- Coordinates: 25°17′20″N 51°32′13″E
- Country: Qatar
- Municipality: Doha
- Zone: Zone 7
- District no.: 9

Area
  - Total: 0.3 km^{2} (0.12 sq mi)

Population
  - Total: 679
  - Density: 2,300/km^{2} (5,900/sq mi)

Al Souq (Arabic: السوق, romanized: As Sūq; also spelled As Sawq) is a Qatari commercial district in the municipality of Doha. It was named for its high density of souqs (public marketplaces) in the southern section of the district.

Abdullah bin Jassim Street services numerous government buildings and banks in the northern end of the district, including Abdulla Bin Zaid Al Mahmoud Islamic Cultural Center, Qatar Central Bank, the Ministry of Economy and Finance, and the Supreme Council for Economic Affairs and Investment. All of the district's souqs are located south of Abdullah bin Jassim Street. Its souqs include Souq Al Badi, Souq Al Faleh, Souq Al Asiery, Souq Al Dira, and Souq Al Jaber.

Doha's largest souq, Souq Waqif, is located to the immediate west of the district in Al Jasrah, which is separated from Al Souq by Grand Hamad Street.

== Geography ==
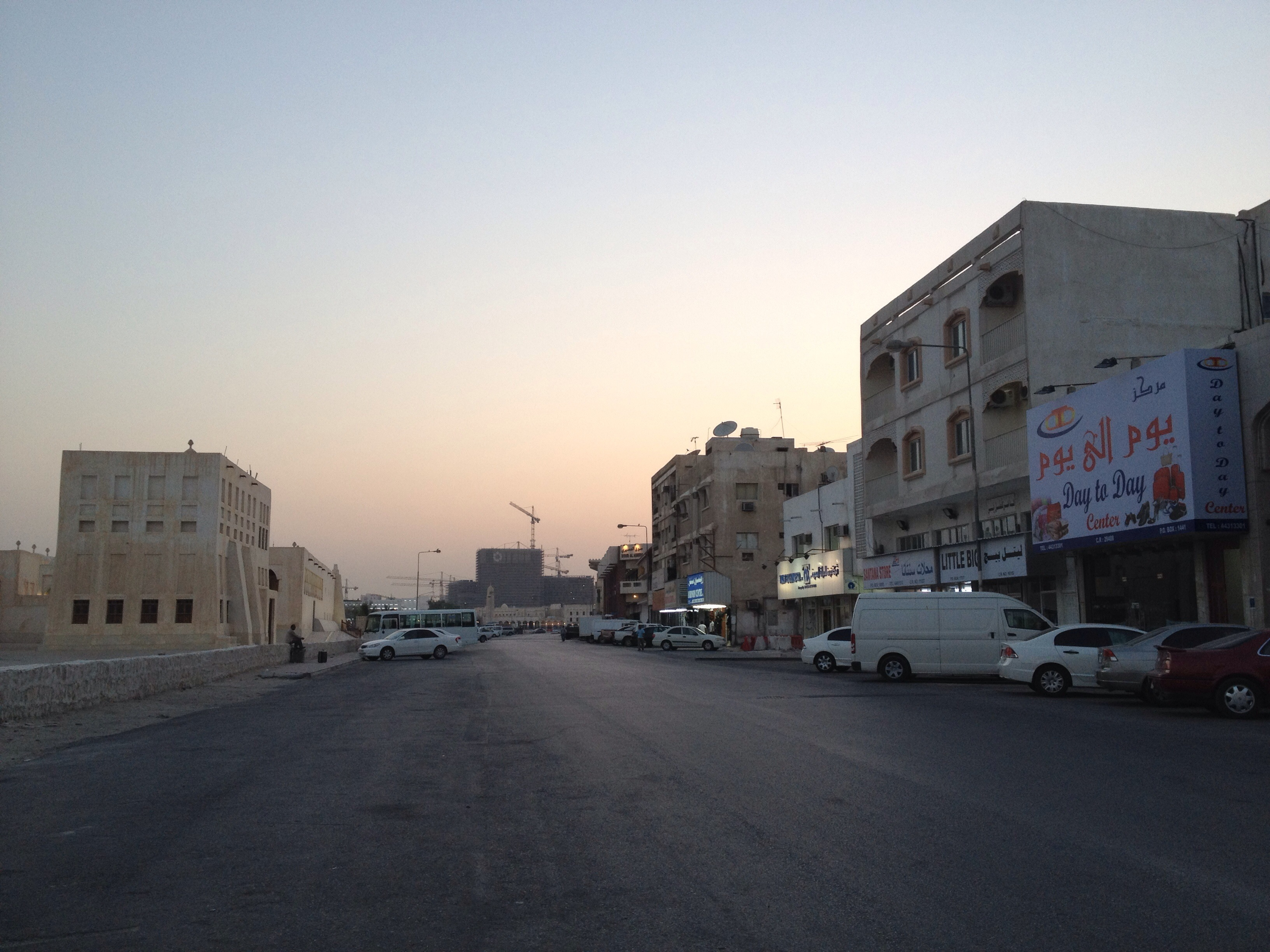
Shops in Al Souq, including Souq Al Asiery

Al Souq borders the following districts:

- Al Mirqab to the east, separated by Jabr Bin Mohammed Street.
- Al Jasrah to the west, separated by Grand Hamad Street.
- Old Al Ghanim to the south, separated by Ali Bin Abdullah Street.

== Transport ==
Major roads that run through the district are Grand Hamad Street, Abdullah Bin Jassim Street, Ali Bin Abdullah Street, and Corniche Street.

== Demographics ==
As of the 2010 census, the district comprised 83 housing units and 699 establishments. There were 679 people living in the district, of which 97% were male and 3% female. Out of the 679 inhabitants, 97% were 20 years of age or older and 3% were under the age of 20. The literacy rate stood at 97.8%.

Employed persons made up 97% of the population. Males accounted for 100% of the working population.

Year	Population
1986	1,484
1997	1,353
2004	1,901
2010	679
