= Jassim Zaini =

Qatari artist (1943–2012)

- جاسم الزيني
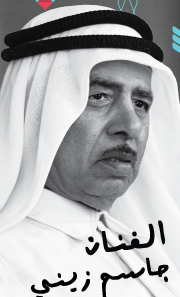
- Portrait of Zaini in 2011
- Born: 1943; Doha, Qatar
- Died: 1 October 2012 (aged 68–69); Qatar
- Education: Baghdad College of Fine Arts, Baghdad, Iraq
- Known for: Painting, plastic arts
- Notable work: Qatari Features (1972)
- Style: Realism, Expressionism, Cubism, Impressionism, Surrealism, and Abstract art

Jassim Zaini (Arabic: جاسم الزيني; 1943 – 1 October 2012) was a Qatari artist who was widely regarded as a leading figure in the development of Qatari art, and often referred to as "the father of modern Qatari art". He described his style as "advanced realism". Renowned for his ability to incorporate expressive realism with elements of Cubism, Impressionism, and Surrealism, his works, deeply rooted in the local environment, reflect the people, traditions, and transformations of Qatar from the 1950s through the 1970s.

One of his most notable works is Qatari Features (1972), which highlights Qatari cultural elements by portraying a girl sewing buttons on her brother's shirt while he wears a ghutra and agal, and she herself wears a bukhnuq.

== Biography ==
=== Childhood and education ===
Zaini was born in Qatar's capital city Doha in 1943 to a craftsman father, Mohammed Zaini. As a child, he would observe his father intricately decorating house walls with blue and orange hues. He also watched his father create various ornaments from gypsum and small wooden ships of different shapes, as well as sculpted animal figurines. Later, his father worked in importing and selling Persian carpets. This exposure, as well as his family's encouragement, fostered his artistic development from an early age. He also found support from his art teachers during his primary schooling, who demonstrated the fundamentals of drawing to him, particularly of natural landscapes, and encouraged his participation in school exhibitions.

In middle school, Zaini would continue to receive guidance from his art instructors. He would also begin experimenting with new materials and canvases during this period. In 1955, he would paint a billboard depicting Syrian-Egyptian singer Farid al-Atrash above his father's carpet shop in Souq Waqif. Throughout the late 1950s, he continued to design signs and advertisements for local businesses. From 1964, he attended the Baghdad College of Fine Arts, where he received mentorship from several prominent Iraqi artists, including Faeq Hassan, Hafidh al-Droubi, Ismail Al-Shaikhly, and Atta Sabri. Upon graduating in 1968, he became the first Qatari in history to attain a degree in fine arts.

=== Career ===
After graduating from the College of Fine Arts in Baghdad in 1968, Zaini returned to Doha. In recognition of his talent, the state appointed him an art education supervisor in the Ministry of Education: a role that did not hinder his artistic pursuits or contributions to Qatari cultural life. He drew cartoons and designed book and magazine covers during his tenure, including the cover of the first issue of "Doha Cultural Magazine".

Zaini sold his first painting to the Ministry of Information when it commissioned him to create a piece of Sheikh Zayed bin Sultan Al Nahyan to commemorate a Gulf Cooperation Council meeting. He set the record for the most expensive painting sold in Qatar when he sold one of his paintings for QAR 5,000.

In 1971, as the art movement in Qatar began to mature, the Al Jasra Cultural Club took on the responsibility of uniting talented artists. Zaini, in addition to his role as an art education supervisor at the Ministry of Education, was a member of the club's administrative committee. Through his position and involvement in Al Jasra Club, Zaini gathered many emerging talents, providing them with guidance in aspects such as color, line, and space. Among his students were several who went on to become prominent artists in the industry, such as Yousef Ahmad, Salman Al Malik and Hassan Al Mulla.

He created what would be regarded by many as his masterpiece in 1972, under the title Qatari Features, to general acclaim in both Qatar and the wider Arab world. In this painting, Zaini depicted a girl sewing buttons on her brother's shirt while he wears a ghutra and agal, while she herself wears a bukhnuq, a traditional head and chest covering. In an interview, Zaini would remark on the painting, saying, "In it, there's a boy, representing my personal experience as I grew up in a household with no sisters, only brothers. The girl in the painting is sewing a button on my clothing. Using a modern and advanced artistic style, I made the body somewhat elongated to fully display the girl's figure, with the knee positioned away from the torso to indicate artistic movement and a sense of modesty". This painting is currently on display at Mathaf: Arab Museum of Modern Art.

Throughout his career, Zaini took part in numerous local exhibitions and regional biennales. These included the second Arab Biennial in Rabat in 1976, the Cairo Biennial in 1984 and 1986, the Bangladesh Biennale in 1986, and the Ankara International Biennale in 1986 and 1988.

Upon the inauguration of the National Museum of Qatar in 1975, he served as the museum's first curator. He also served as the first Director of the Museums and Antiquities Department at the Ministry of Culture. In 1980, he served as the first President of the Qatari Fine Arts Society.

He received the State Appreciation Award from the government of Qatar in 2007 for his contributions to the field of visual arts.

=== Death and legacy ===
Zaini died on 1 October 2012 at the age of 70. His funeral was held the next day at Mesaimeer Cemetery and was attended by many high-ranking officials, fellow artists, and other members of the community.

In December 2012, the Ministry of Culture inaugurated the Jassim bin Mohammed Zaini Hall at the Ministry of Culture, Arts and Heritage Tower as an arts venue, posthumously naming it after Zaini in honor of his contributions to the country's art scene. Many of his paintings have been collated in a 100-page book published by the Ministry of Culture, while hundreds of others are preserved in his son's private museum.

The Katara Cultural Village commissioned the creation of a mural depicting Zaini's most notable painting, Qatari Features (1972), installed within Katara. The mural comprises 1,060 ceramic pieces coated using the UV Epoxy method, ensuring their durability.

== Style ==
Zaini's art, which he defined as 'advanced realism', was largely based on his local environment and included themes of social bonds, rapid modernization, and Qatar's cultural heritage. His work captures a specific era in Qatar, from the 1950s to the 1970s, during which the nation transitioned from a pearling and fishing backwater to a rapidly developing and thriving country. Zaini immersed himself in daily life, capturing his impressions in his art. He depicted the Qatari people – one of his central concerns – in realistic, expressive, and sometimes symbolic styles to highlight their characteristics. His paintings consistently featured people in their activities, aspirations, and struggles, often brimming with vivid expressions.

Zaini showed flexibility in his artistic style, with his paintings depicting several styles such as Expressionism, Cubism, Impressionism, Surrealism, and Abstract art. Various mediums were used by him, including plastic arts, oil paintings, pencil drawings, and engravings. From the 1990s, Zaini produced works incorporating collage techniques that combined realistic and expressive elements with everyday objects like boxes, wood, bottles, nails, fishing nets, and old tools. Additionally, Zaini used paper pulp to create textured, geometric circular shapes arranged in equal intervals, adding depth to his artworks.

Zaini's works reveal a deep sensibility in his lines and color preferences. Despite his diversity in form and style, each painting bears an unmistakable signature of the artist, using color to elicit the intended moods and emotions.

=== Themes ===
Natural landscapes often served as inspiration for Zaini's works. He depicted the sea in numerous paintings such as Al-Ashar, The Fortified Fishing, Inspired by the Sea, Fish Seller, Net and Fish, Hunting on Land and Sea, and The Fortified 1 and 2. He also captured traditional Qatari architecture and nature, highlighting the decorative elements and the interplay of light and shadow on buildings. Furthermore, he captured the characteristics of both desert and marine environments. Rather than replicating nature and the environment photorealistically, Zaini employed expressive artistic angles and maintained a realistic perspective. His works created the appropriate atmosphere for each painting, the use of color varying between realistic, expressive, and symbolic.

Zaini portrayed social relationships and customs in his paintings, illustrating themes such as folk medicine, marriage rituals, celebrations, children's play, and social gatherings. His documentary-style works depicted the living and economic realities of Qatari life in paintings like Fi Al-Sheera, A'id min Al-Sheera, Fish Seller, and Al-Ashar, among others.

Some of his works touch on the national and regional issues affecting the Arab world. He was deeply moved by the Israeli–Lebanese conflict, and particularly the 1982 Lebanon War. He expressed his emotions in the painting The Sad Summer, depicting a towering Lebanese cedar tree with deep roots emerging from a bullet casing. In the background, a weeping eye transforms its tears into a stream nourishing the cedar tree's roots. Next to the tree, a bullet casing spills blood onto the ground, meant to symbolize Lebanon's enduring strength.

Zaini's works also reflected the solidarity among Gulf Cooperation Council (GCC) countries in pieces like In the Shadow of Cooperation, Inspired by the GCC, Sheikh Zayed bin Sultan Al Nahyan, Gulf Security, and The Tanker War. For example, in In the Shadow of Cooperation, Zaini painted the GCC emblem against a warm background, with hands and fists raised towards the sky, bearing banners with slogans such as "The GCC: A New Dawn in Gulf History", "United We Stand", and "Hold Fast to the Rope of Allah Together".

== Works ==
In 1969, the Ministry of Education commissioned him to create three murals. The first mural is the largest, measuring 222 × 432 cm, and crafted from colored mosaic tiles. This artwork symbolizes the importance of knowledge and cultural advancement in Qatar, emphasizing schools as centers of intellectual growth. Zaini combined realistic and symbolic elements to create a three-dimensional effect, with the use of vivid primary colors contributing to the overall visual impact. It is prominently displayed at the main entrance of the Ministry of Education building in Doha. The second and third murals are smaller, each measuring 80 × 110 cm, and are also located within the Ministry. Zaini utilized colored cement paste in a light brown hue to emphasize Arabic calligraphy. One mural features the word "Qatar", while the other displays the phrase "Knowledge is Light". Although they use the same color palette for the shapes and backgrounds, careful observation reveals their distinct artistic elements.

Some of the more well-known of his paintings created from the 1970s to 1990s include titles such as The Branding, Discovery, Portrait of My Daughter, Moonlit Night, The Lost, The Artisan, Henna Night, Erasure, Girls' Play, Official Procession, Procession, Debran, From the Cave of Hira, Dream, Hunting on Land, Safe Harbor, Net and Fish, Going to the Market, and Appetite of the Salty Cat. These works mainly consist of various depictions of Qatari people and the local landscape.

His work has been shown at multiple museums including The Block Museum of Art in Illinois and Mathaf: Arab Museum of Modern Art in Qatar. One of his works, Knights of Poetry – a compilation of portraits for over 60 local and regional poets – was shown at an exhibition in Doha as part of the city's selection as the 2010 Arab Capital of Culture.

=== Expressive realism works ===
Zaini's paintings Qatari Features (1972) and Discovery (1975) exemplify expressive realism, a style he employed in many works. These works mainly depict the Qatari people engaged in their daily lives and activities. Zaini rendered each scene with technical precision, employing appropriate colors, designs, shapes, and backgrounds to convey the intended meaning. Qatari Features (1972) is considered a masterpiece of Zaini's and portrays a girl sewing buttons on her brother's shirt while he wears a ghutra and agal, while she herself wears a bukhnuq. He continued in this vein with For Women Only (1979), adding literary, social, and psychological dimensions to his expressive approach.

=== Cubism works ===
Zaini's experience with Cubism dates back to a series of early artworks he produced as a student at the Academy of Fine Arts in Baghdad. An example is the painting The Hookah Smoker (1974), where he blended expressionism and cubism within a context that incorporates decorative elements and the human figure. In this painting, Zaini introduced geometric and decorative rhythms, using flattened ovals, semi-circles, triangles, and rectangles for the figure, while incorporating decorations in the background. Despite using a cubist style, the painting retained its expressive and realistic suggestions.

Zaini continued his exploration of Cubism, creating works that combine cubist elements with abstraction and composition, such as Fish Seller (1977), Medal of Arts (1984), and Generation Conflict (1987).

Zaini's use of Cubism was more expressive than symbolic. For instance, in his painting Fish Seller, he did not distort the proportions of forms as Picasso, who believed that every natural object could be reduced to basic geometric structures such as squares, rectangles, circles, prisms, or cubes. By contrast, Zaini's Fish Seller is built around the unity of the triangle and diamond shapes, with arching or circular rhythms in the background, maintaining harmony and balance between the figure and its surroundings. He did not abandon realism but expressed it through a cubist style, utilizing geometric shapes without distracting from the subject.

=== Abstract works ===
In the 1970s, Zaini also created abstract works featuring colorful areas and decorative calligraphic elements, such as Al-Hayir (1972), Modern Qatar (1973), Decoration (1974), and Remnants of Influence and Symmetry (1977). Despite the aesthetic nature of these works, Zaini's technique attempted to make them appear more meaningful through his choice of color, composition, and materials.
