= Yousef Ahmad =

Qatari artist (born 1955)

- Born: Yousef Ahmad Al-Homaid; January 1, 1955; Doha, Qatar
- Education: Helwan University, Cairo, Egypt
- Known for: Painting, Collecting, Educating, Advising
- Notable work: Popular Tailor (1973); Demolished Houses (1975); Nets Restorer (Djij) (1975); Local Coffee Shop (1988)
- Movement: Hurufiyya movement

Yousef Ahmad (Arabic: يوسف أحمد; born January 1, 1955, in Doha, Qatar) is a Qatari artist, art adviser, collector, writer and educator in the field of art. He is a leading figure of Qatar's cultural development and regularly represent his country at international biennials and events. His art work has been displayed internationally.

== Early life and education ==
Ahmad was born in Al Jasrah, a suburb of Doha, to a family of 3 sisters and 2 brothers. His mother was Maryam Al Baker, and his father, Ahmad Al-Homaid, worked as a pearl diver before joining Qatar Petroleum.

His neighborhood, Al Jasrah, was the hub of Qatari cultural life in the 1950s. It was home to significant families closely linked to the rulers and other tribes, and it became a meeting place for Ahmad and several other future artists, such as Jassim Zaini, Hassan Al Mulla, Ali Hassan, and Salman Al-Malik, among others. Their mutual passion for the arts led to the establishment of Qatar's first dedicated art groups.

By the time Ahmad finished primary school, the Ministry of Education began offering scholarships to Qatari artists to study abroad in Europe and the Middle East. He received a BA in Fine Art and Education from Helwan University in 1976. He studied under Gazbia Sirry during part of his tenure. He obtained a Master of Fine Arts degree from Mills College in California in 1982.

== Career as an artist ==
His works have been described as realistic, because they document the local Qatari environment and traditions of its people. He became active in creating unique abstract paintings of Arabic calligraphy, which he develops through his personal interpretation of Arabic script. Since 1974, he has used textiles in his art works. These are primarily old-fashioned fabrics, which he feels is representative of what his ancestors wore.

He is particularly known for producing large-scale works, using a wide range of colors and materials. Various natural landscapes, such as deserts, marshes and ponds, are usually the main subjects of his paintings. He states that such themes reflect on Al Jasrah, the neighborhood where he grew up. His choice of colors and materials is also representative of natural landscape, often incorporating the color of the desert as well as palm fronds into his works. In 1977, he became the first Qatari artist to have a solo exhibition dedicated to hurufiyya art in Doha.

He has been teaching art appreciation at Qatar University for more than twenty years. He also published a book, in 1986. It is called Al-Funoon at-Tashkeeliyyah al-Mu'aasirah fee Qatar (Contemporary Fine Arts in Qatar), and it documents pioneering artists, organizations and institutions at the time.

== Career in Qatari government ==
After his graduation, he was first appointed as manager of the Culture and Arts Department within the Ministry of Information.

While he was teaching at Qatar University, Ahmad met Sheikh Hassan bin Mohamed bin Ali Al Thani. He worked with him to collect significant works of Arab art from Qatar and abroad. This led to the creation of the Orientalist Museum and Mathaf: Arab Museum of Modern Art.

== Awards ==
- Baghdad International Festival for Arts

Winner: 1986

- Ankara Biennial

Referee's Award: 1986

- GCC Artists Exhibitions

Gold Palm-Leaf: 1989, 1991, 1996, 1999

- First Tourists Exhibition (Doha)

First prize: 1993

- Cairo Biennale

Referee's Award: 1996, 1998

- Al Kharafi First International Biennial of Contemporary Arab Art

Referee's Award: 2006

== See also ==
- Collecting practices of the Al-Thani Family
- Hurufiyya movement
- Islamic art
- Islamic calligraphy
