= Thomas Doherty =

Thomas Doherty may refer to:

- Thomas M. Doherty (1869–1906), American corporal in the Spanish–American War
- Tom Doherty (born 1935), American publisher
- Tommy Doherty (born 1979), Northern Ireland international footballer
- Thomas Doherty (actor) (born 1995), Scottish actor

== See also ==
- Thomas Docherty (disambiguation)
