= Thomas Docherty (academic) =

- Occupations: Emeritus Professor of English and of Comparative Literature

Academic background
- Education: University of Glasgow (MA) University of Oxford (MA; DPhil)

Academic work
- Institutions: University of Warwick

Thomas Docherty is Emeritus Professor of English and of Comparative Literature at the University of Warwick. A recognised authority on critical theory, literary theory and higher education, he is the author of seventeen books and a member of the Warwick Research Collective.

== Career ==
Docherty studied as an undergraduate at the University of Glasgow, followed by a Master's and Doctorate at the University of Oxford.

After teaching for five years at the University of Oxford, Docherty moved to University College Dublin and then, subsequently, took up the Chair of English (1867) at Trinity College Dublin. According to the writer Brian Dillon, whom Docherty taught during his time at Trinity College Dublin, Docherty came into conflict with more traditional Professors in the English Department, who were hostile to his theory-heavy approach to literature.

In 1995, Docherty took up Chair of English and Directorship of Research at the University of Kent. He subsequently moved to the University of Warwick in 2004, becoming the Head of the English Department in 2009.

A prominent critic of the Russell Group and of the marketisation of Higher Education in the United Kingdom, in 2014 Docherty made national headlines when he was suspended from his post by the University of Warwick and faced a discplinary tribunal for undermining the authority of the head of his department. Docherty was said to have 'sighed' and 'made "ironic" comments when interviewing job candidates'. He was subsequently cleared of all wrong doing and returned to full duties. The University denied that suspension and investigation were related to Docherty's political views on higher education.

== Awards and honours ==
In 2016 he was awarded an Honorary Degree by the University of Kent for his academic achievements and commitment to higher education.

== Bibliography ==
=== Books ===
- The Politics of Realism (2021)
- Political English (2019)
- Mood (co-edited with Brigit Breidenbach) (2019)
- Literature and Capital (2018)
- The New Treason of the Intellectuals (2018)
- Complicity: Criticism Between Collaboration and Commitment (2016)
- Universities at War (2014)
- Confessions: The Philosophy of Transparency (2012)
- For the University (2011)
- The English Question (2008)
- Aesthetic Democracy (2006)
- Criticism and Modernity (1999)
- Alterities (1996)
- Postmodernism (1993)
- After Theory (1990)
- On Modern Authority (1987)
- John Donne, Undone (1986)
