= Michael Darling (curator) =

- Occupation: James W. Alsdorf Chief Curator at the Museum of Contemporary Art, Chicago

Michael Darling (born 1967) was the James W. Alsdorf Chief Curator at the Museum of Contemporary Art, Chicago (MCA). Darling joined the MCA staff in July 2010 and left in 2021, to co-found the start-up Museum Exchange as chief growth officer.

== Life and education ==
Darling received his BA in art history from Stanford University, and he received his MA and PhD in art and architectural history from the University of California, Santa Barbara. Darling has worked as an independent writer and curator, contributing essays on art, architecture, and design to publications including Frieze, Art Issues, Flash Art, and LA Weekly. Darling frequently serves as a panelist, lecturer, and guest curator on contemporary art and architecture.

He is married and has two children.

== Career ==
Prior to joining the MCA, Darling was the Jon and Mary Shirley Curator of Modern and Contemporary Art at the Seattle Art Museum (SAM), where he was awarded SAM's Patterson Sims Fellowship for 2009-10. In 2008, Darling began the program SAM Next, a series of contemporary art exhibitions presenting emerging or underappreciated artists from around the globe. Artist Enrico David, who exhibited as part of SAM Next, has since been nominated for the Turner Prize.

Darling curated the SAM exhibitions Target Practice: Painting Under Attack 1949-78 (June 25 – September 7, 2009), and Kurt (May 13 – September 16, 2010). Target Practice showcased the attacks painting underwent in the years following World War II. Kurt explored Kurt Cobain’s influence on contemporary artists.

Darling was associate curator at the Museum of Contemporary Art, Los Angeles, before joining SAM. He co-curated The Architecture of R.M. Schindler (2001), which won the International Association of Art Critics “Best Architecture or Design Exhibition” award. The exhibition also won merit awards for interior architecture from the Southern California American Institute of Architects and the California Council of the American Institute of Architects.

=== MCA Vision ===
As reported by the Chicago Tribune in June 2011, Darling is focused on a “philosophical gut rehab [of the MCA] whose ultimate goal is clarity.” Included in the MCA renovations are the reassignment of gallery spaces and the hiring of new curatorial staff.

In 2011, Darling organized the exhibition Pandora’s Box: Joseph Cornell Unlocks the MCA Collection which ran June 18 – October 16, 2011, at the MCA Chicago. The exhibition placed pieces from the museum’s collection in direct dialogue with Joseph Cornell’s work.

Another organized exhibition Above, Before & After ran May 7, 2016–Jun 18, 2017 at the MCA Chicago. The artists featured in Above, Before & After manipulated form and space to explore the relationship between art and the viewer.

Darling was curator of Virgil Abloh exhibition "Figures of Speech" which was displayed at the MCA Chicago, the High Museum of Art in Atlanta, followed by the ICA Boston and the Fire Station Dohas Garage Gallery as part of the Qatar-United States 2021 Year of Culture.
