= Brian Dillon (writer) =

Irish writer (born 1969)

- Born: 1969 (age 56–57)
- Education: University College Dublin; Trinity College Dublin; University of Kent
- Occupation: Writer

Brian Dillon (born 1969) is an Irish essayist, memoirist and non-fiction writer.

His writing has won the Irish Book Award for non-fiction and has been shortlisted for the Ondaatje Prize and the Wellcome Book Prize.

He has written for The Guardian, The New York Times, London Review of Books, The New Yorker and Artforum.

== Biography ==
Dillon was born in Dublin. His mother died when he was 16 and his father when he was 21.

He attended University College Dublin as an undergraduate before pursuing a PhD at Trinity College Dublin under the supervision of Thomas Docherty. When Docherty moved to the University of Kent in 1995, Dillon also moved and completed his PhD in Canterbury.

After his PhD and still living in Kent, Dillon began writing non-fiction. During this time, he also taught literature and did not become a full time writer until 2003. After leaving Kent, he lived for a period on the Barbican Estate.

In 2013, he was the curator of an exhibition entitled "Curiosity: Art and the Pleasures of Knowing" at the Turner Contemporary in Margate. In 2014, he curated an exhibition called "Ruin Lust" at Tate Britain in London.

He currently resides in London.

== Bibliography ==
=== Books ===
- In the Dark Room (2005; republished 2017)
- Tormented Hope: Nine Hypochrondriac Lives (2010)
- Ruins (2011)
- Sanctuary (2011)
- I Am Sitting in a Room (2012)
- Objects in This Mirror: Essays (2014)
- The Great Explosion (2016)
- Essayism (2017)
- Suppose a Sentence (2020)
- Affinites (2023)
- Ambivalence (2026)
