= Hassan Al Mulla =

Qatari artist specializing in paintings (born 1951)

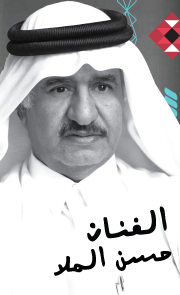
- Al Mulla in 2011
- Born: Hassan Al Mulla حســـن الملا; 1951 (age 74–75); Doha, Qatar
- Education: University of Baghdad, Baghdad, Iraq
- Known for: Painting

Hassan Al Mulla (Arabic: حســـن الملا; born 1951 in Doha, Qatar) is a Qatari artist specializing in paintings. He has been described as a "pioneer in painting in Qatar".

== Early life and education ==
Al Mulla was born in Qatar's capital city Doha in 1951. He had been painting since his childhood. He joined the University of Baghdad's College of Fine Arts in 1972, specializing in oil paintings. In 1975, he graduated with a BA in fine arts.

== Career ==
His paintings are surrealist. The most common themes in his paintings are childhood memories, traditional Qatari activities and the natural environment.

He was one of the eighteen founding members of the Qatari Fine Arts Society in 1980 and served as its second president. He is a former director of the Department of Culture and Arts. He taught painting at Qatar University. In 2011, he was the vice-president of the Qatar Society for Rehabilitation of People with Special Needs.

== Exhibitions ==
Al Mulla has participated in various regional and international art exhibitions. He participated in all of the Qatar Fine Arts' Society's exhibitions until 1995. His first solo exhibition was held in 1988. In 2013, he held his sixth solo exhibition.

Al Mulla had an exhibition in New Delhi in 2018 displaying 24 of his paintings. In 2020 the "Lived Forward: Art And Culture In Doha From 1960-2020" exhibition featured works from Al Mulla. In 2022 eight of his works were displayed in the Qatar collective art exhibition. He also participated in the Fire Station hosted exhibition "Abstraction: Subverting Reality".
