= Fire Station, Doha =

Museum in Doha, Qatar

Coordinates: 25.3025°N 51.5078°E

The Fire Station in Doha, Qatar, is a former base for the Qatari Civil Defense Authority repurposed for the Artists in Residence programme of the Qatar Museums. Khalifa Al Obaidli is the director and Saida Al Khulaifi is the head of programmes and exhibitions. On 4 April 2023, the Fire Station held its first public event for Garangao night which was open to people of all ages. In November 2024, Wael Shawky was appointed as the first artistic director of the Fire Station.

== Building ==
The building was constructed in 1982 and was used as a residence by the Civil Defense Authority of Qatar until 2012. The 2014 renovation, designed by the Qatari Architect Ibrahim Al Jaidah, retained many features of the building, like the honeycomb exterior or the firefighter pole. While the yellow fire engine doors were also conserved, they lost their original use as entry or exit ways after a wall was built on the inside of them to create additional space for artworks.

Outside of the gallery spaces, studios and workspaces the renovated building also contains a fabrication lab with a laser cutter, the Fire Station Cinema, a café called Café 999 and an art supply shop. An annex containing facilities for the public as well as the artists was also added to the complex.

The building was opened in March 2015 alongside the 555 exhibition, which ran until July.

== Residency programmes ==
The Artists in Residence (AIR) programme was launched in 2015 and selected Qatari and Qatari-based artists to take part in a 9-month long programme. The programme wants to give these artists a chance to collaborate and cooperate with other artist within the programme, work with professional artists, meet curators as well as provide mentoring session to help them develop their art. The 9th iteration of AIR began in September 2024 consisting of 15 artists and ended with the "Portals in Flux" exhibition held from October to December 2025.

In 2017 the Paris Art Residency in the Cite Internationale des Art in Paris was started. The artists stayed in the complex for three months while working on their art and exploring the Parisian art scene. A year later a residency at the Studio 209 NY in New York was announced, starting with the two artist Fatima Mohammed and Sarah Al Oabidli in January 2019.

A Curatorial Residency was established in 2020. The curators are selected through an open call and provided with a workspace in the Fire Station as well as access to sessions with local curators and artists, Open Studio events and public programmes.

In January 2024, the AIR announced the start of the 2024 "Ruwad in Residency" programme which includes artists Haifa Alkhuzaei and Ahmed Al Hamar. The programme was initially launched in 2021 to support established local artists. In 2025, the Artists Intensive Study Programme, a nine-month curriculum incorporating studio and practice-based work among other, was launched.

== Exhibitions and events ==
In 2018 the Fire Station hosted the first edition of the Qatar International Art Festival, which showcased artworks of 147 artists from 58 countries.

Exhibitions at the Fire Station include:

- "Picasso-Giacometti", February 2017 to May 2017.
- "German Encounters: Contemporary Masterworks", October 2017 to January 2018.
- "Ai Weiwei: Laundromat", March 2018 to June 2018.
- "Russian Seasons", October 2018 to October 2018.
- "Russian Avant-garde: Pioneers and Direct Descendants", December 2018 to February 2019.
- "Kazimir Malevich: Genius of the Russian Avant-garde", March 2019 to May 2019.
- "KAWS: HE EATS ALONE", October 2019 to January 2020.
- "Olga Stefatou: Chrysalis", February 2020.
- "Picasso's Studios", July 2020 to November 2020.
- "Sabrina Puppin: Enclosed Realities", November 2020.
- "Grey Times", January 2021 to August 2021.
- "James She: Keep Running: AI", March 2021 to April 2021.
- "Mohammed Al Atiq: Attention", March 2021 to April 2021.
- "Haitham Al Hamad: Selective", August 2021 to September 2021.
- "Virgil Abloh: Figures of Speech", curated by Michael Darling, November 2021 to March 2022.
- "Nasser al-Thani: Esspresso 4 the Road", May 2022 to July 2022.
- "Yousef Bahzad: Earth Metal", May 2022 to July 2022.
- "Abeer Al-Tamimi: Beyond the Rules", July 2022 to September 2022.
- "Abstraction: Subverting Reality", July 2022 to September 2022.
- "Birthday Ceremony", February 2023 to March 2023.
- "Experience Al Jazeera", November 2022 to March 2023.
- "Anfal Alkandari: Picnic ’88", March 2023 to May 2023.
- "Curator in Residence 2023", March 2023 to May 2023.
- "Eduardo Navarro: Free Spirits of Wild Horses", Fire Station May 2023 to June 2023.
- "The Present: The Future of the Past", August 2023 to December 2023.
- "Electric Idyll", February 2024 to June 2024.
- "Etheralscape", June 2024 to August 2024.
- "Neighbours of the Sea", June 2024 to August 2024.
- "AIR 8: A House Overlooking the World", from September 2024 to December 2024.
- "Friends & More", from November 2024 to December 2024.
- "The Voyager is the Narrator II", February 2025 to March 2025.
- "As I Lay Between Two Seas", April 2025 to June 2025.
- "Printed Nostalgia", curated by Saida Alkhulaifi and Fatima Alzaini, July 2025 to September 2025.
- "Haifa Al Khuzaie: Threads of Memory", September 2025 to October 2025.
- "Ahmed Al Hamar: Between Rust and Art", September 2025 to October 2025.
- "Fatma Al Naimi: And Then, A Return", November 2025 to December 2025.
- "Aissa Deebi: What Remains to Be Seen", November 2025 to December 2025.
- "Chung Seoyoung: Endless Facts", February 2026 to April 2026.
- "Ho Tzu Nyen: Hotel Aporia", February 2026 to May 2026.
- "Haroon Mirza: Everything Was, Is and Always Will Be", February 2026 to May 2026.
- "Lines of Belonging", June 2026 to August 2026.

== See also ==
- List of museums in Qatar
