= Arida =

Arida may refer to:

- Arida (plant), a genus of plants in the family Asteraceae
- Arida, Lebanon, a village in Lebanon
- Arida, Wakayama, a city in Japan
- Arida District, Wakayama, a district in Japan

== People ==
- Anthony Peter Arida (1863–1955), Maronite patriarch of Antioch
- Ariella Arida (born 1988), Filipino actress
- May Arida (1926–2018), Lebanese socialite
- Nasib Arida (1887–1946), Syrian-born American poet and writer
- Pérsio Arida (born 1952), Brazilian economist
- Zeina Arida (born 1970), Lebanese museum executive
