= Arida (surname) =

Arida is a surname. Notable people with the surname are as follows:

- Anthony Peter Arida (1863–1955), Maronite patriarch of Antioch
- Ariella Arida (born 1988), Filipino actress
- May Arida (1926–2018), Lebanese socialite
- Nasib Arida (1887–1946), Syrian-born American poet and writer
- Pérsio Arida (born 1952), Brazilian economist
- Zeina Arida (born 1970), Lebanese museum executive
