= Sophia Al Maria =

Qatari-American artist, writer, and filmmaker

- Born: 1983 (age 42–43); Tacoma, Washington, US
- Occupations: Artist, writer, filmmaker
- Years active: 2008-
- Known for: the term 'Gulf Futurism'

Sophia Al Maria (Arabic: صافية المرية; born 1983) is an artist, writer, and filmmaker. Her work has been exhibited at the Gwangju Biennale, the New Museum and Whitney Museum of American Art in New York, the Venice Biennale and the Tate Britain in London. Her writing has appeared in Harper's Magazine, Five Dials, Triple Canopy, and she is a contributing editor at Bidoun.

She has coined and developed the concept of 'Gulf Futurism', which is intended to capture the amalgamation of Western cultural influences and rapid modernization in the Arab states of the Persian Gulf.

Her memoir The Girl Who Fell To Earth was published by Harper Perennial on November 27, 2012.

== Early life ==
Sophia Al Maria was born to an American mother from Puyallup, Washington and a Qatari father. She spent time in both countries during her childhood. She studied comparative literature at the American University in Cairo, and aural and visual cultures at Goldsmiths, University of London. She then relocated to Qatar, where she worked towards opening the Mathaf contemporary art museum, alongside the curators Wassan Al-Khudhairi and Deena Chalabi. Al Maria cites the experience as being formative, where she was "tasked with meeting and interviewing artists like Hassan Sharif or Zineb Sedira—that was my real art education. Having that proximity was, in a weird way, how I got into artmaking."

== Career ==
Al Maria was awarded the Most Promising Filmmaker Award at the 2009 Doha Tribeca Film Festival.

Her memoir The Girl Who Fell to Earth (2012) is the first English-language memoir to be written by a Qatari author. The Girl Who Fell to Earth documents her upbringing between her "redneck family in Washington State" and her Bedouin family in Qatar.

In 2014, a film being developed by Al Maria called Beretta was shelved due to legal reasons. The story revolved around an Egyptian lingerie salesman going on a murder spree in which all of his targets are male, bearing similarities to the 1976 film Taxi Driver. She would write a novel, Virgin with a Memory (2014), partially based on Beretta. It was announced in 2024 that producers Uri Singer and Aimee Peyronnet had purchased the rights to Beretta from Al Maria.

Al Maria has written several films, including The Watcher #1 (2014), The Magical Slate (2017) and Mirror Cookie (2018).

In 2020, Al Maria produced and cowrote the British miniseries Little Bird. The show aired on Sky Atlantic and received generally positive reviews.

She adapted a biography written by Jean-Noël Liaut about the fashion model and WWII secret agent Toto Koopman for a documentary movie script. Finite Films & TV and Shoni Productions will produce the biographical film.

=== Gulf Futurism ===
In the late-2000s, Al Maria coined the term 'Gulf Futurism' in reference to the rapid modernization of Persian Gulf cities like Dubai and Doha following the discovery of oil. The term is intended to capture modernizing events such as the construction boom of upscale hotels, malls, and megaprojects, as well as the assimilation of Bedouin tribes into an international consumer culture.

The concept of Gulf Futurism is rooted in the precept that many of the futuristic and cyberpunk aspects of historical Western literature can be observed in the Persian Gulf states in present-day.

Consumer culture is a dominant aspect of Gulf Futurism, with the presence of modernistic shopping malls and popularity of non-traditional entertainment mediums such as television and video games being at the forefront.

The prevalence of shopping malls is a primary theme, providing multifunctional spaces to locals, from socializing, to exercising, to serving as covert meet-up spots. Her exhibit Black Friday at the Whitney Museum in 2016 portrayed Qatar's malls as places where consumers overwhelmingly feel out of place or entrapped, in an attempt to emphasize the consequences of rapid urbanization.
