= Mübin Orhon =

Turkish painter (1924–1981)

- Born: 1924; Istanbul, Turkey
- Died: 1981 (aged 56–57)
- Occupation: Painter

Mübin Orhon (1924–1981) was a Turkish abstract painter. Collectors have included the Sainsbury family, founders of the supermarket chain Sainsbury's, who gifted his artwork to the Sainsbury Centre for Visual Arts in Norwich, England. Three of his paintings are also in the permanent collection of Mathaf: Arab Museum of Modern Art in Doha, Qatar.
