= Collecting practices of the Al-Thani Family =

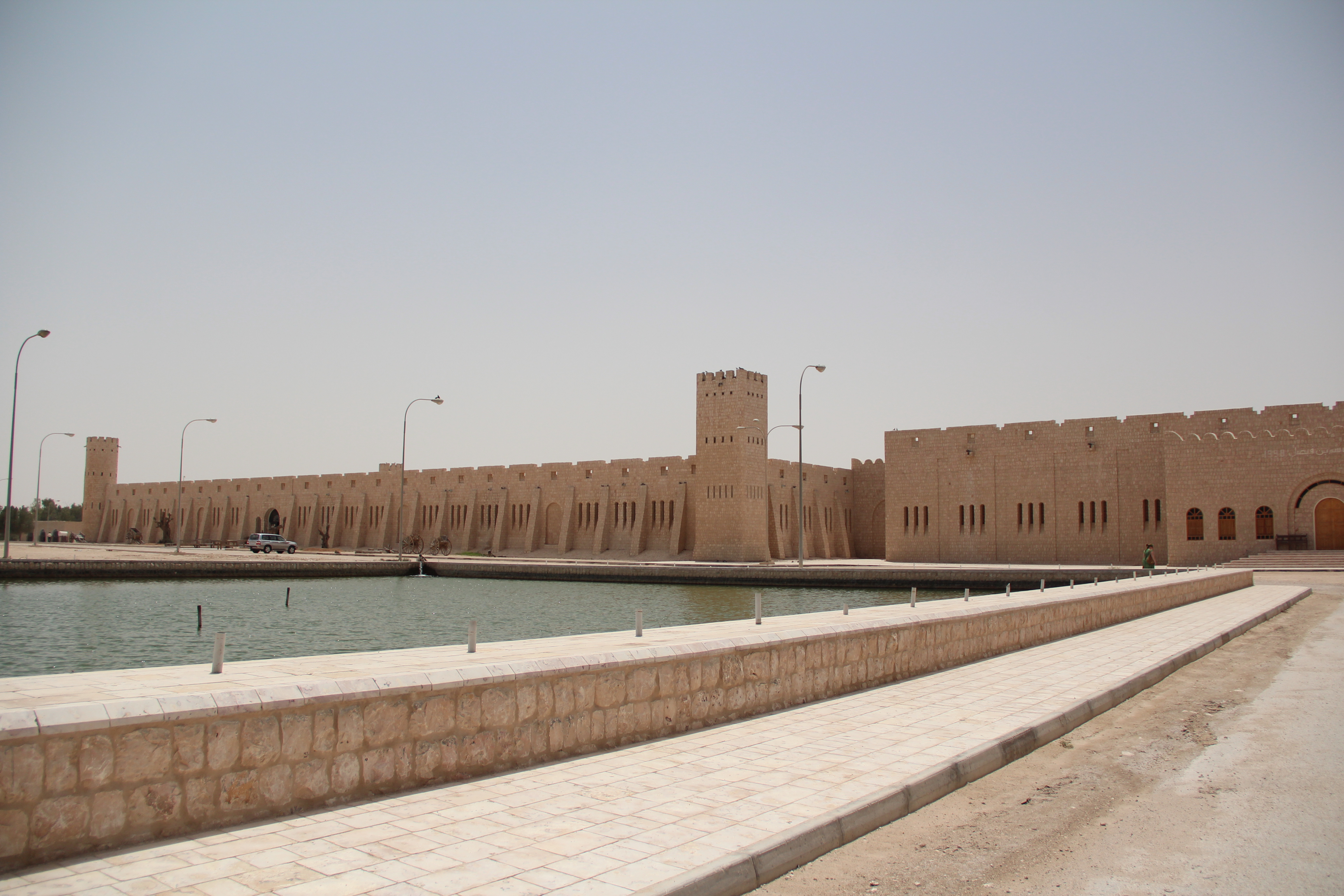
Entrance to the Sheikh Faisal Bin Qassim Al Thani Museum.

The House of Thani is the ruling family of Qatar. Since the early 2000s, the family has led the development of the country’s cultural and artistic institutions. Their initiatives, including the establishment of new museums and universities, coincide with Qatar National Vision 2030, a government plan that aims to transition the country towards a "knowledge-based economy" in Qatar by 2030.

Qatar’s cultural policy, shaped under the Al Thani family, has focused on establishing museums, art collections, and educational programs designed to support the country’s transition toward a knowledge-based economy. This approach differs from the international franchise model used in neighboring Abu Dhabi, where branches of major Western museums have been established.

== Collecting strategy of the Al-Thani family ==
=== Key figures ===
Members of the Al Thani family have been central to Qatar’s involvement in art collecting and museum development.

- Hassan bin Mohamed bin Ali Al Thani owns one of the largest collections of modern Arab art, numbering over 6,000 works. His collection, developed since the 1980s, became the foundation of the Mathaf Museum in Doha.
- Saud bin Muhammed Al Thani assembled a major collection of Islamic manuscripts, carpets, instruments, and jewelry, contributing to the creation of the Museum of Islamic Art and other national collections.
- Al-Mayassa bint Hamad bin Al Thani heads the Qatar Museums Authority (QMA), responsible for overseeing national museums and exhibitions, although she "did not study art history". She has appeared in international rankings such as Forbes and Art+Auction due to her leadership of Qatar’s museum network and its acquisition strategy.

=== Role in the art market ===
Qatar became a major buyer in the international art market in the 2000s and 2010s. In 2011, The Art Newspaper identified Qatar as the world’s leading purchaser of contemporary art. According to market analysts, the country often paid premium prices for high-profile artworks, positioning Doha as a regional art hub.

=== Large financial resources ===
The royal family and Qatar's cultural institution are subscribed to the databank on art prices and indices Artprice Group. A study conducted by Artprice and Organ Museum Research over the period 2000–2012 revealed that Qatar bid for artworks with a margin of 40 to 45% above "market prices". Forbes estimates that the annual budget for the sole Qatar Museum Authority is about $250 million.

The chief executive of the Fine Art Fund Group, an art investment management and consulting firm based in London, estimates that Qatari buyers make up 25% of the Middle East's $11 billion art market.

== Al-Thani's art collection: overview ==
Audubon, Snowy Owl

The Al Thani family’s collections encompass traditional Islamic art, Western modern art, and Arab contemporary art.

=== Islamic and antique collections ===
The family’s holdings include Islamic manuscripts, textiles, scientific instruments, and decorative objects from across the Middle East, North Africa, and Asia. Notable items include a complete edition of John James Audubon’s Birds of America and examples of Persian miniatures and Mughal jewelry.

=== Western art ===
The Al Thani collection includes modern and contemporary works by artists such as Mark Rothko, Francis Bacon, Jeff Koons, and Damien Hirst. Among the most well-known pieces is Paul Cézanne’s The Card Players, acquired for the national collection in the 2010s.

=== Middle Eastern and North African art ===
The Al-Thani family collects and creates Arab contemporary art, while also supporting regional artists. Sheikh Hassan bin Mohamed bin Ali Al Thani began purchasing Arab art in the mid-1980s and collaborated with artist and art educator Yousef Ahmad in 1986.

Hassan Al-Thani supported Iraqi artists after the Iraqi invasion of Kuwait and the first Gulf War and owns an extensive collection of art pieces by well-known Iraqi artists Ismail Fatah Al Turk and Shakir Hassan Al Said. His collection of Iraqi art is known as the biggest in the world. The exhibition for the opening of Mathaf in December 2010 featured art pieces by several Arab artists, including French artists of Algerian origin Kader Attia and Zineb Sedira, Iraqi Adel Abidin, Palestinian Khalil Rabah, Moroccans Farid Belkahia and Mounir Fatmi, Egyptians Ahmed Nouar and Ghada Amer, and Lebanese Walid Raad.

=== Photography ===
In 2000, Saud Al-Thani notably bought 136 vintage photographs, including pieces by Alfred Stieglitz and Man Ray, and a black and white photograph by Joseph-Philibert Girault de Prangey in 2003 for £565,250, which set a new world record at the time.

== Al-Thani's collection displayed: museums and exhibitions ==
Qatar has constructed several museums and sponsored exhibitions to house and display his collections of work. This development is part of Qatar's strategy to become more recognized culturally.

=== Museums ===
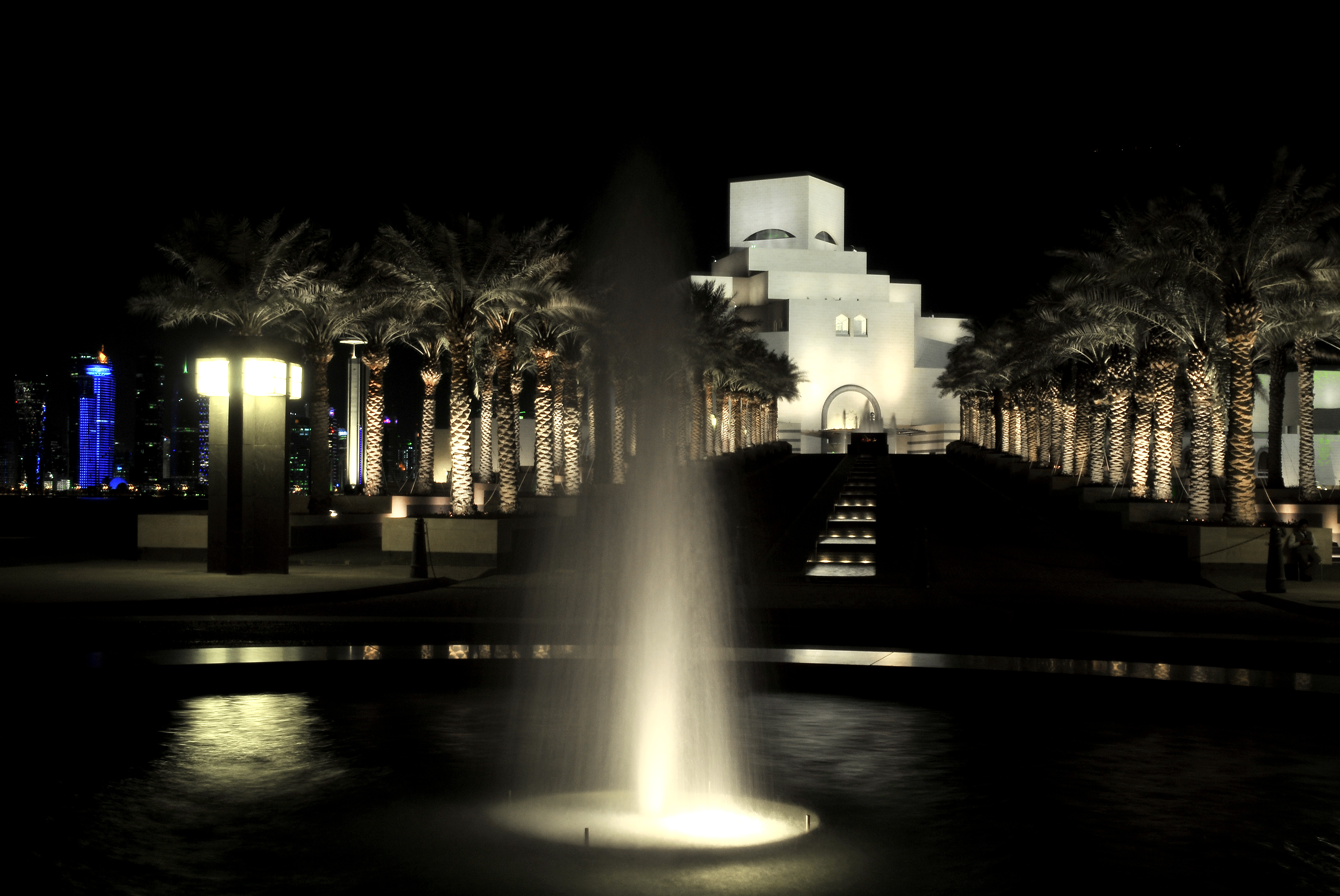
Museum of Islamic Art, Doha, designed by I.M. Pei

==== Qatar Museums Authority ====
Established in 2005, the Qatar Museums Authority coordinates the country’s museum projects and cultural programs. According to The Economist, the agency plays a key role in shaping national cultural policy while remaining closely connected to the royal family’s initiatives.

==== Museum of Islamic Art ====
The Museum of Islamic Art opened in 2008, designed by architect I. M. Pei. An adjoining public space, MIA Park, opened in 2011 and includes Richard Serra’s sculpture 7.

==== Mathaf ====
Mathaf: Arab Museum of Modern Art opened in December 2010. The museum focuses on modern and contemporary Arab art and aims to increase the visibility of regional artists. Its founder, Hassan bin Mohamed bin Ali Al Thani, described it as a way to preserve and display Arab artistic heritage.

==== National Museum of Qatar ====
The National Museum of Qatar opened in 2019, designed by French architect Jean Nouvel. It presents the natural and cultural history of the country, from prehistoric times to the present. The museum features an array of archaeological and heritage objects, manuscripts, documents, photographs and jewelry.

==== Sheikh Faisal Bin Qassim Museum ====
Founded in 1998 by Faisal bin Qassim Al Thani, the Sheikh Faisal Bin Qassim Al Thani Museum houses more than 15,000 artifacts representing Qatari heritage and international history.

==== Exhibitions and events ====
In addition to building museums, the Al Thani family and Qatar Museums have sponsored international and regional exhibitions, including:

- Murakami-Ego (2012), by Takashi Murakami, presented in Doha as part of the Qatar–Japan 2012 cultural exchange.
- Conscious and Unconscious (2012), a retrospective of Louise Bourgeois organized by Qatar Museums Authority.
- The Al Thani Award for Photography, established in 2001, which expanded from a local event to an international photography competition by 2006.

== See also ==
- Hassan bin Mohamed bin Ali Al Thani
- Al-Mayassa bint Hamad bin Khalifa Al-Thani
- Mathaf
- Qatar Museums Authority

== Sources ==
- "Art and the Middle East: Qatar's culture Queen", The Economist, 31 March 2012
- Georgina Adam and Charlotte Burns, "Qatar revealed as the world's biggest contemporary art buyer", The Art Newspaper, 7 July 2011
- Robert Kluijver, "Introduction to the Gulf Art World"
- Christian Chesnot, Georges Malbrunot, Qatar: les clés du coffre-fort, Michel Lafont, March 2013
