= Al-Khudhairi =

Al-Khudhairi is a surname. Notable people with the surname include:

- Wassan Al-Khudhairi, American art curator
- Yasmin Al-Khudhairi, English actress
