= Leucosyris mattturneri =

Conservation status
- Critically Imperiled (NatureServe)

Scientific classification
- Kingdom: Plantae
- Clade: Tracheophytes
- Clade: Angiosperms
- Clade: Eudicots
- Clade: Asterids
- Order: Asterales
- Family: Asteraceae
- Genus: Leucosyris
- Species: L. mattturneri

Binomial name
- Leucosyris mattturneri (B.LTurner & G.Nesom) Pruski & R.L.Hartm.
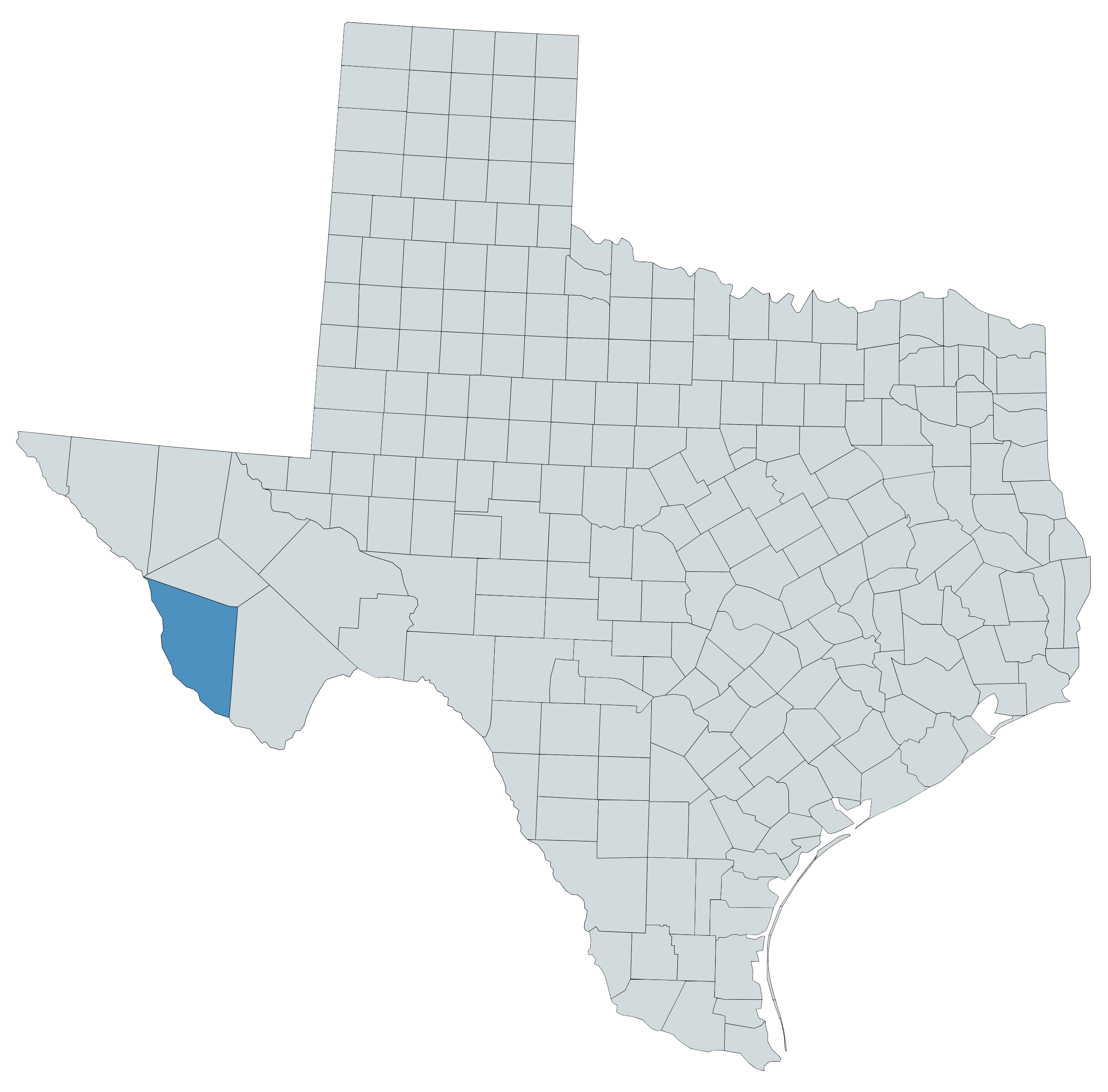
- Range of Leucosyris mattturneri in Texas

Synonyms
- Arida mattturneri B.LTurner & G.Nesom

Species of flowering plant

Leucosyris mattturneri, also known as Matt Turner's aster, is an endangered species of flowering plant endemic to Presidio County, Texas.
