= Dar Al Kutub Al Qatariyya =

Library in Doha, Qatar

Coordinates: 25.2826°N 51.5403°E

Dar Al Kutub Al Qatariyya (Arabic: دار الكتب القطرية, romanized: Dār al-Kutub al-Qatarīyyah) is a library in Doha, Qatar that served as the national library until the opening of the Qatar National Library in 2012. It was founded on 29 December 1962 and is considered among the earliest public libraries in the Persian Gulf region.

When Qatar National Library opened, library visits were "not yet a part of the culture in Qatar – the old Dar Al Kutub... not [being] used very much" and still "in the dawn of the digital age".

== History ==
Dar Al Kutub Al Qatariyya was officially established in 1962 by Qatar's fourth emir, Sheikh Ali bin Abdullah Al Thani. The name literally means "Qatari house of books". The library resulted from the amalgamation of the Dar Al Ma'rifa, also known as the Public Knowledge Library under the Ministry of Education, and the Doha Public Library, which was formed in 1956. These libraries were the oldest public libraries in the Arab States of the Persian Gulf. Inspiration was drawn from the Egyptian National Library and Archives, the first public library in the MENA region. The library established the Doha International Book Fair in 1972.

Upon its establishment, the library building, located on Grand Hamad Street, was only one-story but expanded to two stories in 1982. As part of this expansion, a conservation laboratory and a section dedicated to binding periodicals were also built. The Ministry of Education managed the library from its inception until nearly 30 years later, when the Ministry of Communication assumed control. In 1998, supervision was reassigned to the National Council for Culture, Arts, Literature and Heritage.

In 1982, Dar Al Kutub was officially designated as a national library through Emiri decree no. 14, which established a legal deposit procedure for Qatari publications to be managed by the institution. The library was visited by residents all over Qatar until the opening of additional public libraries, which amounted to 24 by 1990.

Due to its small size, in 2002 the Qatari government drew up plans to establish a new library on the Doha Corniche next to the Post Office, though these plans were abandoned in 2008. Following these plans, Sheikha Moza bint Nasser announced a new project for a national library in Education City in 2012, resulting in the library being replaced by the Qatar National Library which opened in late 2017. In 2012, Dar Al Kutub boasted a membership of over 16,000 members and a collection that included 281,000 Arabic books, 38,098 English books, 1,163 Arabic periodicals, 266 English periodicals, 865 theses in both Arabic and English by Qatari students, 533 microfiches, 2,018 manuscripts, and 154 CDs.

=== Renovations ===
Following its replacement as the national library of Qatar, it was planned for Dar Al Kutub be demolished, though on the recommendation of Qatar Foundation, it was instead repurposed as a library museum. The library was closed in 2020 and underwent renovations. It was planned as a tourist attraction for the 2022 FIFA World Cup, but was only completed in 2025.
