= Baghdad High School for Girls =

Coordinates: 33.3080°N 44.3449°E

- Baghdad; Iraq

Information
- Established: 1925

Baghdad High School for Girls (Arabic: إعدادية بغداد للبنات) is a girls' school in Mansour, Baghdad, Iraq.

== Characteristics of the school ==
In 2004, a reporter visiting the school said that most of the girls attending were daughters of government officials and wealthy, prominent people. The reporter said that fewer than half of the girls at the school wore hijabs and that the school was like an Iraqi equivalent of Vogue and "Beverly Hills High 90210". She noted that 98% of pupils continue to university, mostly to study medicine, engineering, science and technology.

== Notable former pupils ==
- Nada Shabout, art historian
