= Bouthayna Al Muftah =

Qatari artist

Bouthayna Al-Muftah (born 1987) is a Qatari artist, best known for her work in printmaking and drawing. Her works are characterized by the frequent use of black ink, which she integrates into nearly all of her creations.

== Early life and education ==
Al-Muftah was born in Qatar in 1987. She holds a Bachelor of Arts from Virginia Commonwealth University School of the Arts in Qatar (2010).

== Career and work ==
After graduating from VCUarts, Al Muftah specialized in printmaking, typography and drawing. She created several mixed media installations.

In 2014, her works were included in a group exhibition at the Qatar Museums Gallery - Al Riwaq exhibition Here, There under the title Um Alsalsil Will Thahab, which means "Mother of Chains and Gold".

On 30 April 2017, Al Muftah created a series to archive the history of her people. She did this by merging shape, color, and texture to visually document the state of desire in all images of her series Yeebhom' ('Bring them back'). Al Muftah's work was the focus of the collective exhibition "Currents", which opened at W Doha's Art 29 and was received by art collectors and lovers from around the country.

In 2017, her art works featured at "Contemporary Art Qatar" in Berlin.

In 2018, she presented her art exhibition Bouthayna Al-Muftah: Echoes at Mathaf: Arab Museum of Modern Art.

On 28 November 2019, Al Muftah was schowcased in the exhibition "40 Minus Volume 7 Part 2". The exhibition focuses on Al Muftah as well as artist Mubarak Nasser Al Thani. Using various media and styles, they created works which touched on the idea of the effects of internet and social media on the society.

On 27 January 2020, she along with many other artists, also showcased her work in the Qatar Museums spring show "Lived Forward: Art and Culture in Doha from 1960-2020" was part of the series titled Focus: Works from Mathaf Collection.

In July 2020, The 'Our World Is Burning' exhibition reopened. Al Muftah was among the 30 contemporary artists from the region whose works was being showcased at the exhibition at Palais de Tokyo, the biggest contemporary art museum in Europe.

In September 2021, Al Muftah's artwork was auctioned at the AlBahie Auction House along with other VCU Qatar alumni. Al Muftah's painting from the Lawha Lil Dawhah series sold for $28,000.

Sheikha Al Mayassa was briefed by Al Muftah on her solo exhibition Anassir, which opened in November 2022 at M7.

On 15 June 2022, the Cité international de la Tapisserie in Aubusson held a ceremony to unveil the tapestry 'bring them back', inspired by the works of Al Muftah.

Bouthayna is the official poster artist for the 2022 FIFA World Cup. In June 2022, she unveiled her poster at Hamad International Airport in Doha. A total of eight posters are produced to represent Qatar's passion for soccer. The main poster shows a traditional Qatari headdress ghutra being thrown in the air, as a symbol of the celebrations and soccer enthusiasm in the Arab world.

In July 2022, she unveiled her poster at the Design Museum in London as part of the exhibition "Football: Designing the Beautiful Game". Also present at the unveiling was the official ambassador of the 2022 FIFA World Cup Qatar, David Beckham.

On 18 July 2022, Fashion Trust Arabia announced that, among other artists, Al Muftah would collaborate with designer Yasmin Mansour to create and promote sustainable fashion.
