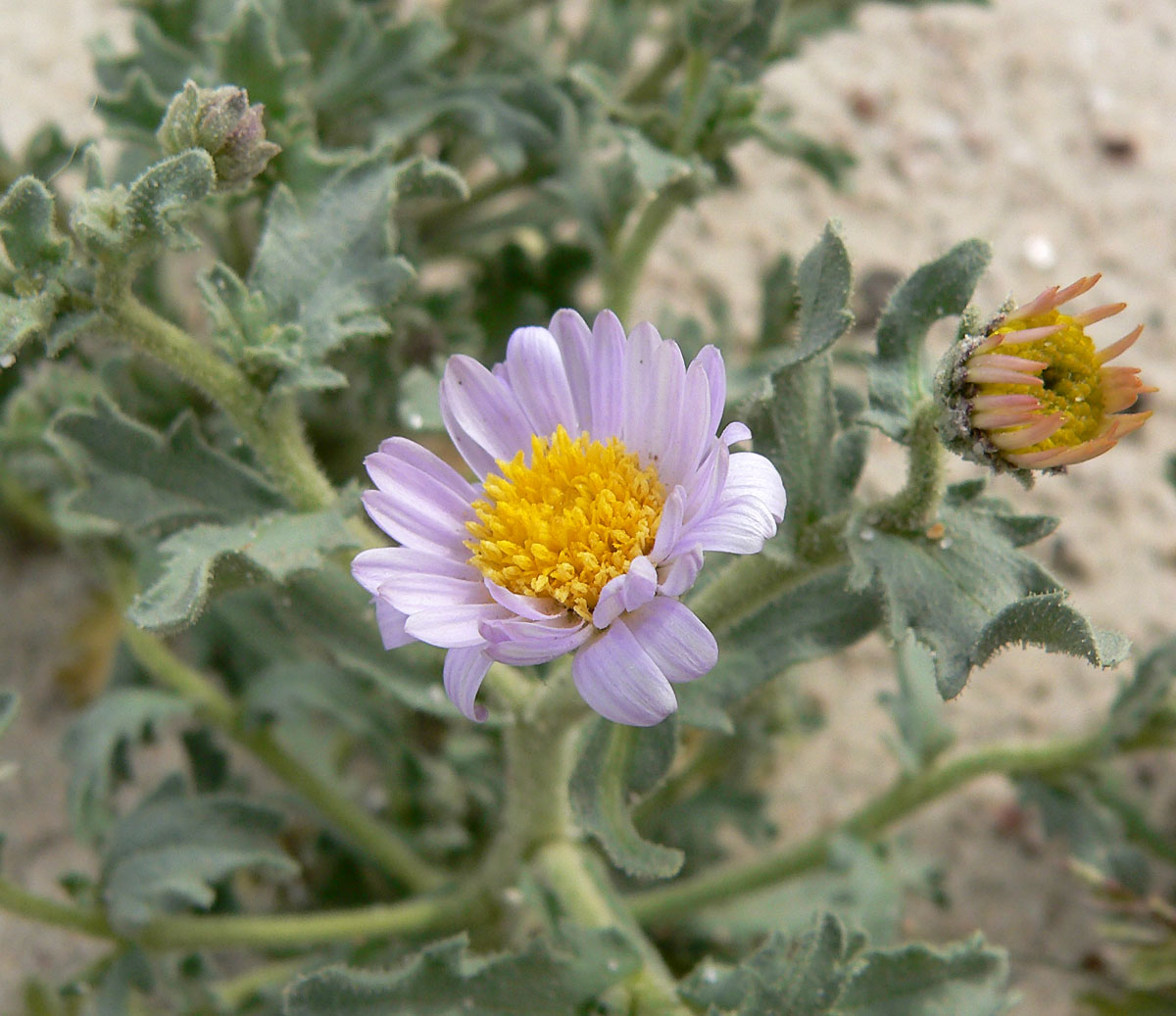

Scientific classification
- Kingdom: Plantae
- Clade: Tracheophytes
- Clade: Angiosperms
- Clade: Eudicots
- Clade: Asterids
- Order: Asterales
- Family: Asteraceae
- Genus: Leucosyris
- Species: L. arida

Binomial name
- Leucosyris arida (B.L.Turner & D.B.Horne) Pruski & R.L.Hartm.

Synonyms
- Arida arizonica (R.C.Jacks. & R.R.Johnson) D.R.Morgan & R.L.Hartm.; Machaeranthera ammophila Reveal; Machaeranthera arida B.L.Turner & D.B.Horne; Machaeranthera arizonica R.C.Jacks. & R.R.Johnson; Machaeranthera coulteri var. arida (B.L.Turner & D.B.Horne) B.L.Turner

= Leucosyris arida =

Species of flowering plant

Leucosyris arida is an annual plant in the family Asteraceae, known by the common names arid tansyaster, desert tansyaster, and Silver Lake daisy. It is native to the very arid deserts of northern Mexico and the southwestern United States, and usually looks straggly and not very attractive. But in years with very heavy rainfall, it fills out and becomes rounded and bush like.

Leucosyris arida is widespread throughout its desert habitat in Arizona, Nevada, California and Sonora, including disturbed areas such as roadsides. It can be found in very arid, open sandy and salty soils, up to 3,000'. It grows in creosote bush scrub, alkali sink, and desert dry wash areas in the central and eastern Mojave Desert from Barstow, California to Arizona and Sonora, Mexico.

== Description ==
Leucosyris arida is an annual herb with a branching stem reaching up to 30 centimeters (12 inches) tall. The oblong leaves are up to 3 centimeters long, edged with bristly teeth, and sometimes divided into lobes. The herbage is coated with glandular rough hairs. The inflorescence bears one or more flower heads lined with glandular phyllaries. The head has a center of many yellow disc florets and a fringe of 25-35 lavender or white ray florets each a few millimeters long. The fruit is a hairy achene between 1 and 2 millimeters long. Fruits from the disc florets generally have pappi.

It flowers between March and June.
