= Qatar National Library =

Located in Education City

- مكتبة قطر الوطنية

- Qatar National Library in Education City in 2016
- 25.3182597°N 51.4412944°E
- Location: Ar Rayyan, Qatar
- Established: November 19, 2012
- Architect: Rem Koolhaas

Other information
- Parent organization: Qatar Foundation for Education, Science and Community Development
- Public transit access: Qatar National Library station (Doha Metro)
- Website: qnl.qa

Qatar National Library (QNL) is a non-profit organization under the umbrella of Qatar Foundation. The plans for the new national library were announced by Sheikha Moza bint Nasser, chairperson of Qatar Foundation, on 19 November 2012, during a ceremony celebrating the 50th anniversary of the Dar Al Kutub Al Qatariyya, in Doha, Qatar, one of the first public libraries in the Persian Gulf region (founded on 29 December 1962), which had until then been regarded as the national library of Qatar.

QNL aims to serve a three-fold function: as a national library, a research-level university library, and a central metropolitan public library equipped for the digital age. In its capacity as a national library as defined by UNESCO, it collects and provides access to global knowledge, including heritage content and materials relevant to Qatar and the region; as a university and research library, it supports education and research at all levels; and as a modern central public library, it provides library services and resources to meet the reading interests and foster the information literacy of the general public. In addition, with the opening of the new building, it also serves as a community meeting place. The building was designed by Dutch architect Rem Koolhaas of OMA and opened in April 2018 alongside events, seminars and exhibitions.

Claudia Lux, a German scholar and library professional, was appointed by the Qatar Foundation to be the director of the library project in April 2012, and initially oversaw the launch of QNL as a digital library. Meanwhile, construction began on a new building for the library in Education City, a district in Doha that was developed by Qatar Foundation as a center of higher education, and now includes branch campuses of six American universities, as well as other educational and research institutions.

In October 2016, Dr. Sohair Wastawy was appointed as Executive Director of QNL, to which she brought 30 years of library managerial experience. In September 2021, Tan Huism became Executive Director of the library.

In 2020, the QNL joined the Global Sustainability Coalition for Open Sciences Services (SCOSS). During the COVID-19 pandemic the QNL was closed to the public, but reopened in July 2020. In 2022, 296,456 books were checked out in the library, which was 113,313 more than in 2021. An app allowing visitors to access various resources of the library was introduced in 2023. In 2025, the QNL funded 1,423 open access articles and digitised 767,000 pages.

In December 2024, the QNL became host for the International Federation of Library Associations regional office for the MENA region. In August 2026, the QNL signed a Memorandum of Understanding with the National Library of Nigeria for research, technology, cultural heritage, knowledge exchange and professional development.

== Library collections and services ==
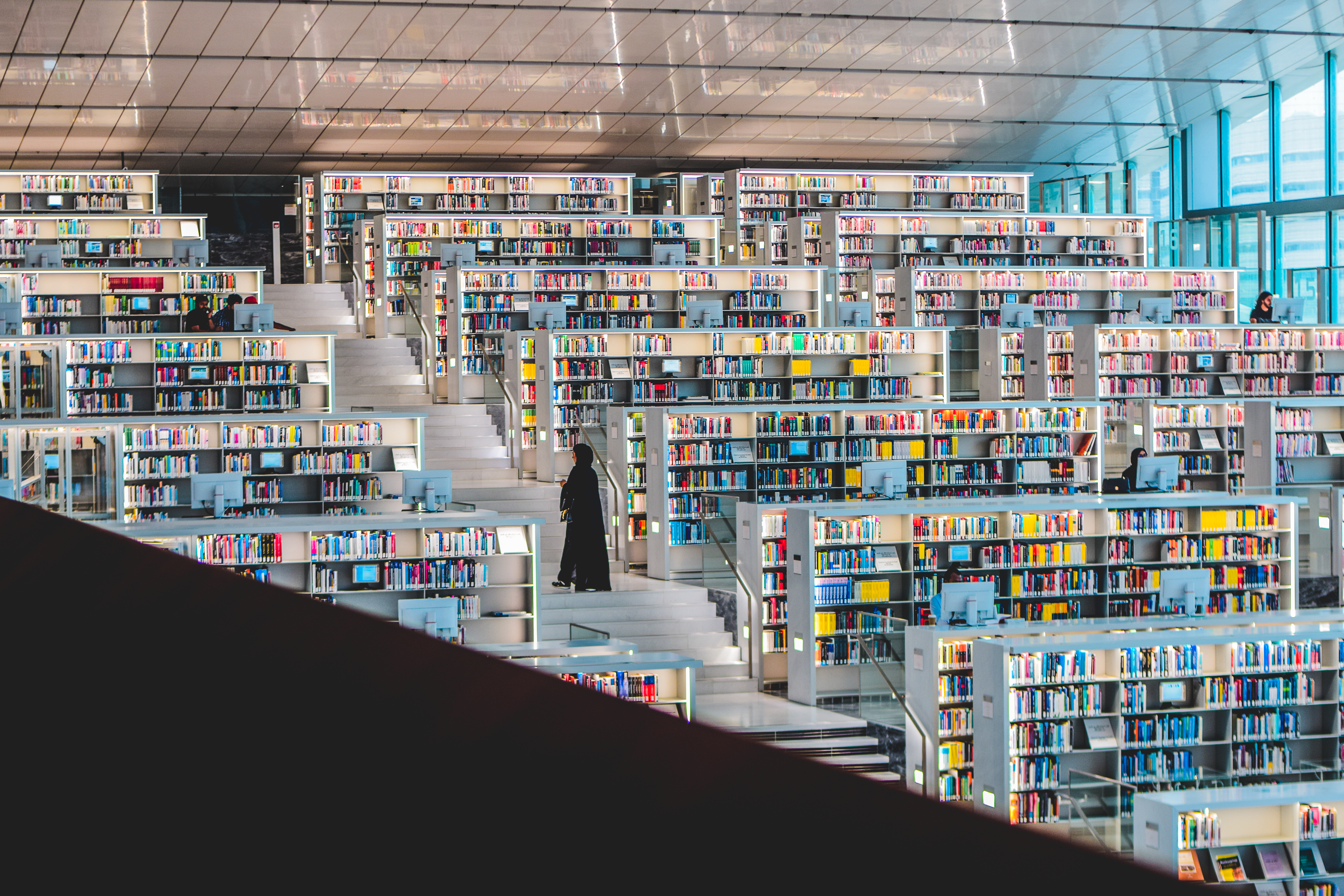
Qatar National Library collections

Any Qatari citizen or resident permit holder is eligible for free library registration. QNL's website offers registered library users free online access to a diverse collection of online resources, including international scholarly databases and top academic journals, as well as popular literature, magazines, children's resources, and music.

The library offers a wide variety of books and e-books, in English, Arabic, and other languages, including fiction and non-fiction, bestsellers and classics, as well as magazines and journals, DVDs, CDs, and audiobooks. In 2018, the library's collection consisted of more than 800,000 books on its shelves and more than 500,000 eBooks, periodicals and newspapers, and special collections. In keeping with QNL's mission to help prepare Qatar residents for participation in the global knowledge economy, a broad range of educational and instructional programs and services have been planned that focus on information literacy, early literacy, research skills, and using digital resources. Library educational programming includes book clubs, language-learning classes, musical events, and craft workshops, as well as events for children and their families, such as storytelling, crafts, and science exhibits. As of 2026, there were more than one million books available at the library.

== Heritage Library ==
In addition to the general-interest holdings (Main Collection) and academic online resources, the QNL houses the collections of the Heritage Library, which includes rare books, manuscripts, and other materials related to Arab-Islamic civilization. Previously known as the Arab and Islamic Heritage Library, this collection was begun by His Excellency Sheikh Hassan bin Mohamed bin Ali Al Thani in 1979, and was integrated into QNL in 2012.

The Heritage Library provides an extensive range of historical sources about Qatar and the region, including writings by travelers and explorers who visited the Persian Gulf region over the centuries, Arabic manuscripts, historical maps and globes, as well as scientific instruments and early photographs. It also features approximately 2,400 precious manuscripts, among them ‘Mushafs’ (Holy Qur'an) and Arabic literature, with a primary focus on sciences such as geography, astronomy, and mathematics. The collection also includes printed materials from when printing was first introduced in 15th century Europe, including Latin translations dating from 15th to 17th centuries of works such as the famous Canon of Medicine of Avicenna (Ibn Sina).

The maps and manuscripts of the Heritage Collection have been digitized and are accessible to registered users through the library's online catalog. Portions of the collection of particular international significance have also been made freely available to users worldwide through the World Digital Library (WDL), which the QNL financially supports.

In August 2015, QNL was appointed as the Preservation and Conservation Centre (PAC) of the MENA region by the International Federation of Library Associations and Institutions. There were 13 other global PACs at the time of its appointment.

The QNL loaned manuscripts on astrolabes to the University of Oxford for the "Lines of Faith: Astronomy and the Art of the Astrolabe in the Islamic World exhibition", which ran from June to October 2025.

== Qatar Digital Library ==
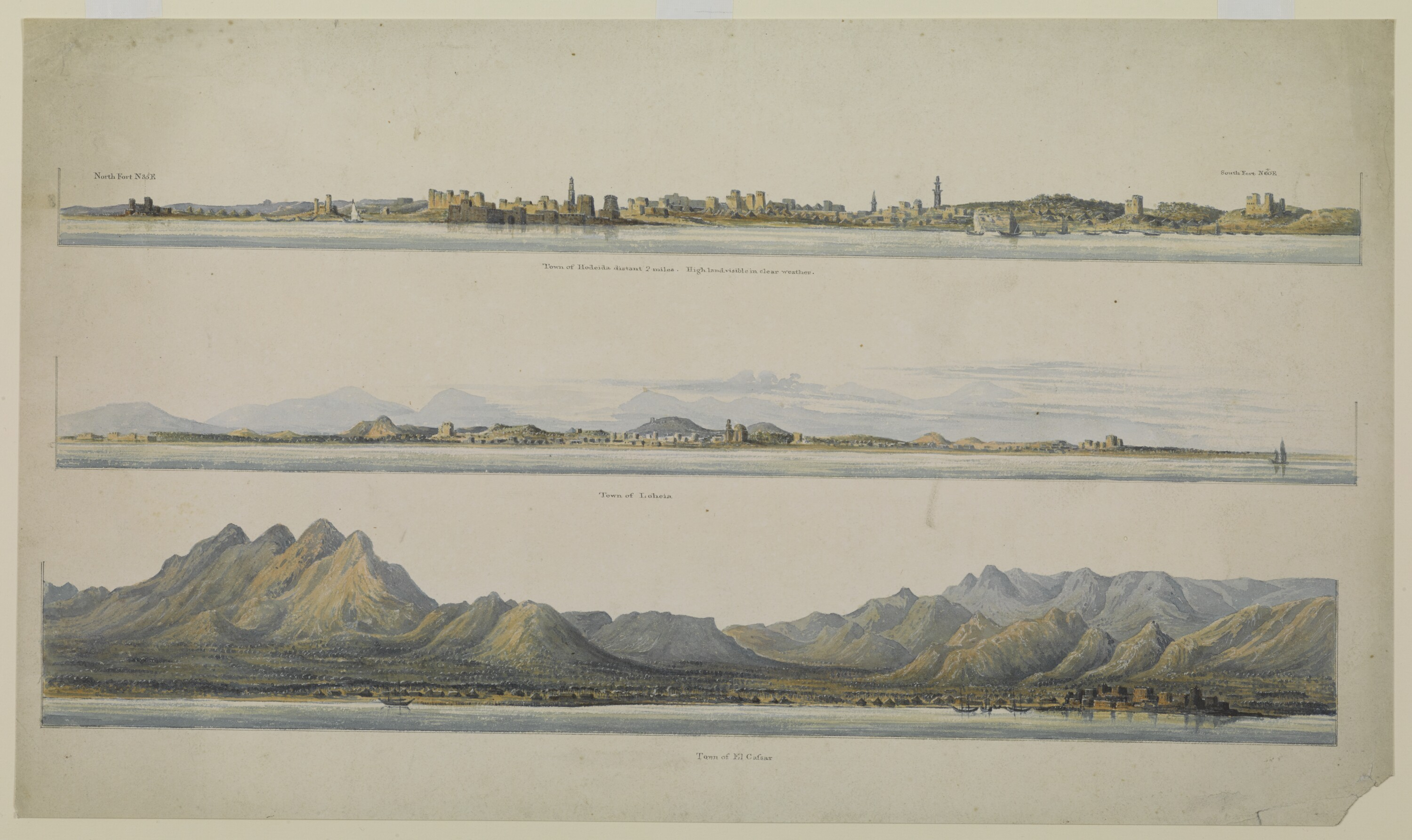
A drawing of three coastal towns in Arabia by Thomas Elwon in the 1830s obtained from QDL.

Qatar Digital Library (QDL) is the culmination of a partnership between Qatar Foundation, Qatar National Library, and the British Library in 2012. The partnership seeks to digitize a rich trove of heritage material documenting Arab and Islamic history and to make it freely accessible to the public through QDL, which was launched online in October 2014. The digital library, with an English and Arabic bilingual interface, encompasses 1.5 million pages of items held by the British Library pertaining to the history of the Persian Gulf region. These include documents dating from the mid-18th century to the 1950s from the India Office Records and Private Papers (including the archives of the East India Company and its successor institutions); and 25,000 pages are of medieval Arabic scientific manuscripts. Phase 3 of the project aims at the digitization of another 900,000 pages and will initiate in January 2019.

== New Library building ==
Qatar National Library at night

QNL's new building, designed by Dutch architect Rem Koolhaas, was completed and opened to the public in a soft opening in November 2017. The state-of-the-art library facilities include a variety of collaborative and individual learning spaces, a children's library, a teen and young adult collection, computer labs, digital media production facilities, performance spaces, a restaurant and a café, an assistive technology area, and a writing center.

On 16 April 2018, the QNL held its official inauguration ceremony. It comprised a grand ceremony in which His Highness the Emir Sheikh Tamim bin Hamad al-Thani placed the one-millionth book on the shelves of QNL. The library's one million books collection includes 137,000 children books and 35,000 books for teenagers.

The library issued a competition in which members of Qatar Foundation could name the upcoming cafe. Three separate winners picked the winning name "Safahat," which means pages in Arabic. The cafe opened and began serving the public in late September 2018. Membership of the library is free for anyone holding a Qatar ID.

== Events and exhibitions ==
The library features various exhibitions that take place in various spots around the building.

The Qatar Philharmonic Orchestra performs monthly for the public for free. More than 80 other free events are held at the library every month, including a knitting group activity, where women come every Thursday and sit for four hours.

In April 2018, the QNL opened the 'Arab and German Tales – Transcending Cultures' exhibition, which was part of the Qatar Germany Year of Culture. The QNL hosted various events related to the Qatar – Indonesia Year of Culture 2023 including a writing challenge called 'November Novel', in which writers were encouraged to write 50,000 words within the month.

In January 2024, the QNL hosted the Inaugural "Teaching and Learning Qatari History" Forum. The QNL also hosted a number of events in February 2024 in connection with the Qatari National Sports Day.
