= Wassan Al-Khudhairi =

Iraqi-American curator

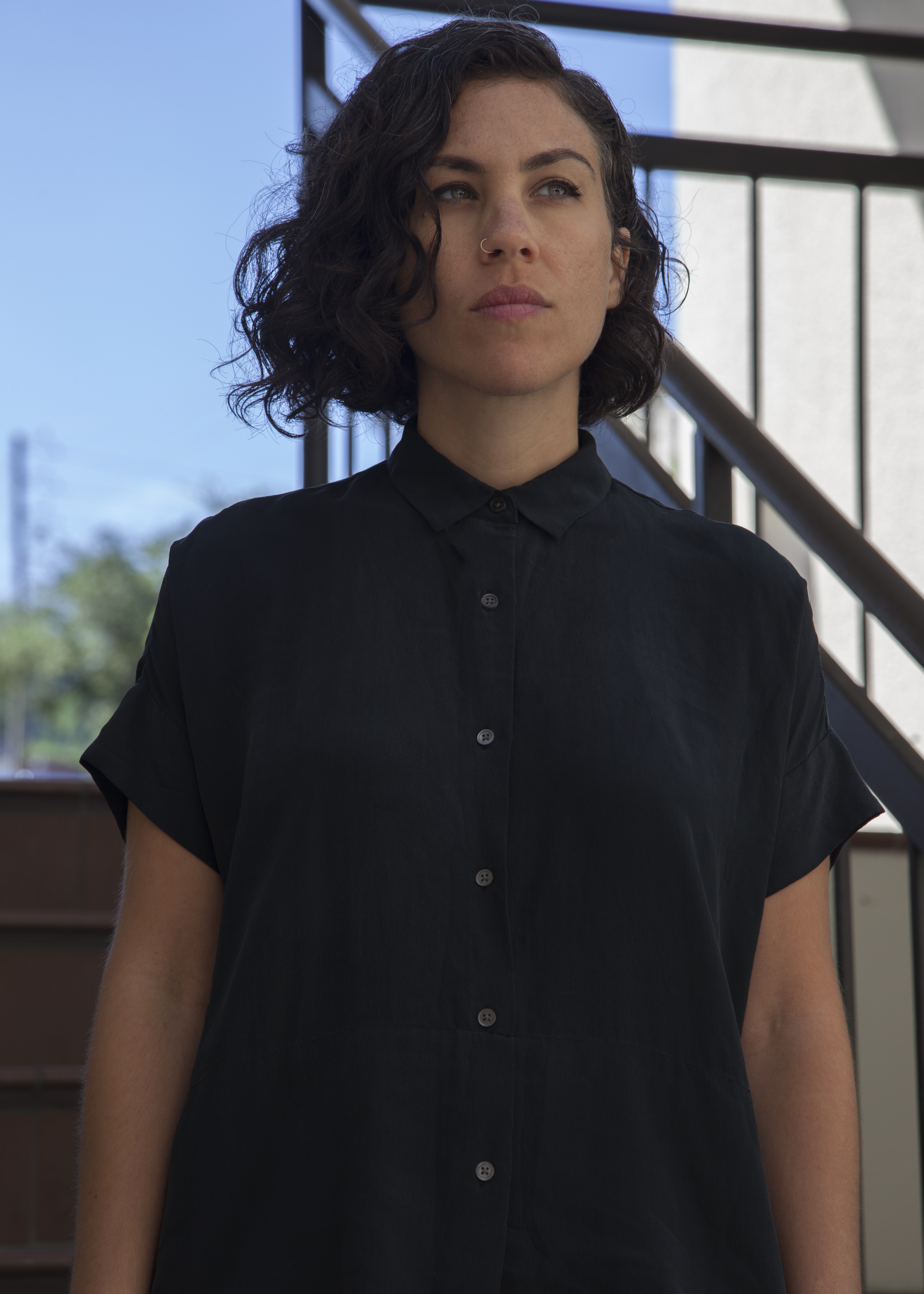
- Wassan Al-Khudhairi photographed by Orlando V. Thompson II
- Occupation: Curator
- Years active: 2010-present
- Known for: Chief Curator of Contemporary Art Museum St. Louis, former director of Mathaf
- Awards: AAMC Curatorial Award for Excellence (2019)

Academic background
- Education: BA in Art History from Georgia State University, MA in Islamic Art and Architecture from SOAS University of London
- Alma mater: Georgia State University, SOAS University of London

Academic work
- Discipline: Curatorial Studies
- Sub-discipline: Contemporary Arab Art
- Institutions: Contemporary Art Museum St. Louis, Mathaf
- Main interests: Modern and contemporary art from the Arab world, particularly Iraq
- Notable works: "Saraab: Cai Guo-Qiang", "Sajjil: A Century of Modern Art"

Wassan Al-Khudhairi is a curator who specializes in modern and contemporary art from the Arab world. In 2017 she was appointed Chief Curator of the Contemporary Art Museum St. Louis.

As the first ever director of Mathaf: Arab Museum of Modern Art, Al-Khudhairi was responsible for developing the newly established institution, overseeing policy development, acquisitions and collections registration. During her tenure at Mathaf, she curated “Saraab: Cai Guo-Qiang” (2011) and co-curated “Sajjil: A Century of Modern Art” (2010) along with Nada Shabout and Deena Chalabi, which showcased works from Mathaf's permanent collection. Under Al-Khudhairi's leadership, Mathaf solidified its commitment to not shy away from potentially controversial work and has hosted Art Dubai's Global Art Forum for the past several years

== Education ==
Al-Khudhairi received her BA in Art History from Georgia State University and M.A. with distinction in Islamic Art and Architecture from the School of Oriental and African Studies (SOAS) in London. Al-Khudhairi is of Iraqi origin and has lived in Kuwait, Saudi Arabia, Egypt, the U.K. and the U.S., where she worked at the High Museum of Art in Atlanta and the Brooklyn Museum of Art in New York.

Al-Khudhairi also completed the Museum Leadership Institute program at the Getty Leadership Institute in 2011 and took part in the Independent Curators International Curatorial Intensive in New York.

== Exhibitions ==
As a curator, her research interests are in modern art from the Arab world, with a particular emphasis on Iraq. Al-Khudhairi has presented on the role of Iraqi women artists in formulating modernism in Iraq. Al-Khudhairi's work often considers questions such as the use or recreation of history, memory, traumatic events such as war and civil uprising.

Al-Khudhairi was a Keynote speaker at the 2012 Communicating the Museum conference. She curated “Third Space: Shifting Conversations about Contemporary Art” at the Birmingham Museum of Art. The exhibition included works of contemporary art from the Museum's permanent collection. It was on exhibit from January 28, 2017 – January 6, 2019 and won the 2019 AAMC Curatorial Award for Excellence

Al-Khudhairi was a Co-Artistic Director of ROUNDTABLE: The 9th Gwangju Biennale (Korea, 2012).

In 2017, she was the co-curator of the 6th Asian Art Biennial in Taiwan. She became a fellow at the Center for Curatorial Leadership in 2021, followed by being named a Pew Fellowship panellist in 2022.

For the 2024 MFA thesis exhibition, Al-Khudhairi was selected to be one of the four Distinguished Critics. She was appointed, together with Binna Choi and Noelle M.K.Y. Kahanu, as curator of the Hawai'i Triennial, which will be held from February to May 2025.
