= Mathaf: Arab Museum of Modern Art =

Museum of modern and contemporary art in Qatar

- متحف : المتحف العربي للفن الحديث
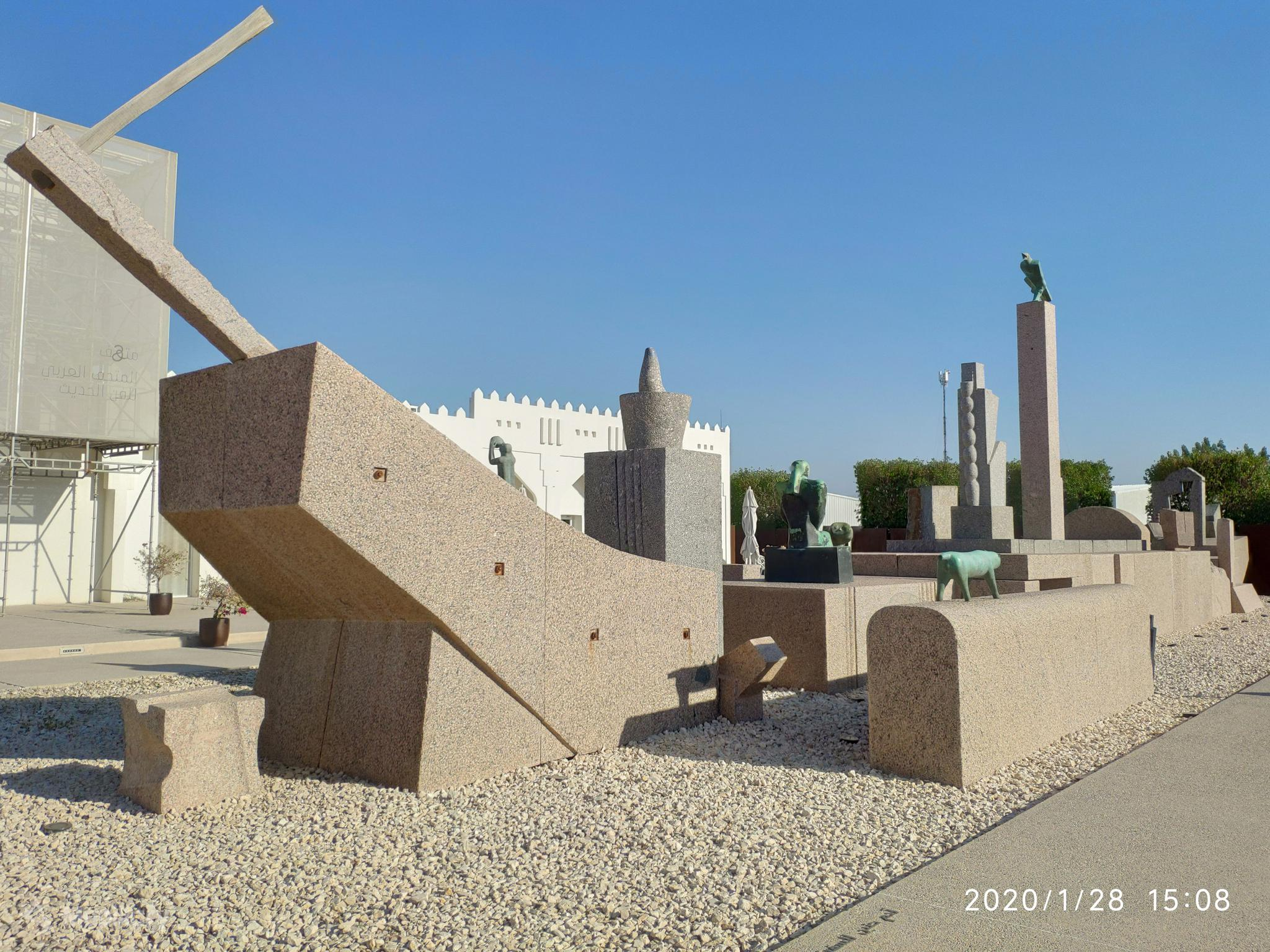
- Interactive fullscreen map
- Established: December 2010
- Location: Doha, Qatar
- Coordinates: 25°18′38″N 51°25′11″E
- Type: Art Museum
- Director: Zeina Arida
- Owner: Qatar Museums
- Website: www.mathaf.org.qa/en/

Mathaf: Arab Museum of Modern Art (متحف : المتحف العربي للفن الحديث) is a museum in Doha, Qatar with over 9,000 objects. Established in 2010, it is considered a major cultural attraction in the country.

Mathaf houses the world's largest collection of modern and contemporary Arab art.

== History ==
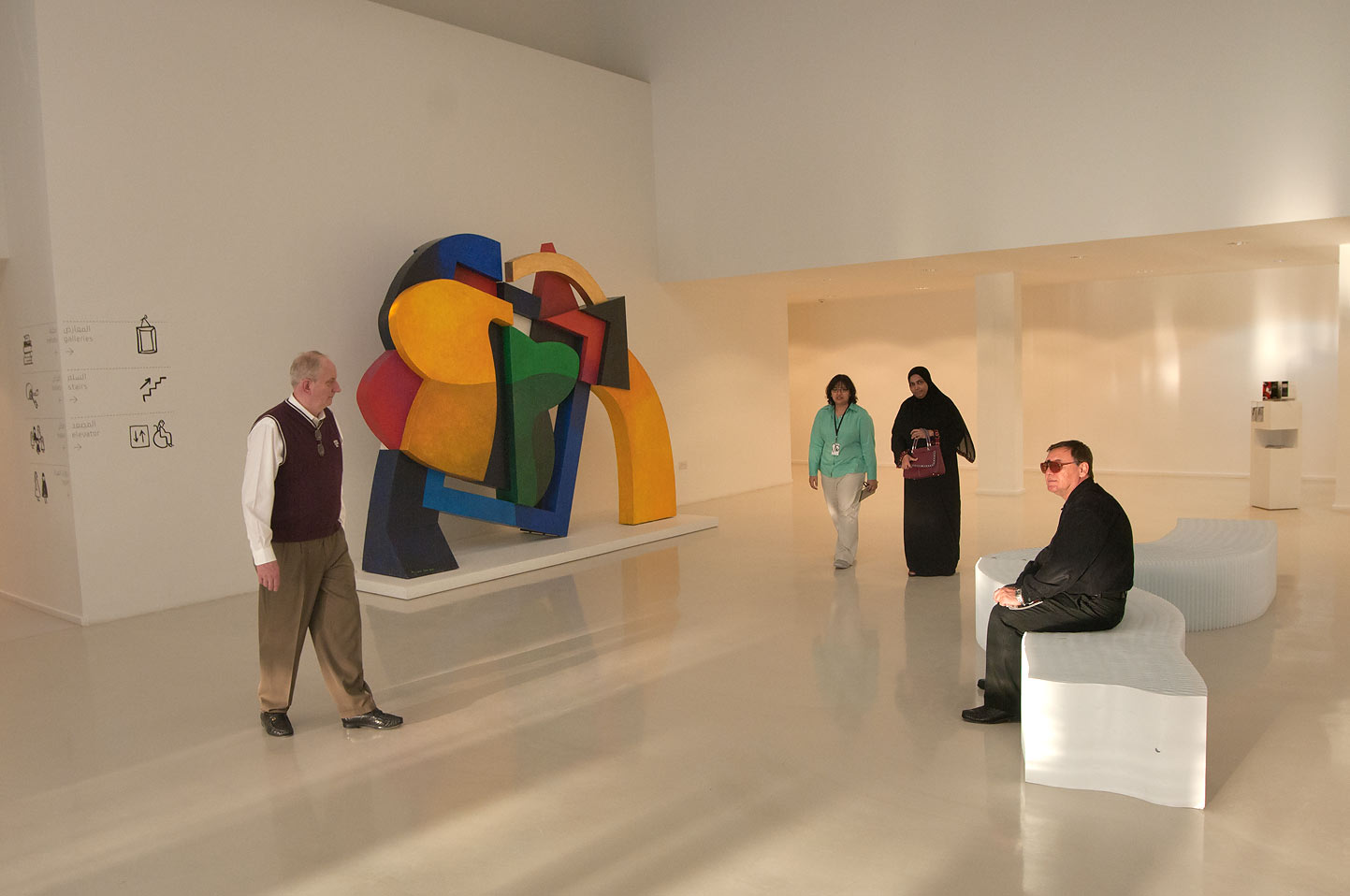
Mathaf: Arab Museum of Modern Art interior in 2011

Mathaf (متحف in Arabic) translates to "museum". The initial collection was gathered by Sheikh Hassan bin Mohammed Al Thani, later becoming a public institution chaired by Sheikha Al-Mayassa Al Thani. Sheikh Hassan started building a collection in the early 1990s of art created by artists from the Arab world over the last 200 years with the aim of creating a museum that could capture and represent artists from this region. From the 1990s and early 2000s, the collection was housed in two private villas in Madinat Khalifa in Doha while Sheikh Hassan and early advisors and staff conceived of an idea of what an Arab perspective on modern and contemporary art and museums could be.

In 2010, the museum opened its doors in the Qatar Foundation's Education City in the Doha Metropolitan Area in a former school building transformed by the French architect Jean-François Bodin. At the time, it was the first museum dedicated to modern and contemporary art in the country. Artist and former staff member Sophia Al-Maria recounts the early intentions of Sheikh Hassan and the founding team as shaping the institution to be a "twenty-first century 'post-museum'...a fledgling term for transparent, interaction-oriented museum models." The inaugural exhibitions included "Sajjil: A Century of Modern Art," featuring 240 artworks by more than 100 artists curated by Nada Shabout, Wassan Al-Khudhairi, and Deena Chalabi; "Interventions: A Dialogue Between the Modern and the Contemporary," curated by Nada Shabout; and "Told / Untold / Retold," curated by Sam Bardaouil and Till Fellrath and featuring newly commissioned works by 23 contemporary artists.

In 2013, Mathaf launched the Encyclopedia of Modern Art and the Arab World, a resource offering detailed biographies that have been researched by scholars and independent historians as well as essays, videos, and interviews.

In March 2020, the museum closed to the public because of the COVID-19 pandemic, with parts of the collections still being accessible online through a partnership with the Google Arts & Culture platform. The museum reopened in August 2020 with three new exhibitions "Lived Forward: Art and Culture in Doha from 1960-2020", "Huguette Caland: Faces and Places", curated by Mohammed Rashid Al Thani and "Yto Barrada: My Very Educated Mother Just Served Us Nougat", curated by Laura Barlow.

Wassan Al-Khudhairi was the inaugural chief curator and director of the museum, where she served from 2007–2012. Michelle Dezember served as interim director from 2012–2013. Moroccan curator Abdellah Karroum was appointed director of Mathaf in June 2013, where he served until May 2021. In November 2021, Qatar Museums appointed Zeina Arida, the previous director of the Sursock Museum in Beirut, as the new director of Mathaf, replacing Abdellah Karroum who was reassigned as curatorial advisor to the director of the National Museum of Qatar Sheikha Amna Al Thani.

== Collection ==
The 5,500-square-meter (59,000-square-foot) museum, located in a former school building in Doha's Education City, has a collection of more than 9,000 artworks, as communicated in 2014, that offers a rare comprehensive overview of modern Arab art, representing the major trends spanning from the 1840s to the present. The collection was donated by Sheikh Hassan bin Mohamed bin Ali Al Thani to Qatar Foundation, and was later acquired by Qatar Museums Authority. It is thought to be one of the largest collections of Arab-produced paintings and sculptures in the world. Qatar Museums Authority chairwoman, Sheikha Al-Mayassa Al Thani, stated upon the opening of Mathaf in 2010 that, "[...] we are making Qatar the place to see, explore and discuss the creations of Arab artists of the modern era and of our own time."

== Exhibitions ==
Mathaf permanent collection exhibition occupies seven galleries in the upper floor, while the atrium and five galleries are dedicated to temporary exhibitions. The museum looks at major modern and contemporary movements represented in the collection. The permanent collection includes works by Etel Adnan, Yousef Ahmad, Manal AlDowayan, Farid Belkahia, Kamal Boullata, Saloua Raouda Choucair, Jilali Gharbaoui, Shirin Neshat, Shakir Hassan Al Said, Wael Shawky, and Chaibia Talal.

Mathaf opened on 30 December 2010 with an exhibition called Sajjil, which means "act of recording" in Arabic, and featured a cross-section of Arab art over the previous 100 years. Simultaneously, the museum hosted Interventions (an exhibition of new commissions by five pivotal modernist Arab artists (Dia Azzawi, Farid Belkahia, Ahmed Nawar, Ibrahim el-Salahi and Hassan Sharif) and Told/Untold/Retold, an ambitious exhibition of new commissions by twenty-three contemporary Arab artists.

Mathaf's following exhibition, Cai Guo-Qiang: Saraab, ran from 5 December 2011 to 26 May 2012. The first solo show to be organized by the museum, Cai Guo-Qiang: Saraab showcased more than fifty works, including seventeen newly commissioned artworks, by the renowned contemporary artist Cai Guo-Qiang. Saraab ("mirage") re-imagined historical relations between China and the Persian Gulf region and reaffirmed Mathaf's commitment to presenting a unique Arab perspective on modern and contemporary art. The exhibition opened with Cai Guo-Qiang's largest ever daytime explosion event, Black Ceremony.

Tea with Nefertiti: the Making of the Artwork by the Artist, the Museum and the Public was held from November 2012 to March 2013. Through revisiting the contested histories of how Egyptian collections have been amassed by numerous museums from the 19th century onwards, this exhibition brings together antiquities, modernist works, archives and 26 international contemporary artists and artist collectives.

In November 2014, Mathaf opened the permanent exhibition "Summary, Part 1" with 8,000 pieces of contemporary art. "Summary, Part 2" was opened in September 2017 as an updated permanent exhibition to showcase different pieces of Mathafs collection together with two exhibitions from the FOCUS: Works from Mathaf Collection series.

In 2015 Mathaf started a series of solo exhibitions called FOCUS: Works from Mathaf Collection, with the featured artist all being part of the permanent collection of Mathaf. The series opened with exhibitions from artists Farid Belkahia, Abdelhalim Radwi, Faraj Daham and Inji Aflatoun and was held on Mathaf's ground floor exhibition space from October 2015 to February 2016.

The museums also works together with other museums and institutes like the Reina Sofia Museum in Madrid, the Palais de Tokyo in Paris or the Qatar National Library.

From March to May 2023 the museum hosted the exhibition "I Am The Traveler And Also The Road", which was part of the Tasweer Photo Festival.

In October 2023 the Museum opened four exhibitions that were on display until March 2024. The exhibitions are meant to bring more attention to contemporary Arab art. The exhibitions consist of "Introspection as Resistance", a solo show by Iraqi artist Mehdi Moutashar, "Cities Under Quarantine: The Mailbox Project" by Lebanese artist Abed Al Kadiri, "Distilled Lessons: Abstraction in Arab Modernism" and "De/Constructed Meanings".

As part of the 2024 Years of Culture initiative, some permanent galleries were updated to highlight Moroccan artist such as Chaibia Talal or Mohamed Melehi.

From April until August 2025, the museum displayed the three exhibitions "Qatar: Close to my Soul", "Your Ghosts Are Mine: Expanded Cinemas, Amplified Voices" and "Wafa al-Hamad: Sites of Imagination", which is the first solo exhibition of works from Wafa al-Hamad.

Other exhibitions organized by Mathaf include:

- "Forever Now: Five Anecdotes from the Permanent Collection", which features new readings based on the works of five artists from Mathaf's permanent collection.
- "Selections from the Collection", conceived by the curatorial team of Mathaf.
- "Khatt And After", which includes work from the permanent Collection of Mathaf: Arab Museum of Modern Art.
- "Adel Abdessemed: L'age d'or", curated by Pier Luigi Tazzi, November 2013 to January 2014.
- "Magdi Mostafa: Sound Element", Project Space, Mathaf, 2013.
- "Mathaf Permanent Collection: Paintings, sculptures and projects garden", December 2013 to February 2014.
- "Mona Hatoum: Turbulence", 2014.
- "Manal AlDowayan: Crash", 2014, curated by Laura Barlow.
- "Etel Adnan In All Her Dimensions", 2014, curated by Hans Ulrich Obrist.
- "The Closest I've Ever Come to a Scientific Experiment", by Ghadah Alkandari, curated by Ala Younis, 2014.
- "Shirin Neshat: Afterwards", curated by Abdellah Karroum, November 2014 to February 2015.
- "Wael Shawky: Crusades and Other Stories", 2015, curated by Abdellah Karroum.
- "Dia Azzawi: A Retrospective (from 1963 until tomorrow)", curated by Catherine David, 2016.
- "Hassan Sharif: Objects and Files", curated by Laura Barlow, March 2016 to September 2016.
- "Basim Madgy: It All Started With a Map and a Picture of Scattered Little Houses", curated by Laura Barlow, March 2017 to July 2017.
- "Bouthayna Al-Muftah: Echoes", July to September 2018.
- "Fateh Moudarres: Colour, Exetnsity and Sense", curated by Sara Raza, October 2018.
- "Mounira Al Solh: I strongly believe in our right to be frivolous", October 2018 to February 2019.
- "Raqs Media Collective: Still More World", curated by Laura Barlow, 2019.
- "M. F. Husain: Horses of the Sun", curated by Ranjit Hoskote, March 2019.
- "El Anatsui: Triumphant Scale", curated by Okwui Enwezor, October 2019.
- "Kader Attia: On Silence", curated by Abdellah Karroum, November 2021 to March 2022.
- "Dadu’s light atelier". July to September 2022.
- "Majaz: Contemporary Art Qatar", September 2022 to February 2023.
- "Taysir Batniji: No Condition is Permanent", co-curated by Abdellah Karroum and Lina Ramadan, September 2022 to January 2023.
- "Sophia Al-Maria: Invisible Labors Daydream Therapy", curated by Amal Al Haag, September 2022 to January 2023.
- "One Tiger or Another", curated by Tom Eccles and Mark Rappolt, September 2022 to January 2023.
- "Almaha Almaadeed: Inspired by the Land", curated by Noora Abdulmajeed, September 2022 to January 2023.
- "Beirut and the Golden Sixties: A Manifesto of Fragility exhibition", curated by Sam Bardaouil and Natasha Gasparian, March 2023 to August 2023.
- "This Sand is made of Stars/this Sea is made of Pearls – Horizon Historiographies", September 2023 to December 2024.
- "Khalid Albaih: Shahid", curated by Fatma Mostafawi and Hadeel Al-Kohaji, May 2024 to August 2024.
- "Seeing Is Believing: the art and influence of Gérôme", curated by Emily Weeks, Giles Hudson, Sara Raza, November 2024 to February 2025.
- "Wafa Al-Hamad: Sites of Imagination", curated by Lina Ramadan, April 2025 to August 2025.

== Education initiatives ==
As a museum founded on the premise of education and scholarship, there are a wide number of programs to engage multiple audiences including schools, universities, families, artists, and scholars. Highlights include the program Mathaf Voices, which trains local university students to give exhibition tours from their own perspectives, and Artist Encounters, which invites artists to discuss concepts and lead workshops based on their processes. In 2022, the museum also cooperated with the Doha Film Institute on a short story competition for teenagers. The museum also houses a library. The museum launched the Wall of Art – Art for a Brighter Future initiative in 2025. The initiative was made up of art sessions attended by children from Qatar and Gaza and in collaboration with Palestinian artist and journalist Bilal Khaled.

== Research initiatives ==
The museum, in collaboration with Qatar Foundation, has published an online encyclopedia containing the biographies of Arab artists. The Encyclopaedia of Modernity and the Arab World is published by Mathaf Curatorial and Research department, as a peer reviewed platform linking the museum to University.

== See also ==
- List of museums in Qatar

== Gallery ==
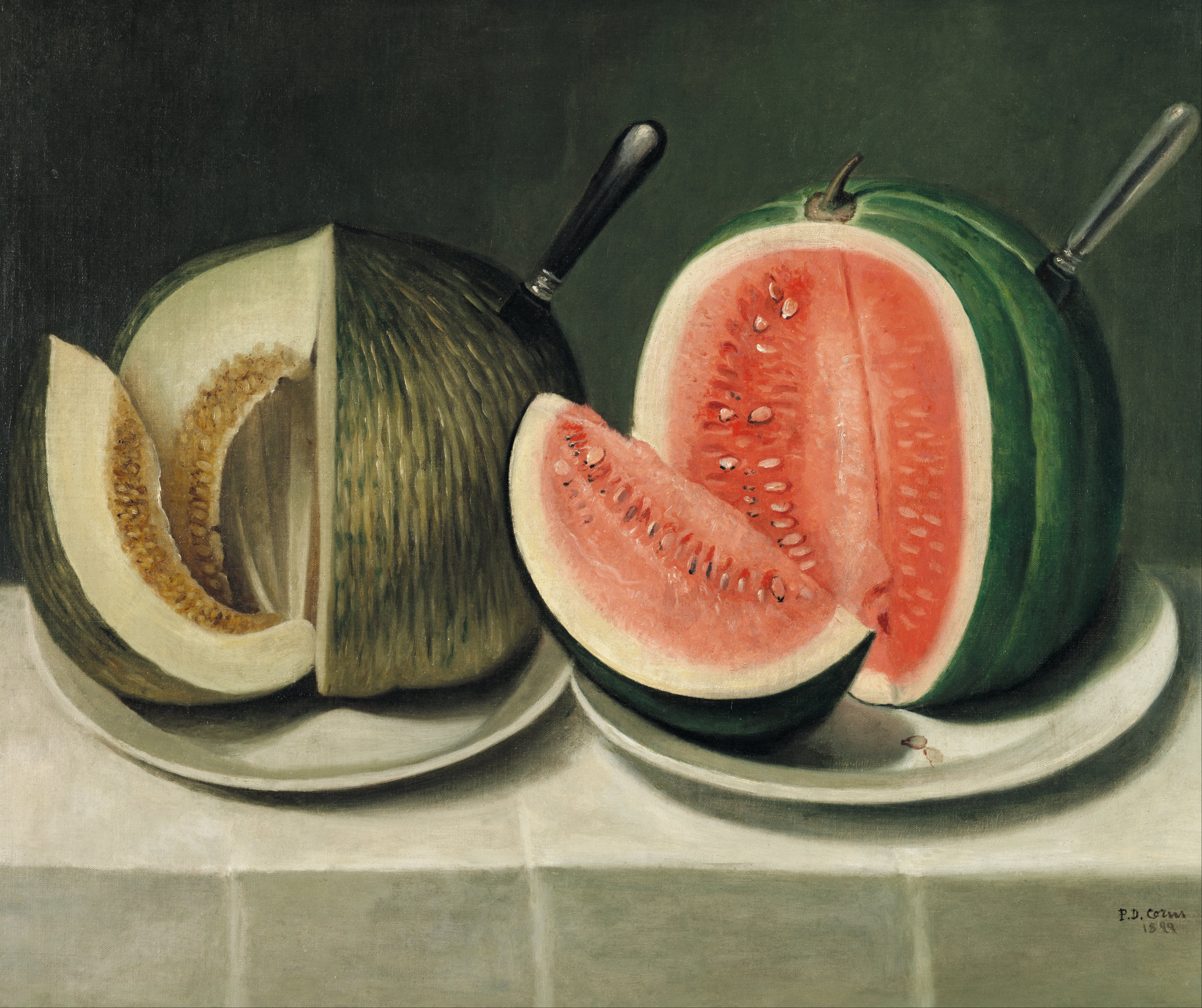
Melons, by Daoud Corm, 1899

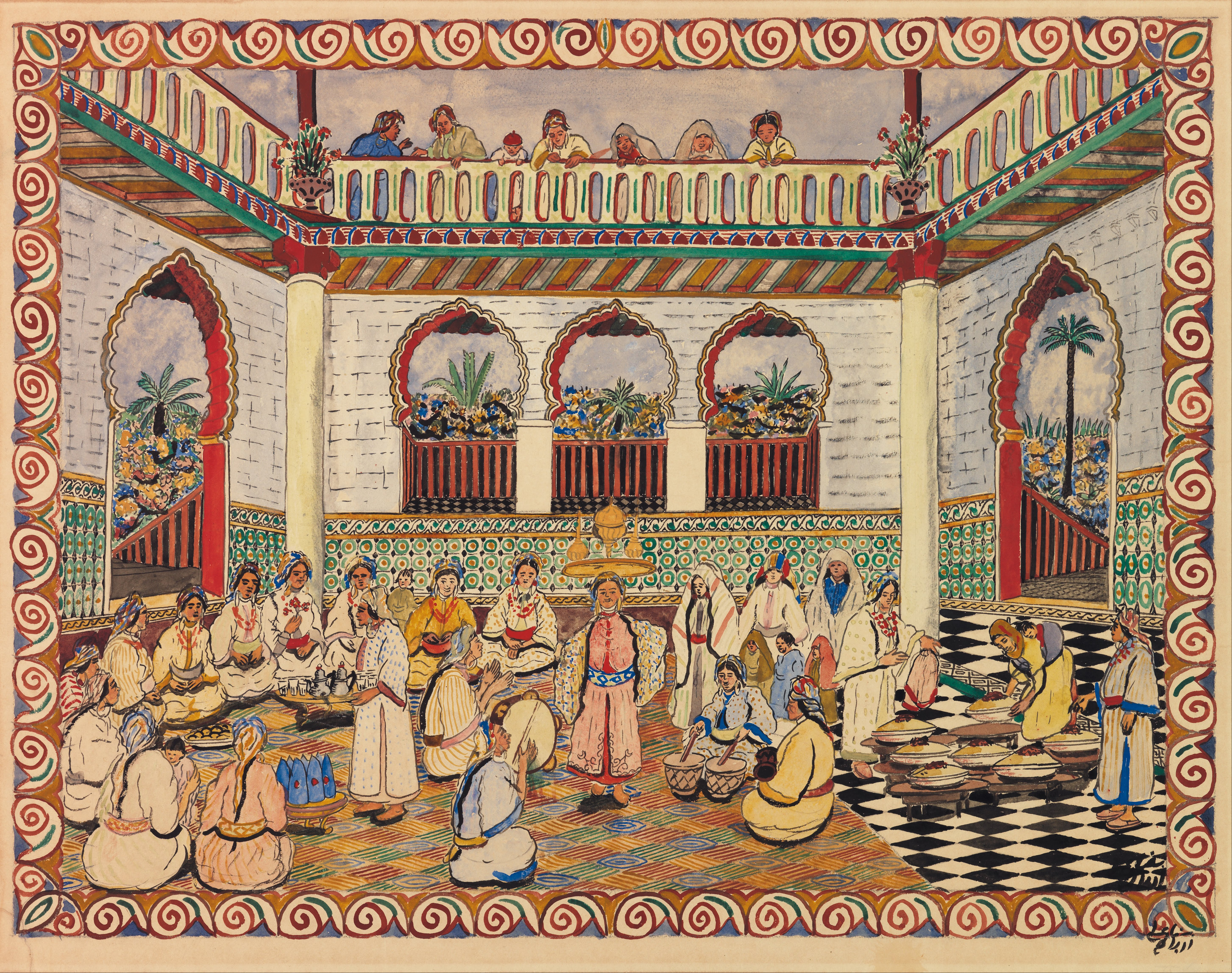
Festival Scene, Mohammed Ben Ali Rbati

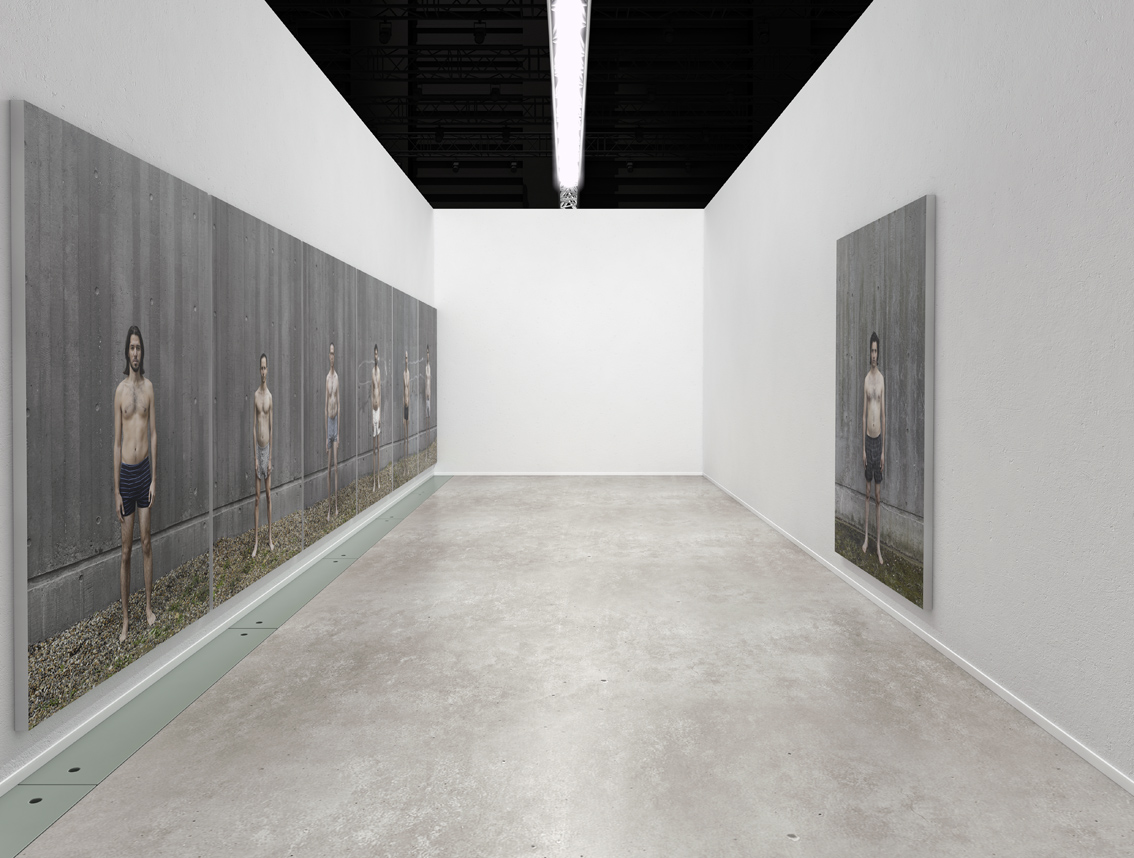
Settlement - Six Israelis & One Palestinian, by Steve Sabella, 2008–2010
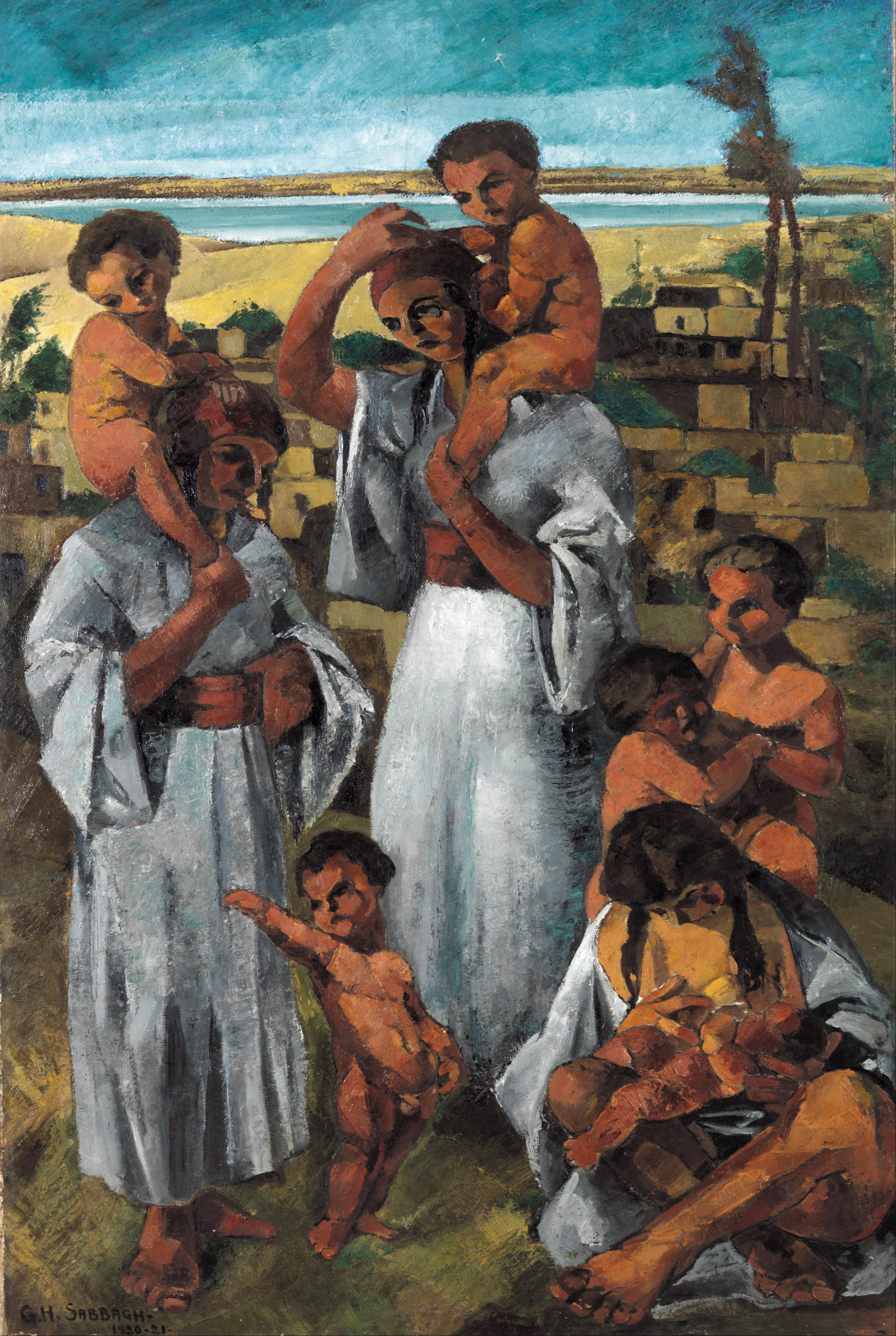
Arab Motherhood, by Georges Hanna Sabbagh, 1920–1921

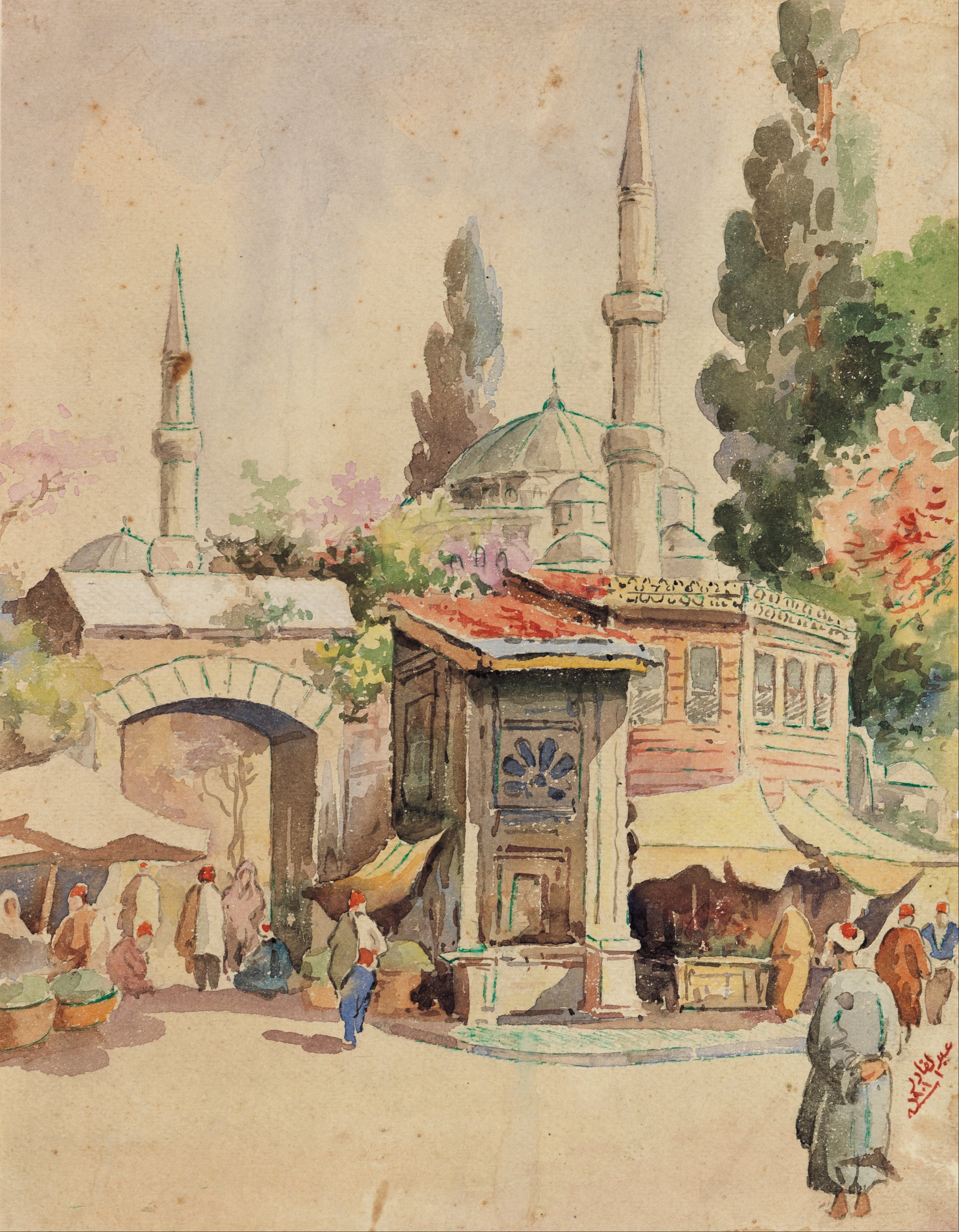
Abdul Qadir al-Rassam

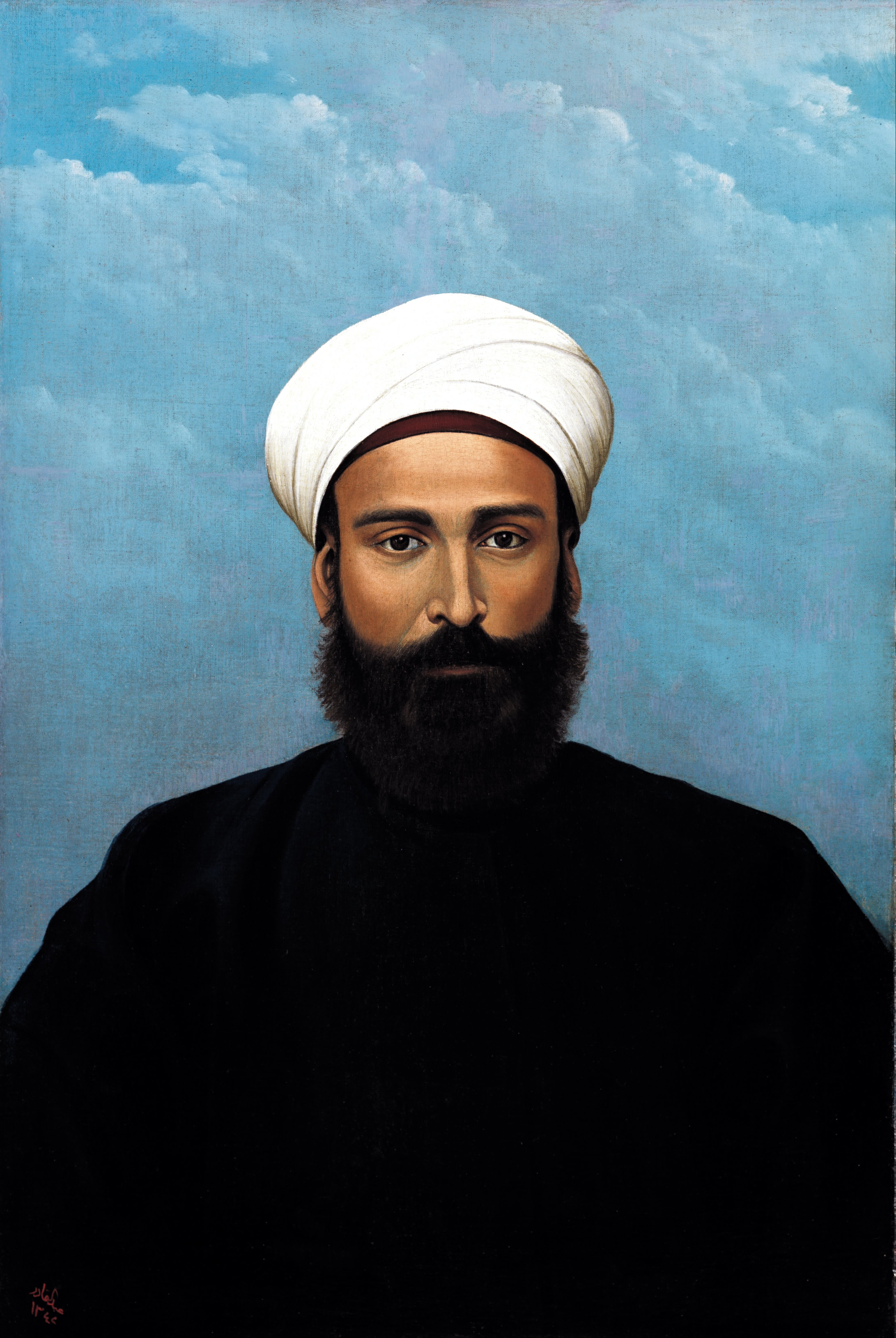
Portrait of Mohamed Darouich al Allousi, by Abdul Qadir Al Rassam, 1924
