= Nada Shabout =

American art historian

Nada M. Shabout
- Born: January 8, 1962 (age 64); Glasgow, Scotland
- Citizenship: United States
- Occupations: Art historian, Professor of Art History
- Known for: Modern and contemporary Arab art
- Board member of: President and Co-founder, Association for Modern and Contemporary Art of the Arab World, Iran, and Turkey
- Awards: Fulbright Scholar (2007), Andy Warhol Foundation Arts Writers Grant (2018), Kuwait Prize for Arts and Literature (2021)

Academic background
- Education: University of Texas at Arlington
- Thesis: 'Modern Arab Art and the Metamorphosis of the Arabic Letter' (1999)

Academic work
- Discipline: Art history
- Sub-discipline: Modern and contemporary Arab art
- Institutions: University of North Texas
- Notable works: Modern Arab Art: Formation of Arab Aesthetics (2007); * New Vision: Arab Art in the Twenty-First Century (2009) * Modern Art in the Arab World: Primary Documents (2018)
- Website: UNT Faculty Page

Nada M. Shabout (born 8 January 1962, Glasgow, Scotland) is an Iraqi-American art historian specializing in modern Iraqi art. She has been a professor of art history at the University of North Texas since 2002. She is the president and co-founding board member of the Association for Modern and Contemporary Art (AMCA) of the Arab World, Iran, and Turkey.

== Biography ==
=== Early life and education ===
Nada Shabout was born in Glasgow, Scotland, the oldest of three children born to a Palestinian mother and Iraqi father. The family returned to Iraq when she was 6 years old and she graduated from Baghdad High School for Girls.

Shabout was trained in architecture at the New York Institute of Technology, the University of Texas at Arlington and the Architectural Association School of Architecture, London, England. She has also earned BFA fine arts, MA and PhD in the Humanities with a concentration in art history and criticism from the University of Texas at Arlington, 1999. She wrote her dissertation on "Modern Arab Art and the Metamorphosis of the Arabic Letter." A book based on her dissertation Modern Arab Art: Formation of Arab Aesthetics, was published by the University of Florida Press, 2007.

=== Career ===
She has been an Assistant Professor of Art History at the University of North Texas since 2002, teaching Arab visual culture and Islamic art. It was here that she introduced one of the world's first university classes on the subject of modern Arab visual art. She has been working on the documentation of modern Iraqi heritage, particularly the collection previously held at the Iraqi Museum of Modern Art since her visit to Baghdad in June 2003. She has been organizing panels and presenting around the world on the state of Iraq's modern heritage following 2003, the relationship of identity and visual representations in modern and contemporary Iraqi art, and exhibitions of Middle Eastern arts in the West since 911.

She is a co-founder and president of the Association of Modern and Contemporary Art from the Arab World, Iran and Turkey (AMCA). In 2020, Shabout was elected for a four-year term to the 2020 College Art Association of America, Inc. Board of Directors meeting Feb. 14 at the 108th CAA Annual Conference in Chicago.

Shabout was a long-term advisor at the Qatari Mathaf: Arab Museum of Modern Art and a member of the Board of Governors of the Cultural Development Center of the Qatar Foundation. Shabout founded, together with Sarah Whitcher Kansa and Saleem Al-Bahloly, the Modern Art Iraq Archive in 2011. She was a regent professor of the Contemporary Arab and Muslim Cultural Studies Initiative at the University of North Texas.

She is the curator of the traveling exhibition "Dafatir: Contemporary Iraqi Book Art," 2005-07; and "Moments from 20th Century Iraqi Art," at the Montalvo Art Center, California, 2007-2008. She has edited the exhibition catalogue "Dafatir: Contemporary Iraqi Book Art" (UNT Art Gallery, 2007).

Shabout has curated a number of exhibitions for Mathaf, including "Interventions: A Dialogue Between the Modern and the Contemporary" and "Sajjil: A Century of Modern Art" in 2010.

== Published works ==
=== Books ===
- Modern Arab Art: Formation of Arab Aesthetics, University of Florida Press, 2007.
- New Vision: Arab Art in the Twenty-First Century, Transglobe Publishing Ltd. and Thames & Hudson, 2009.
- Modern Art in the Arab World: Primary Documents, Co-edited with Sarah Rogers and Anneka Lenssen, MoMA Publications, 2018.

=== Catalogues ===
- Dafatir: Contemporary Iraqi Book Art, Denton, TX: UNT Art Gallery, 2007.
- Modernism and Iraq, New York: Columbia University, Miriam and Ira D. Wallach Art Gallery, 2009.
- Interventions: A Dialogue Between the Modern and the Contemporary, Mathaf: Arab Museum of Modern Art, Doha, Qatar. Milan: Skira Publisher, 2010.
- Sajjil: A Century of Modern Art, Exhibition Catalogue, Co-editor and author, Mathaf: Arab Museum of Modern Art, Doha, Qatar. Milan: Skira Publisher, 2010.
- Forever Now: Five Anecdotes from the Permanent Collection, Mathaf: Arab Museum of Modern Art, Doha, Bloomsbury, Qatar Foundation Publishing, 2012.

=== Articles ===
She is the author of several articles that examine legal and ethical responsibilities of the US in Iraq after 2003, including:

- "Opinion: An ancient treasure may be returned to Iraq. Many others are still lost," The Washington Post, July 31, 2021.
- "The Iraqi Museum of Modern Art: Ethical Implications," Collections (Vol. 2, no. 4, May, AltaMira Press, 2006);
- "Historiographic Invisibilities: The Case of Contemporary Iraqi Art," the International Journal of the Humanities (volume 3, Number 9, 2006);
- "The "Free" Art of Occupation: Images for a "New" Iraq," Arab Studies Quarterly (Volume 28, Number 3 and 4 Summer and Fall 2006); and
- "Preservation of Iraqi Modern Heritage in the Aftermath of the US Invasion of 2003," in Gail Levin and Elaine A. King, eds, An anthology on Ethics in the Art World (Allworth Press, 2006).

== Awards ==
Among her honors is The American Academic Research Institute in Iraq (TAARII) fellowship 2006 and 2007; and Fulbright Senior Scholar Program, 2007 Lecture/Research fellowship to Jordan Project, "Arab Art Now: A Study of the Contemporary Art Vision in Jordan." She received both an Andy Warhol Foundation Arts Writers Grant and The Presidential Excellency Award at the University of North Texas in 2018. In 2020, she received the University of North Texas' Regent's Professorship Award, which provides recognition for faculty at the rank of professor who have performed outstanding teaching, research and service to the profession, and who have achieved a high level of national and international recognition. She was the first professor from the department of Art Education and Art History to receive this award in the 33 years that the award had existed.

In 2021, Shabout received the Kuwait Prize for Arts and Literature from the Kuwait Foundation for the Advancement of Sciences, known regionally as the "Arab Nobel Prize," the foundation recognizes lifetime achievements of Arab researchers. Also in 2021, Shabout was selected by the Smithsonian American Art Museum and Renwick Gallery to deliver a Clarice Smith Distinguished Lecture in American Art.

== See also ==
- Women in the art history field
