= Hassan bin Mohamed Al Thani =

Qatari art collector (born 1960)

Hassan bin Mohamed bin Ali Al Thani
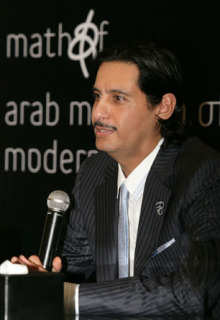
- Dr. Al Thani in a conference
- Born: 1960 (age 65–66); Doha, Qatar
- Spouse: Al Anoud bint Khalid al Thani
- Issue: Muhammad, Hamad, Moza, Maryam, Noor, Rawda, Al Jazi, Sara
- Arabic: الشیخ الدکتر حسن بن محمد بن علی آلثانی
- House: Al Thani (paternal); Al Thani (maternal)
- Father: Sheikh Mohammed bin Ali bin Abdullah Al Thani
- Mother: Sheikha Moza Al Thani
- Religion: Islam
- Occupation: Artist, Statesman

Sheikh Hassan bin Mohamed bin Ali Al Thani (born 1960 in Doha)He is a member of the Qatari royal family and the grandson of the former Emir of Qatar is a Qatari artist, collector, researcher, and educator in the field of modern art from the Arab world, India, and Asia. His multi-billion dollar art collection is one of the most valuable and extensive in the Middle East. He is Vice Chairperson of Qatar Museums Authority, Advisor for Cultural Affairs at Qatar Foundation and founder of Mathaf: Arab Museum of Modern Art.

In 2013, he was elected Chair of the International Council of Museums Arab Countries Alliance (ICOM-ARAB).

== Family ==
He is the son of Sheikh Muhammad bin Ali Al Thani and grandson of the former ruler of Qatar, the Emir Ali bin Abdulla Al Thani. He is married to Al-Anoud Khalid Al-Thani and is father of eight children.

== Education ==
Sheik Hassan studied "Art of the 20th Century" in a course at Qatar University in the mid-1980s. At that time, there was little information about Arab modern art, and there was not one single institution dedicated to Arab modern art in the whole region of the Middle East and North Africa. He then decided to build his own collection and expand his knowledge of Arab modern art by sponsoring and promoting Arab artists.

== Collection ==
In 1986, Sheikh Hassan started his own collection. The first artwork he bought was an upside-down pyramid by a Doha-born painter named Yousef Ahmad. Twenty-six years on, his collection has grown to 6000 artworks worth billions of dollars, acquired mostly from Qatari, Lebanese, Egyptian, Syrian and Iraqi artists. Today, his collection covers all phases of modern art in the Middle East from the 1840s to the present.

In 1994, Sheikh Hassan opened a private museum, and started helping and sponsoring artists from the region, especially Iraqis fleeing the Gulf War. In 2004, he offered the entire collection to Qatar Foundation and in 2009, the collection was transferred to Qatar Museums Authority.

== Hassan Bin Mohammed Center for Historical Studies ==
In 1997, the Hassan Bin Mohammed Center for Historical Studies was established by Sheikh Hassan. The center provides academic support for historical research and related studies which pertain to the history of Qatar and Arabia. The center's main area is the translation of documents, and in September 2024, it published the third volume of British documents preserved in the Indian Archives.

== Mathaf ==
When he started his collection, Sheikh Hassan's initial plan was to create an institution that would look after his collection and exhibit it to scholars, students and art lovers. In December 2010, his plan materialized with the opening of Mathaf: Arab Museum of Modern Art, the first museum in the region dedicated to Arab modern art. The museum now hosts the full collection of Sheikh Hassan. Hassan is also the president of Mathaf.

== Hereditary titles ==
- Sheikh (House of Thani)

== See also ==
- Qatar Museums Authority
- Mathaf: Arab Museum of Modern Art
- Museum of Islamic Art, Doha
- Collecting practices of the Al-Thani Family
