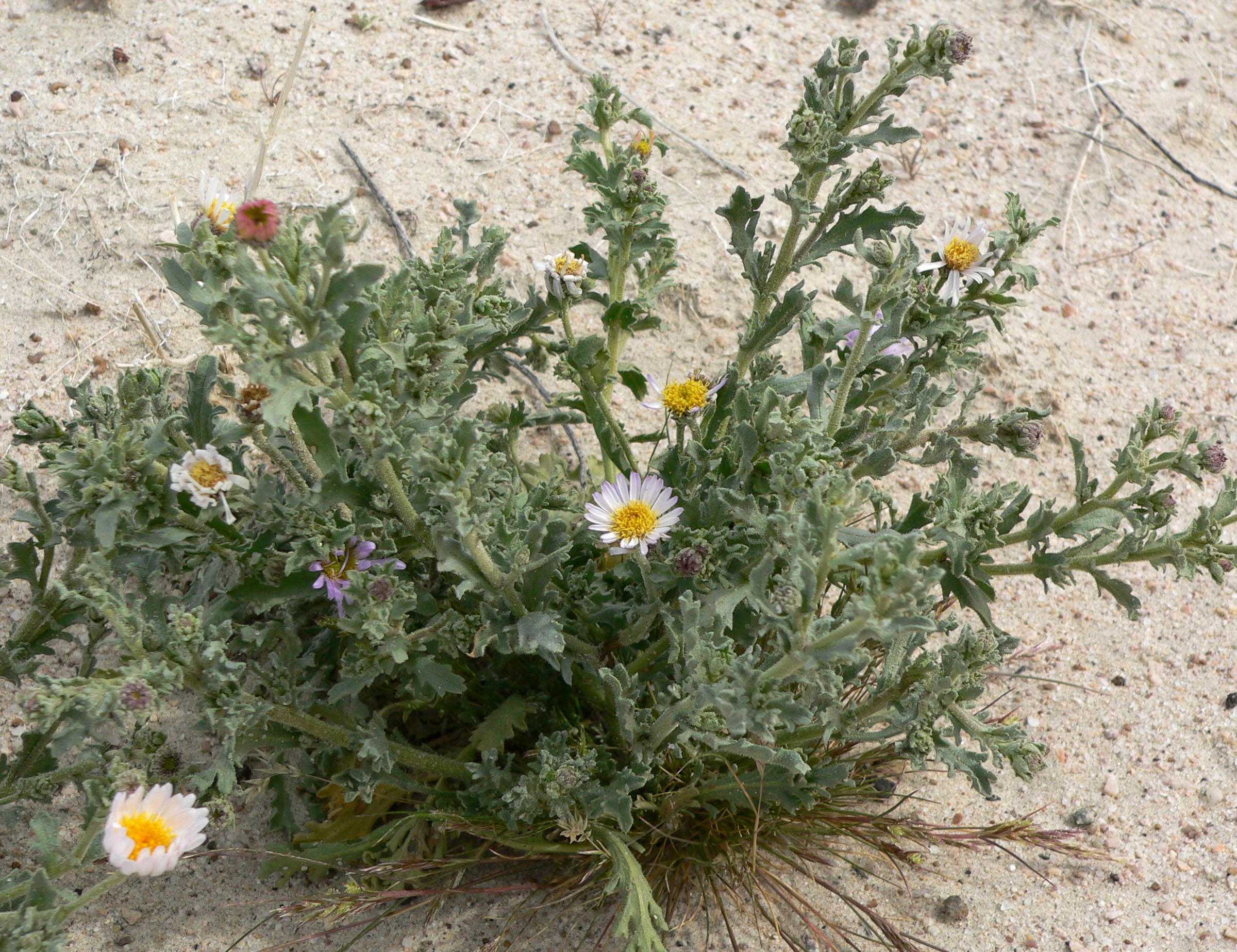
- Leucosyris arida

Scientific classification
- Kingdom: Plantae
- Clade: Tracheophytes
- Clade: Angiosperms
- Clade: Eudicots
- Clade: Asterids
- Order: Asterales
- Family: Asteraceae
- Subfamily: Asteroideae
- Tribe: Astereae
- Subtribe: Machaerantherinae
- Genus: Leucosyris; Greene

Synonyms
- Arida (R.L.Hartm.) D.R.Morgan & R.L.Hartm.

= Leucosyris =

Genus of plants

Leucosyris is a genus of flowering plants belonging to the family Asteraceae.

Its native range is southwestern and southern-central United States to Mexico.

Species:

- Leucosyris arida (B.L.Turner & D.B.Horne) Pruski & R.L.Hartm.
- Leucosyris blepharophylla (A.Gray) Pruski & R.L.Hartm.
- Leucosyris carnosa (A.Gray) Greene
- Leucosyris coulteri (A.Gray) Pruski & R.L.Hartm.
- Leucosyris crispa (Brandegee) Pruski & R.L.Hartm.
- Leucosyris mattturneri (B.L.Turner & G.L.Nesom) Pruski & R.L.Hartm.
- Leucosyris parviflora (A.Gray) Pruski & R.L.Hartm.
- Leucosyris riparia (Kunth) Pruski & R.L.Hartm.
- Leucosyris turneri (M.L.Arnold & R.C.Jacks.) Pruski & R.L.Hartm.
