= Zeina Arida =

Museum executive (born 1970)

Zeina Arida (born 1970) is an arts, culture, and heritage executive from Lebanon. In November 2021 she was appointed director of Mathaf: Arab Museum of Modern Art in Doha, Qatar.

== Early life and education ==
Arida was born in Beirut, Lebanon and educated in Beirut and Paris. She studied literature and theatre at Sorbonne University in Paris, graduating in 1993.

== Career ==
From 1997–2014, Arida was the director of the Arab Image Foundation, where she contributed to the development of the Middle East Photograph Preservation Initiative (MEPPi). From 2014, she was the director of the Sursock Museum in Beirut, where she raised over $2.5 million following the explosion in the port that created massive damage including to the museum.

Arida is a member of the board for the Board of Directors of MUCEM, on the Advisory Board of Darat al Funun, a member of the Arab Image Foundation, and member of the Scientific Committee of the Art Mill Museum in Doha. She also has worked for Unesco, the French Cultural Centre, and the French Embassy, service for which she has been awarded the Chevalier de l’Ordre des Arts et des Lettres by the French government. Arida has also been a member of CiMAM, an affiliated organisation of the ICOM, since 2011. In November 2021 she was appointed director of Mathaf: Arab Museum of Modern Art in Doha, Qatar. In 2023 she became a member of the ICOM Qatar committee. In 2025, she was a member of the advisory panel that chose Lina Ghotmeh as architect of the Qatari Pavilion at the Venice Biennale.
