= May Arida =

Lebanese socialite (1926–2018)

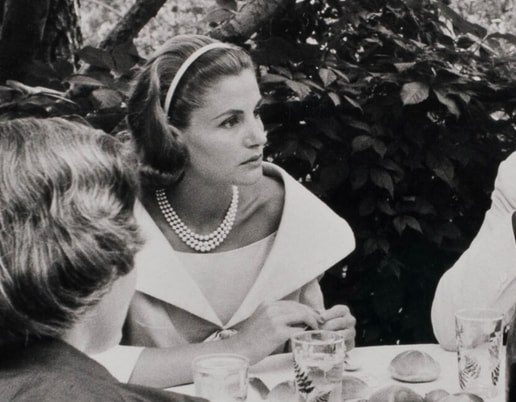

May Arida (Arabic: مي عريضة; 1926–2018) was a Lebanese socialite who helped found the Baalbek International Festival, for which she served as president from 1973 to 2016.

She was born May al-Khoury Saadeh (Arabic: مي الخوري سعادة) in Beirut, Lebanon in 1927, to Habib al-Khoury Saadeh (Arabic: حبيب الخوري سعادة) and his wife Marie Saab al-Khoury Saadeh (Arabic: ماري صعب الخوري سعادة). She married Ibrahim Sursock in 1942. They had three daughters, Amal, Jumana, and Linda. By 1950, they had separated, and she married Carlos Arida.

She was elected president of the Lebanese Water Skiing Federation from 1953 to 1961. In 1955, Lebanese president Camille Chamoun initiated the founding of the Baalbeck International Festival to foster international appreciation of Lebanese arts, and Arida was tasked with organizing the music and ballet components. She became the president of the festival in 1973. The Lebanese Civil War, beginning in 1975, disrupted the festival, though Arida said that the committee continued to meet and "never slowed its activities... even in times of war" ("n’a jamais freiné ses activités... même en période de guerre"). The war ended in 1990, and in 1997 the festival was revived.

Arida received a number of international honors for her patronage of the arts and international exchange, including the Gold Medal of Lebanese Merit in 1976, Knight of France's Legion of Honour in 1978, Commander of Lebanon's National Order of the Cedar in 2000, Commander of the Order of the Star of Italian Solidarity in 2005, and Commander of Spain's Order of Isabella the Catholic in 2009.

In 2013, she was the subject of a biography written in French by Nabil el-Azan, titled May Arida: Le rêve de Baalbeck ("The Dream of Baalbeck").

She resigned from the Baalbek International Festival in 2016. Arida died in 2018.
