= Doha =

Capital and largest city of Qatar

Doha الدوحة
- Capital city
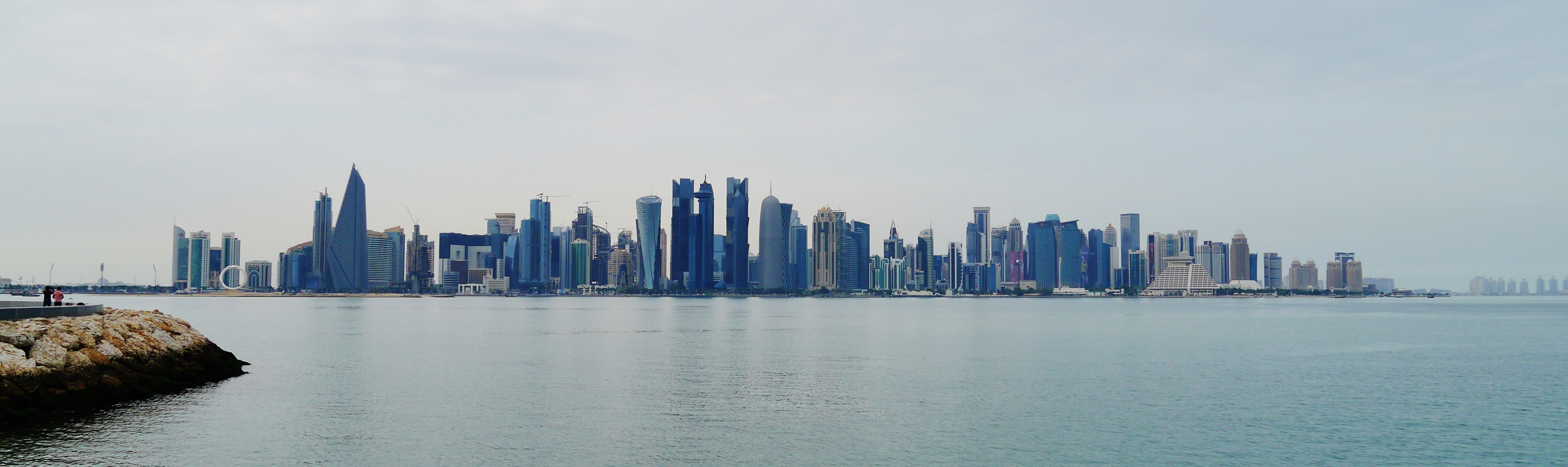
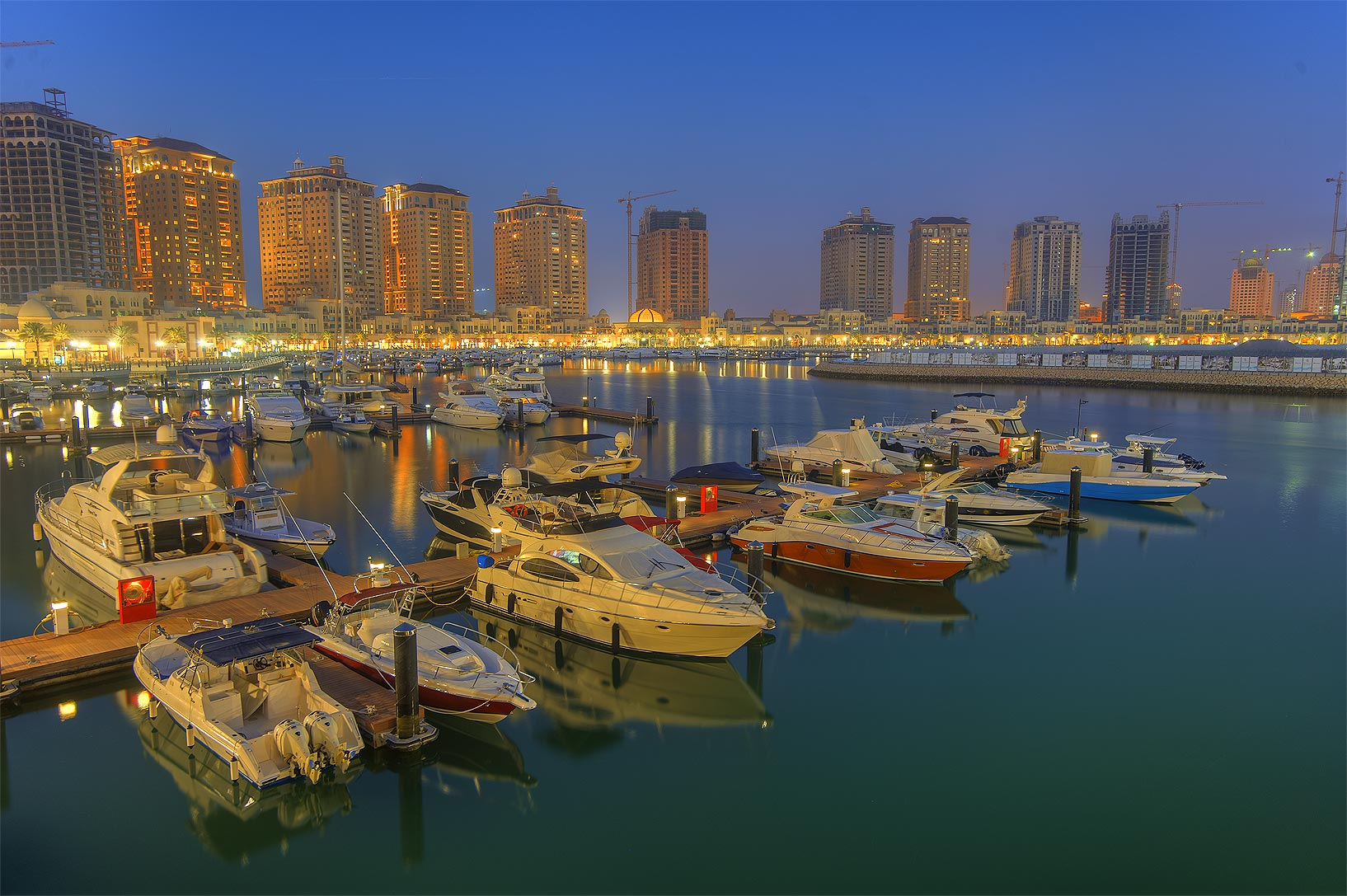
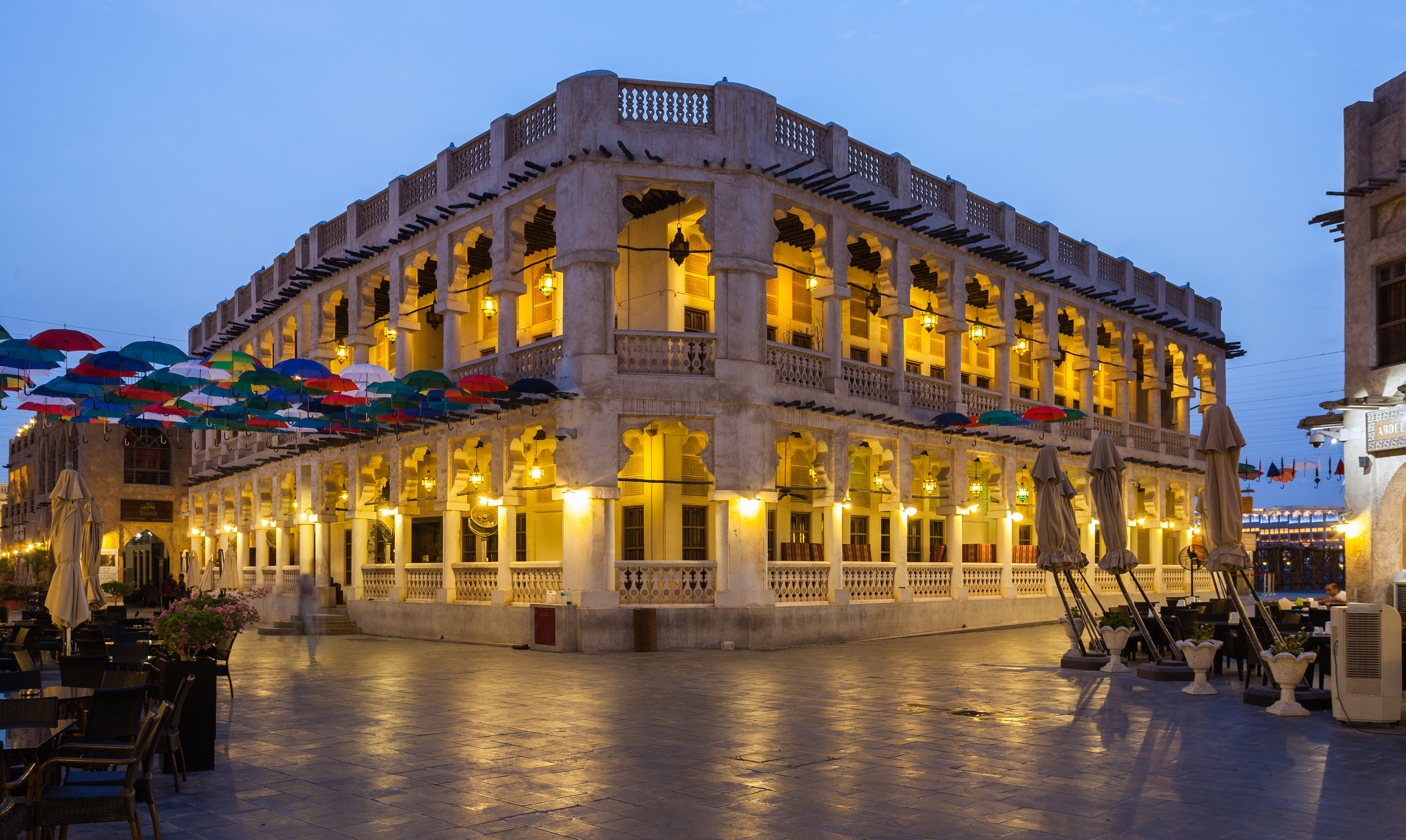
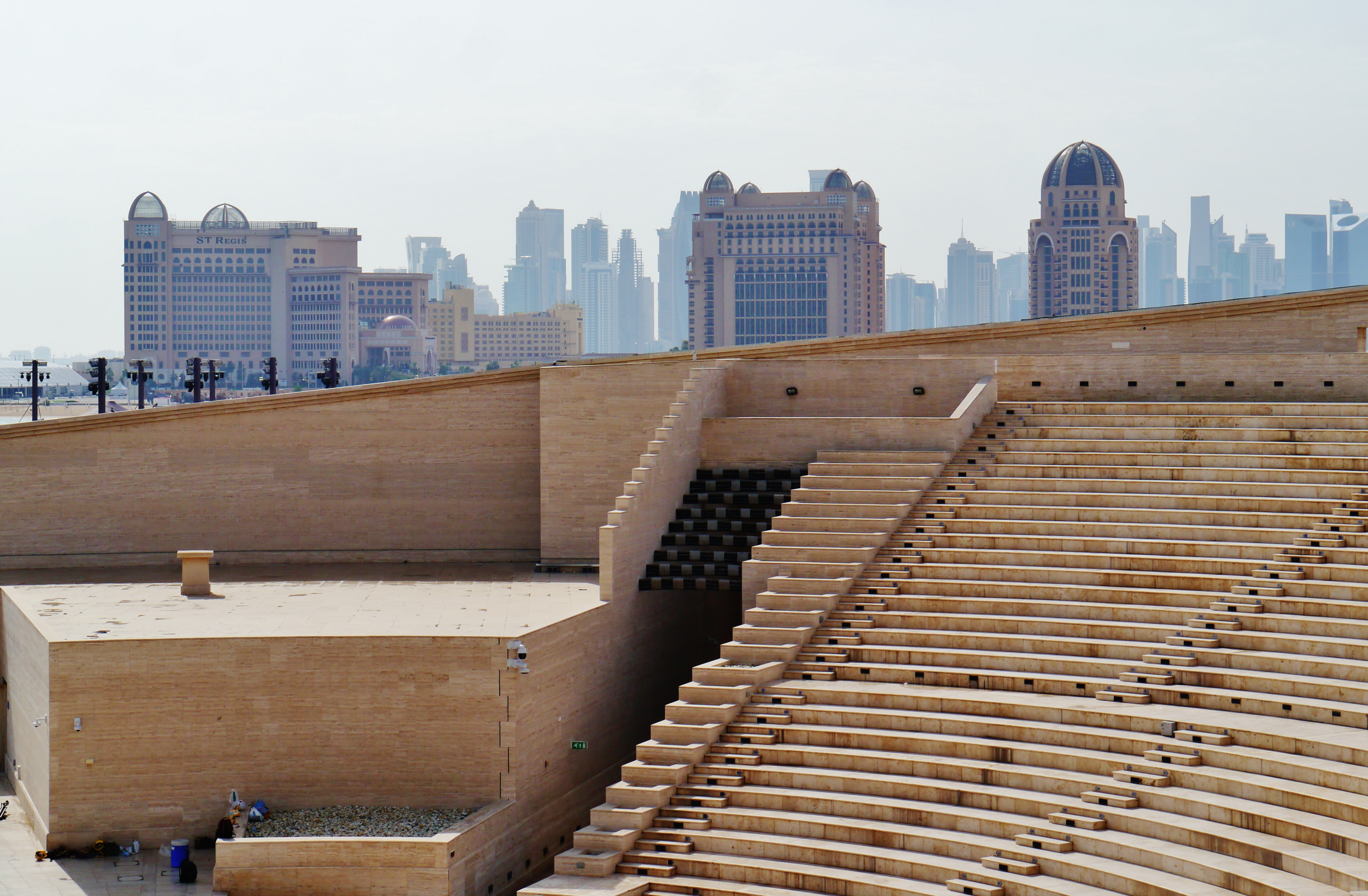
- Doha skyline The Pearl Marina Souq Waqif National Museum of Qatar Musheireb Downtown Doha Katara Cultural Village Museum of Islamic Art

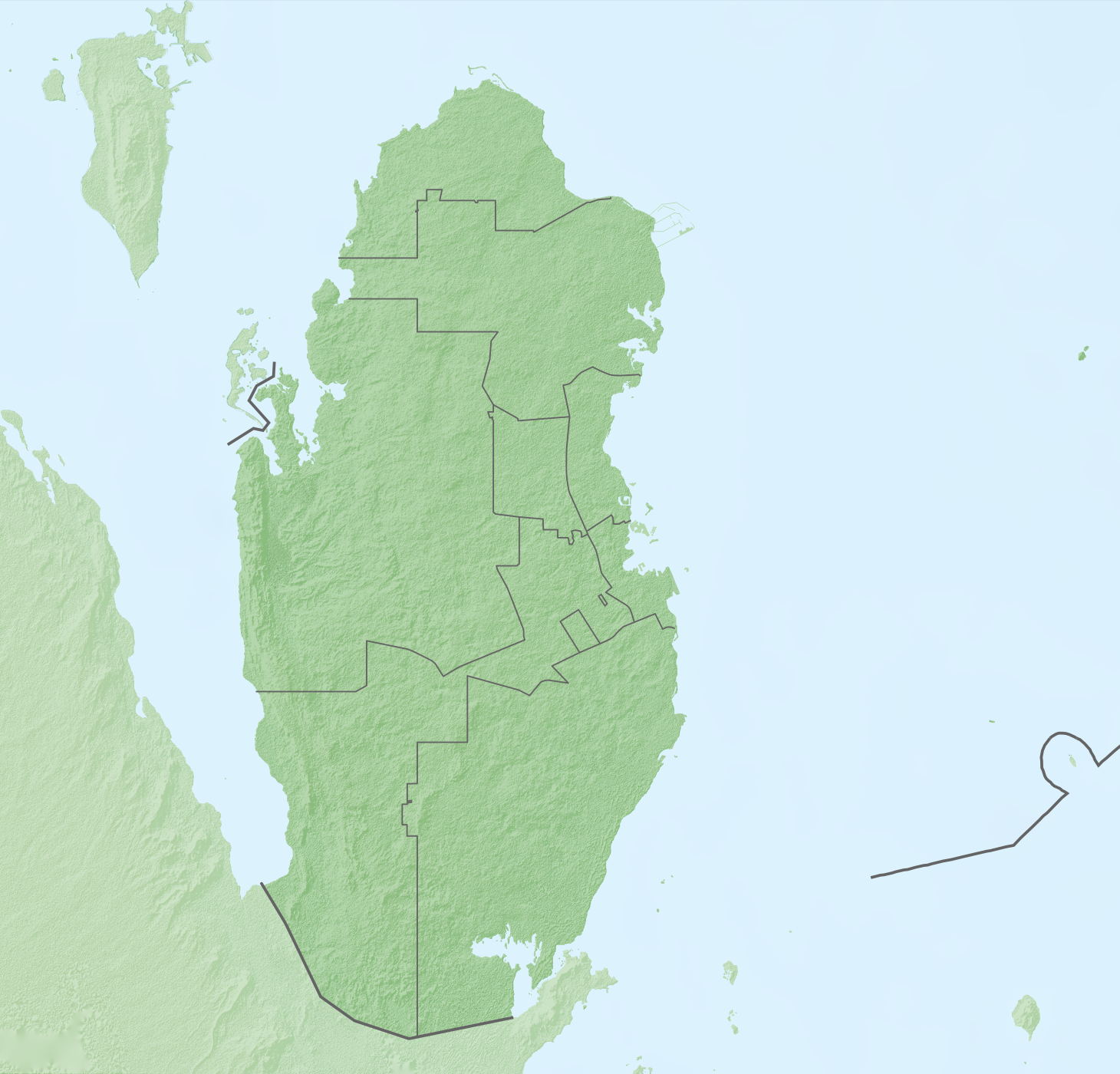
- Location in Qatar Location in West Asia Doha (West and Central Asia)
- Coordinates: 25°17′12″N 51°32′0″E
- Country: Qatar
- Municipality: Doha
- Established: 1825

Area
  - City proper: 132 km^{2} (51 sq mi)

Population (2020)
  - City proper: 1,186,023
  - Density: 8,990/km^{2} (23,300/sq mi)
  - Metro: 2,000,000
- Time zone: UTC+3 (AST)
- ISO 3166 code: QA-DA

Doha (Note: /ˈdoʊhɑː/; Arabic: الدوحة, romanized: ad-Dawḥah [ædˈdæwħæh, -ˈdoː-]) is the capital and largest city, and main financial hub of Qatar. Located on the Persian Gulf coast in the east of the country, north of Al Wakrah and south of Al Khor and Lusail, it is home to most of the country's population. It is also Qatar's fastest growing city and over 80% of the nation's population live in Doha or its surrounding suburbs, which are known collectively as the Doha Metropolitan Area.

Doha was founded in the 1820s as an offshoot of Al Bidda. It was officially declared as the country's capital in 1971, when Qatar gained independence from being a British protectorate. As the commercial capital of Qatar and one of the emergent financial centers in the Middle East, Doha is ranked "Beta+" on the Globalization and World Cities Research Network scale of "integration into the world city network". Metropolitan Doha includes parts of Al Rayyan such as Education City, an area devoted to research and education, and Hamad Medical City, an administrative area of medical care. It also includes Doha Sports City, or Aspire Zone, an international sports destination that includes Khalifa International Stadium, Hamad Aquatic Centre and the Aspire Dome.

The city was host to the first ministerial-level meeting of the Doha Development Round of World Trade Organization negotiations. It was also selected as host city of several sporting events, including the 2006 Asian Games, the 2011 Pan Arab Games, the 2019 World Beach Games, the 2024 World Aquatics Championships, the FIVB Volleyball Club World Championship, the WTA Finals and most of the games at the 2011 AFC Asian Cup. In December 2011, the World Petroleum Council held the 20th World Petroleum Conference in Doha. Additionally, the city hosted the 2012 UNFCCC Climate Negotiations, the 140th Inter-Parliamentary Union Assembly in 2019 and the 2022 FIFA World Cup. The city will host the 2027 FIBA Basketball World Cup.

== Etymology ==
According to the Ministry of Municipality and Environment of Qatar, the name "Doha" originated from the Arabic term dohat, meaning "roundness"—a reference to the rounded bays surrounding the area's coastline.

== History ==
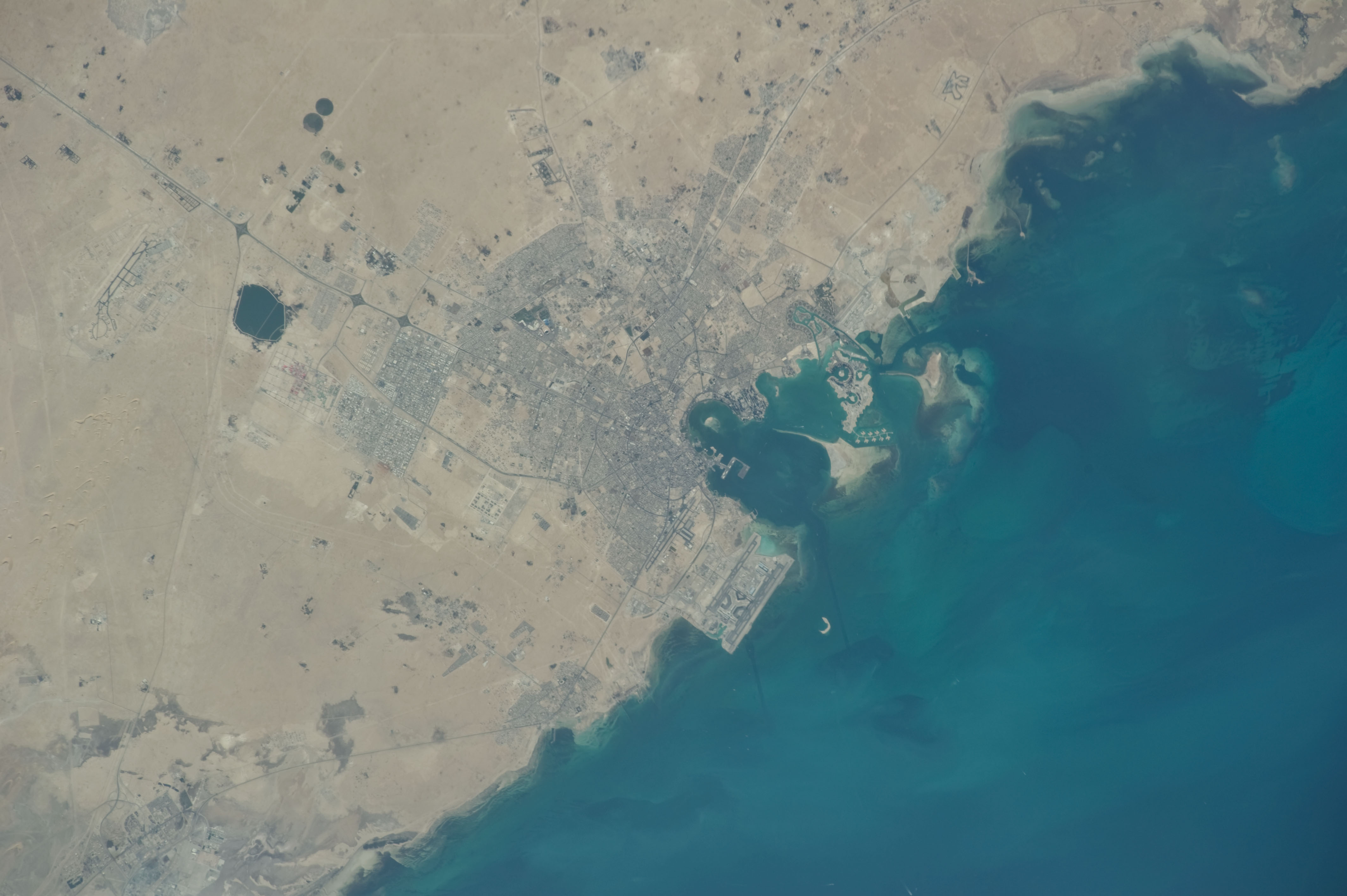
A satellite view of Doha on the East coast of Qatar. As with most world cities, Doha developed on the waterfront. Established in today's Souq Waqif area, it spread out gradually in a radial pattern with ring roads.

=== Establishment of Al Bidda ===
The city of Doha was formed seceding from another local settlement known as Al Bidda. The earliest documented mention of Al Bidda was made in 1681 by the Carmelite Convent, in an account that chronicles several settlements in Qatar. In the record, the ruler and a fort in the confines of Al Bidda are alluded to. Carsten Niebuhr, a German explorer who visited the Arabian Peninsula, created one of the first maps to depict the settlement in 1765, in which he labelled it as 'Guttur'.

David Seaton, a British political resident in Muscat, wrote the first English record of Al Bidda in 1801. He refers to the town as 'Bedih' and describes the geography and defensive structures in the area. He stated that the town had recently been settled by the Sudan tribe (singular Al-Suwaidi), whom he considered to be pirates. Seaton attempted to bombard the town with his warship, but returned to Muscat upon finding that the waters were too shallow to position his warship within striking distance.

In 1820, British surveyor R. H. Colebrook, who visited Al Bidda, remarked on the recent depopulation of the town. He wrote:

Guttur – Or Ul Budee [Al‐Bidda], once a considerable town, is protected by two square Ghurries [forts] near the seashore; but containing no freshwater they are incapable of defense except against sudden incursions of Bedouins, another Ghurry is situated two miles inland and has fresh water with it. This could contain two hundred men. There are remaining at Ul Budee about 250 men, but the original inhabitants, who may be expected to return from Bahrein, will augment them to 900 or 1,000 men, and if the Doasir tribe, who frequent the place as divers, again settle in it, from 600 to 800 men.

The same year, an agreement known as the General Maritime Treaty was signed between the East India Company and the sheikhs of several Persian Gulf settlements (some of which were later known as the Trucial Coast). It acknowledged British authority in the Persian Gulf and sought to end piracy and the slave trade. Bahrain became a party to the treaty, and it was assumed that Qatar, perceived as a dependency of Bahrain by the British, was also a party to it. Qatar, however, was not asked to fly the prescribed Trucial flag. As punishment for alleged piracy committed by the inhabitants of Al Bidda and breach of the treaty, an East India Company vessel bombarded the town in 1821. They razed the town, forcing between 300 and 400 natives to flee and temporarily take shelter on the islands between Qatar and the Trucial Coast.

=== Formation of Doha ===
Doha was founded in the vicinity of Al Bidda sometime during the 1820s. In January 1823, the British political resident John MacLeod visited Al Bidda to meet with the ruler and initial founder of Doha, Buhur bin Jubrun, who was also the chief of the Al-Buainain tribe. MacLeod noted that Al Bidda was the only substantial trading port in the peninsula during this time. Following the founding of Doha, written records often conflated Al Bidda and Doha due to their extremely close proximity. Later that year, Lieutenant Guy and Lieutenant Brucks mapped and wrote a description of the two settlements. Despite being mapped as two separate entities, they were referred to under the collective name of Al Bidda in the written description.

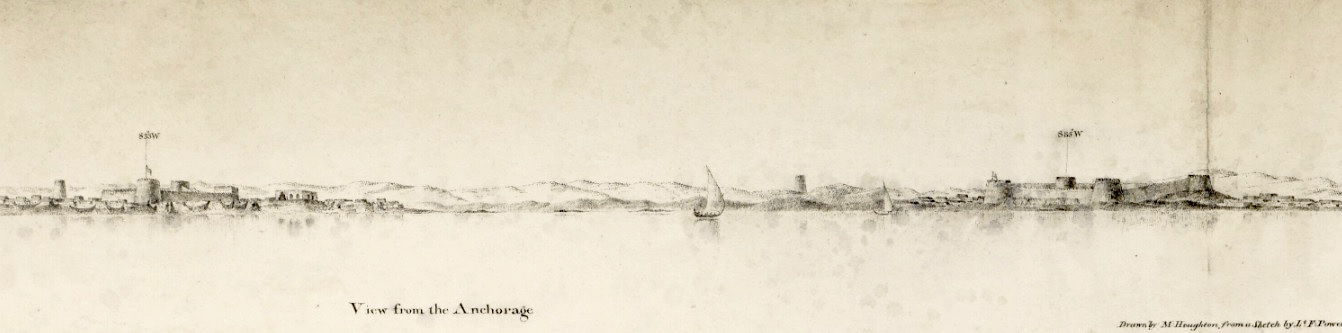
Al Bidda: view from the bay, 1823

In 1828, Mohammed bin Khamis, a prominent member of the Al-Buainain tribe and successor of Buhur bin Jubrun as chief of Al Bidda, was embroiled in controversy. He had murdered a native of Bahrain, prompting the Al Khalifa sheikh to imprison him. In response, the Al-Buainain tribe revolted, provoking the Al Khalifa to destroy the tribe's fort and evict them to Fuwayrit and Ar Ru'ays. This incident allowed the Al Khalifa additional jurisdiction over the town. With essentially no effective ruler, Al Bidda and Doha became a sanctuary for pirates and outlaws.

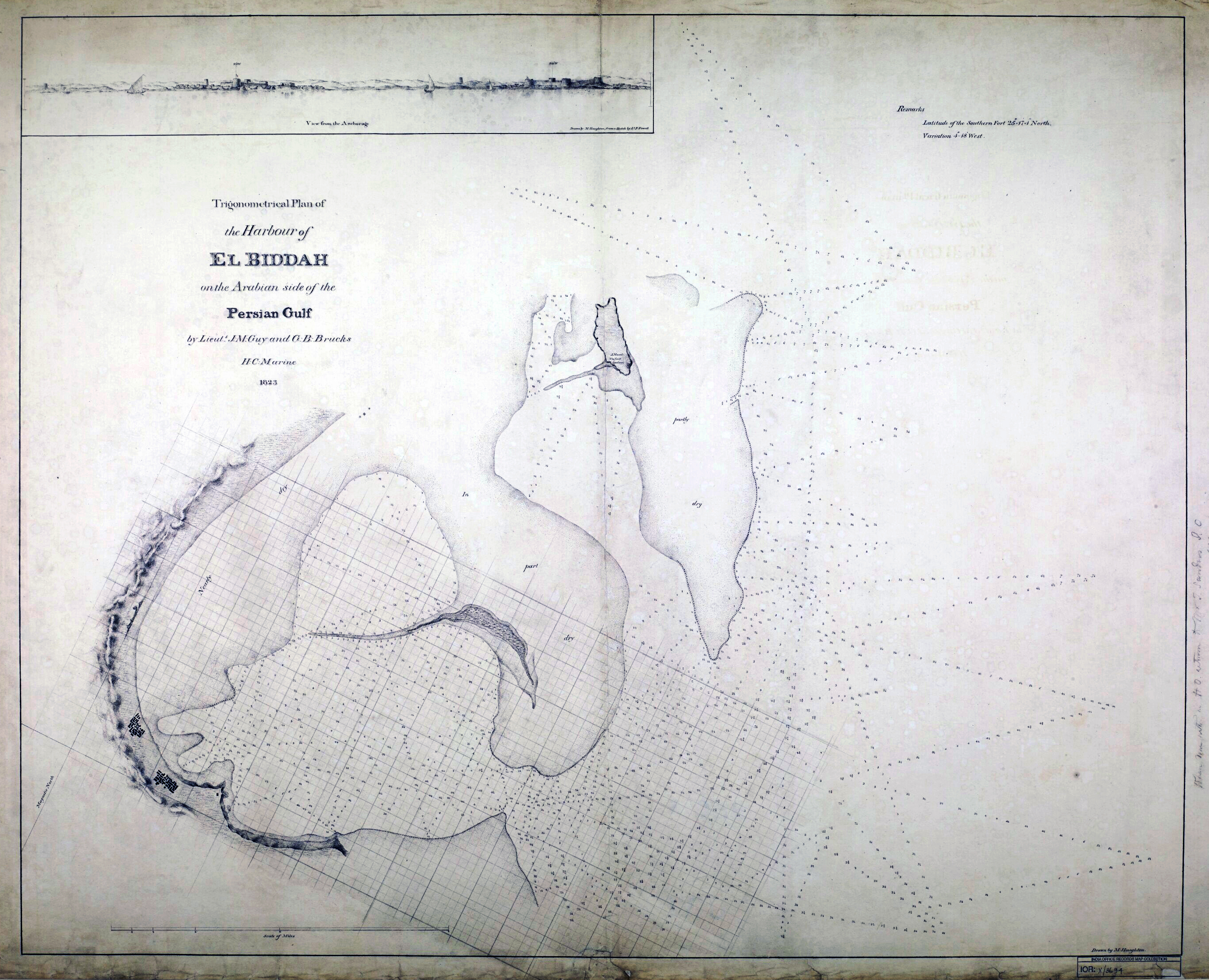
'Trigonometrical plan of the harbor of El Biddah on the Arabian side of the Persian Gulf', 1823

In November 1839, an outlaw from Abu Dhabi named Ghuleta took refuge in Al Bidda, evoking a harsh response from the British. A. H. Nott, a British naval commander, demanded that Salemin bin Nasir Al-Suwaidi, chief of the Sudan tribe (Suwaidi) in Al Bidda, take Ghuleta into custody and warned him of consequences in the case of non-compliance. Al-Suwaidi obliged the British request in February 1840 and also arrested the pirate Jasim bin Jabir and his associates. Despite the compliance, the British demanded a fine of 300 German krones in compensation for the damages incurred by pirates off the coast of Al Bidda; namely for the piracy committed by bin Jabir. In February 1841, British naval squadrons arrived in Al Bidda and ordered Al-Suwaidi to meet the British demand, threatening consequences if he declined. Al-Suwaidi ultimately declined on the basis that he was uninvolved in bin Jabir's actions. On 26 February, the British fired on Al Bidda, striking a fort and several houses. Al-Suwaidi then paid the fine in full following threats of further action by the British.

Isa bin Tarif, a powerful tribal chief from the Al Bin Ali tribe, moved to Doha in May 1843. He subsequently evicted the ruling Sudan tribe and installed the Al-Maadeed and Al-Kuwari tribes in positions of power. Bin Tarif had been loyal to the Al Khalifa, however, shortly after the swearing-in of a new ruler in Bahrain, bin Tarif grew increasingly suspicious of the ruling Al Khalifa and switched his allegiance to the deposed ruler of Bahrain, Abdullah bin Khalifa, whom he had previously assisted in deposing of. Bin Tarif died in the Battle of Fuwayrit against the ruling family of Bahrain in 1847.

=== Arrival of the House of Al Thani ===
The Al Thani family migrated to Doha from Fuwayrit shortly after Bin Tarif's death in 1847 under the leadership of Mohammed bin Thani. In the proceeding years, the Al Thani family assumed control of the town. At various times, they swapped allegiances between the two prevailing powers in the area: the Al Khalifa of Bahrain and the Saudis.

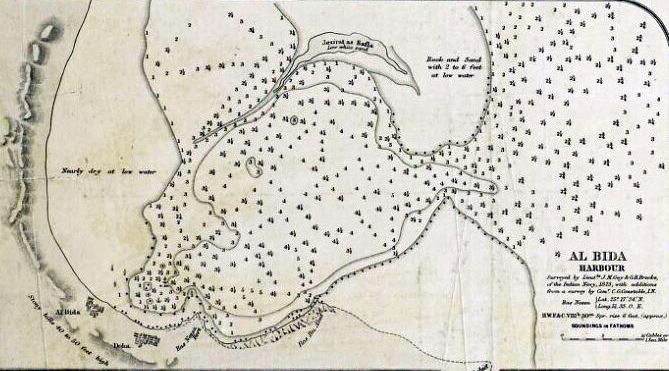
Plan of Al Bidda Harbour, drawn in 1860, indicating the principal settlements and landmarks

In 1867, many ships and troops were sent from Bahrain to assault the towns Al Wakrah and Doha over a series of disputes. Abu Dhabi joined on Bahrain's behalf due to the perception that Al Wakrah served as a refuge for fugitives from Oman. Later that year, the combined forces sacked the two Qatari towns with around 2,700 men in what came to be known as the Qatari–Bahraini War. A British record later stated that "the towns of Doha and Wakrah were, at the end of 1867 temporarily blotted out of existence, the houses being dismantled and the inhabitants deported".

The joint Bahraini-Abu Dhabi incursion and subsequent Qatari counterattack prompted the British political agent, Colonel Lewis Pelly, to impose a settlement in 1868. Pelly's mission to Bahrain and Qatar and the peace treaty that resulted were milestones in Qatar's history. It implicitly recognized Qatar as a distinct entity independent from Bahrain and explicitly acknowledged the position of Mohammed bin Thani as the main representative of the peninsula's tribes.

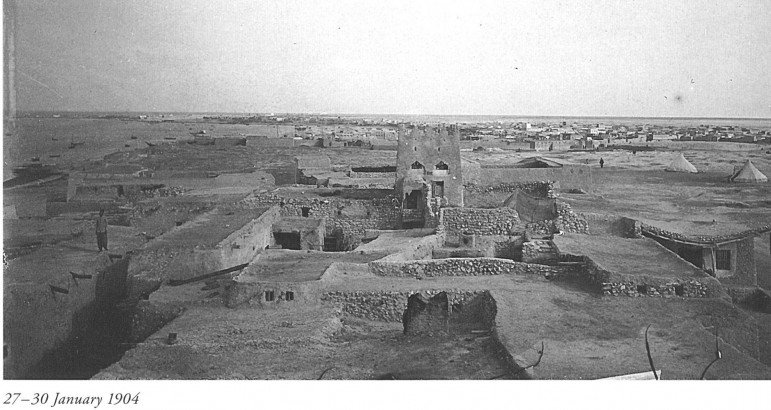
A part of Doha as seen in January 1904. Most of the development was low-rise and the use of locally available natural materials like rammed earth and palm fronds was common practice.

In December 1871, the Ottomans established a presence in the country with 100 of their troops occupying the Musallam fort in Doha. This was accepted by Mohammad bin Thani's son, Jassim Al Thani, who wished to protect Doha from Saudi incursions. The Ottoman commander, Major Ömer Bey, compiled a report on Al Bidda in January 1872, stating that it was an "administrative centre" with around 1,000 houses and 4,000 inhabitants.

Disagreement over tribute and interference in internal affairs arose, eventually leading to the Battle of Al Wajbah in March 1893. Al Bidda Fort served as the final point of retreat for Ottoman troops. While they were garrisoned in the fort, their corvette fired indiscriminately at the townspeople, killing many civilians. The Ottomans eventually surrendered after Jassim Al Thani's troops cut off the town's water supply. An Ottoman report compiled the same year reported that Al Bidda and Doha had a combined population of 6,000 inhabitants, jointly referring to both towns by the name of 'Katar'. Doha was classified as the eastern section of Katar. The Ottomans held a passive role in Qatar's politics from the 1890s onward until fully relinquishing control during the beginning of the First World War.

=== 20th century ===
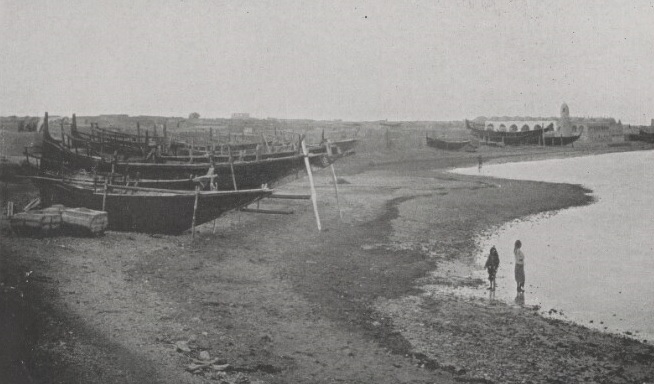
The city's coastline in 1904 largely highlights the local community which was based on fishing and pearl diving.

Pearling had come to play a pivotal commercial role in Doha by the 20th century. The population increased to around 12,000 inhabitants in the first half of the 20th century due to the flourishing pearl trade. A British political resident noted that should the supply of pearls drop, Qatar would 'practically cease to exist'. In 1907, the city accommodated 350 pearling boats with a combined crew size of 6,300 men. By this time, the average prices of pearls had more than doubled since 1877. The pearl market collapsed that year, forcing Jassim Al Thani to sell the country's pearl harvest at half its value. The aftermath of the collapse resulted in the establishment of the country's first custom house in Doha.

==== Lorimer report (1908) ====
British administrator and historian J. G. Lorimer authored an extensive handbook for British agents in the Persian Gulf entitled Gazetteer of the Persian Gulf in 1908. In it, he gives a comprehensive account of Doha at the time:

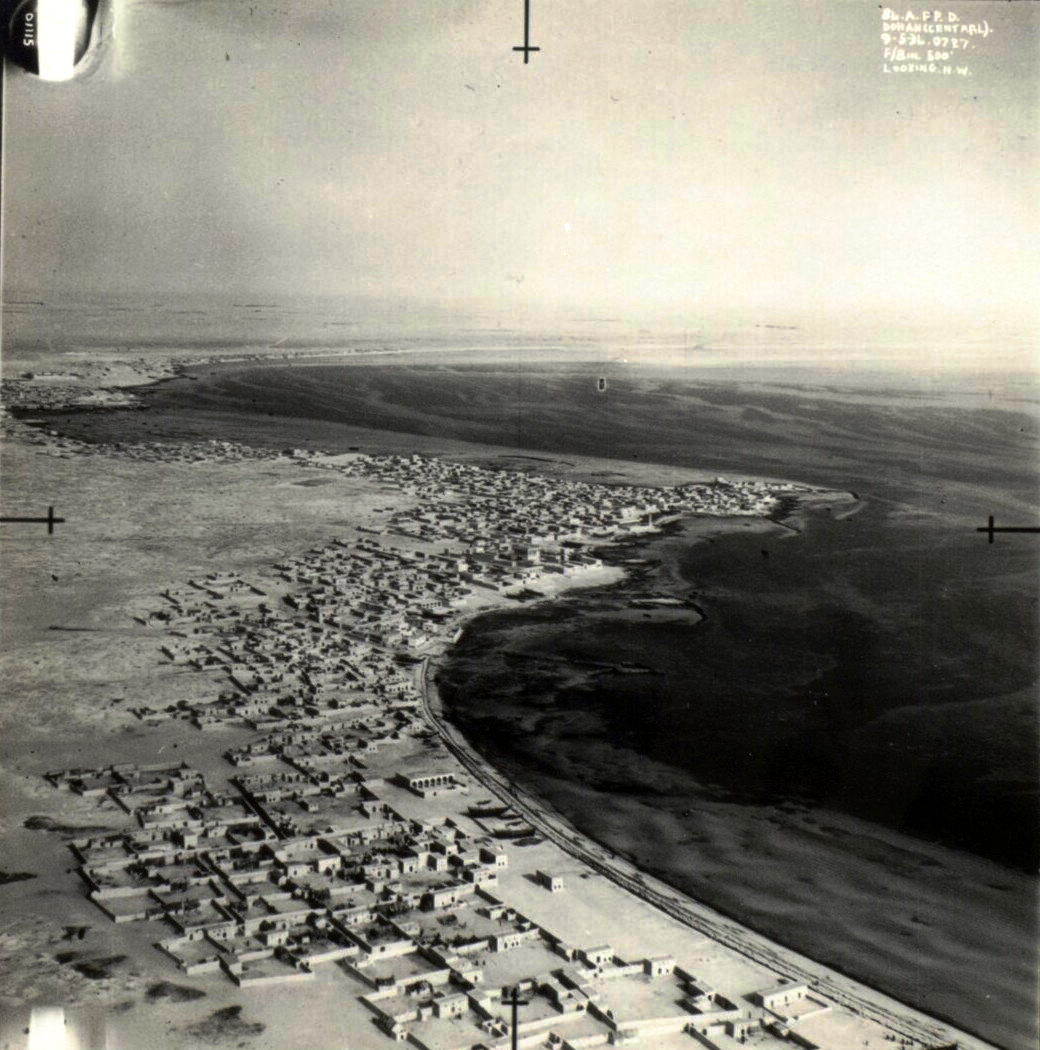
"Dohah looking northwest", photographed by the Royal Air Force during a reconnaissance of the Qatar Peninsula on 9 May 1934

Generally so styled at the present day, but Bedouins sometimes call it Dohat-al-Qatar, and it seems to have been formerly better known as Bida' (Anglice "Bidder"): it is the chief town of Qatar and is situated on the eastern side of that peninsula, about 63 miles south of its extremity at Ras Rakan and 45 miles north of Khor-al Odaid Harbour. Dohah stands on the south side of a deep bay at the south-western corner of a natural harbor which is about 3 miles in extent and is protected on the north-east and south-east sides by natural reefs. The entrance, less than a mile wide, is from the east between the points of the reefs; it is shallow and somewhat difficult, and vessels of more than 15 feet draught cannot pass. The soundings within the basin vary from 3 to 5 fathoms and are regular: the bottom is white mud or clay.

Townsite and quarters, — The south-eastern point of the bay are quite low but the land on the western side is stony desert 40 or 50 feet above the level of the sea. The town is built up the slope of some rising ground between these two extremes and consists of 9 Fanqs or quarters, which are given below in their order from the east to the west and north: the total frontage of the place upon the sea is nearly 2 miles.

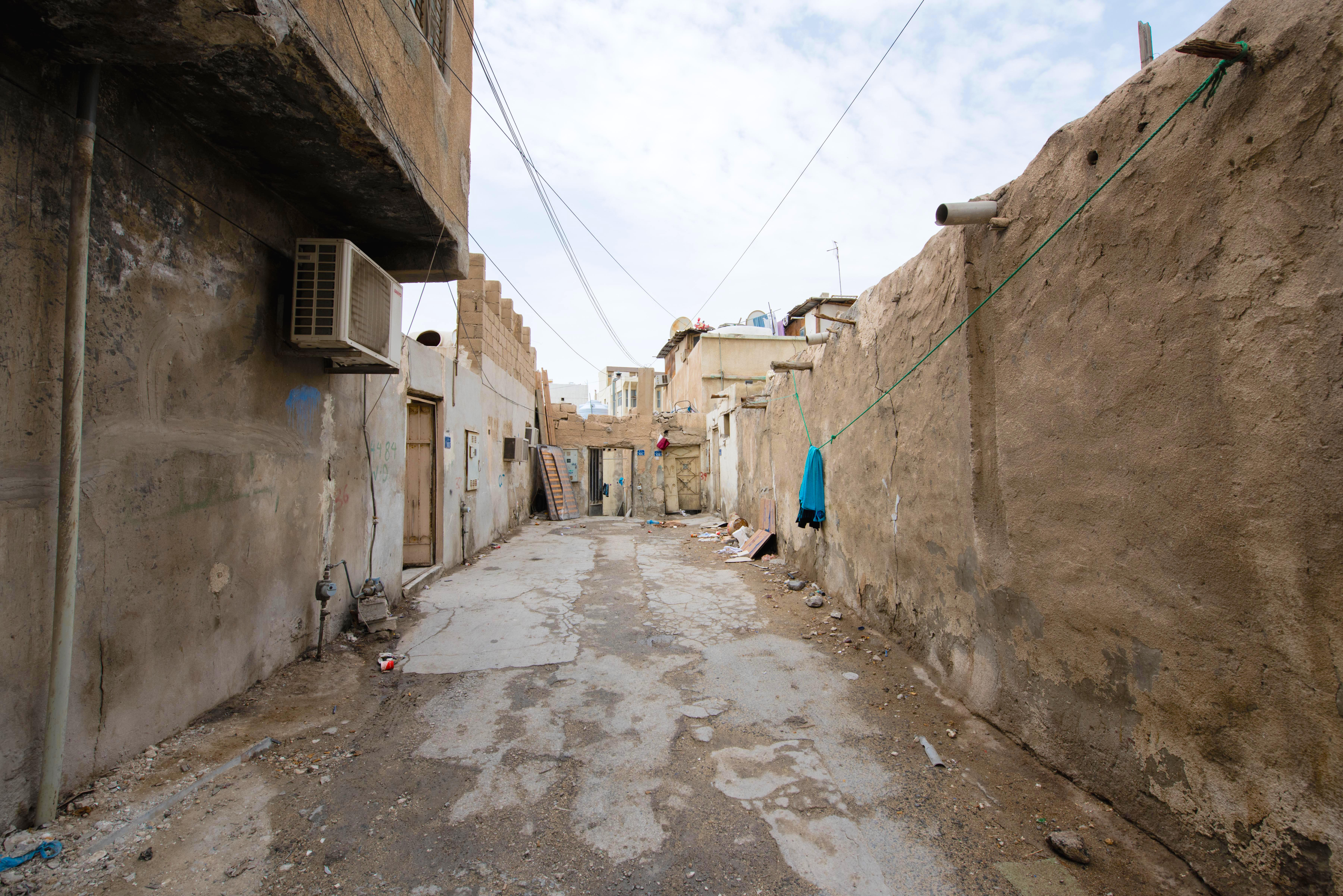
An old district in Doha, planned with narrow streets and rough plastered walls, give a glimpse of the city's past.

Lorimer goes on to list and describe the districts of Doha, which at the time included the still-existing districts of Al Mirqab, As Salatah, Al Bidda and Rumeilah. Remarking on Doha's appearance, he states:

The general appearance of Dohah is unattractive; the lanes are narrow and irregular the houses dingy and small. There are no date palms or other trees, and the only garden is a small one near the fort, kept up by the Turkish garrison.

As for Doha's population, Lorimer asserts that "the inhabitants of Dohah are estimated to amount, inclusive of the Turkish military garrison of 350 men, to about 12,000 souls". He qualified this statement with a tabulated overview of the various tribes and ethnic groups living in the town.

==== British protectorate (1916–1971) ====
In April 1913, the Ottomans agreed to a British request to withdraw all their troops from Qatar. Ottoman presence in the peninsula ceased, when in August 1915, the Ottoman fort in Al Bidda was evacuated shortly after the start of World War I. One year later, Qatar agreed to be a British protectorate with Doha as its official capital.

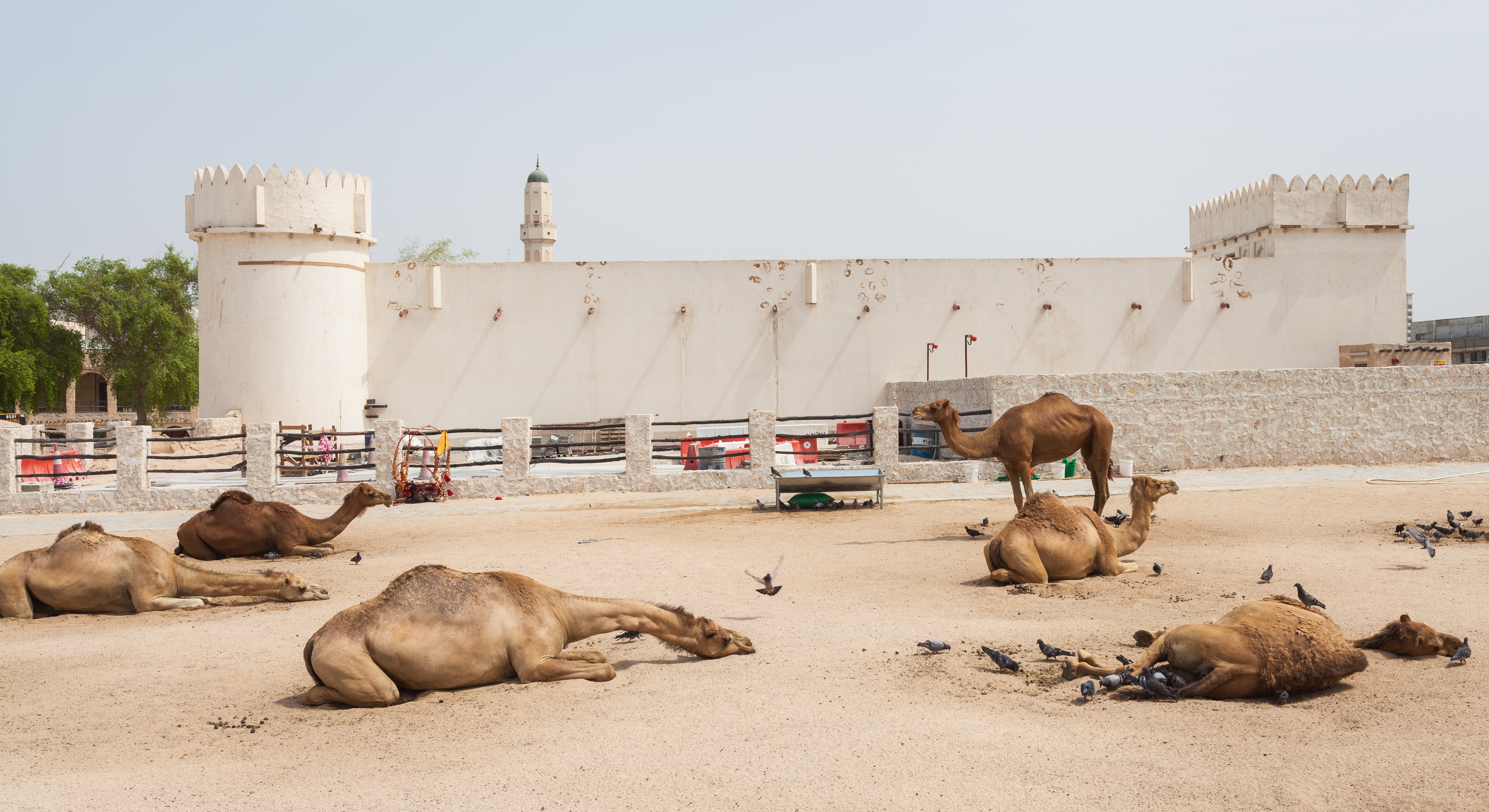
Camels next to Al Koot Fort, built in 1927, by Abdullah bin Jassim Al Thani

Buildings at the time were simple dwellings of one or two rooms, built from mud, stone, and coral. Oil concessions in the 1920s and 1930s, and subsequent oil drilling in 1939, heralded the beginning of slow economic and social progress in the country. However, revenues were somewhat diminished due to the devaluation of pearl trade in the Persian Gulf brought on by the introduction of the cultured pearl and the Great Depression. The collapse of the pearl trade caused a significant population drop throughout the country. It was not until the 1950s and 1960s that the country saw significant monetary returns from oil drilling.

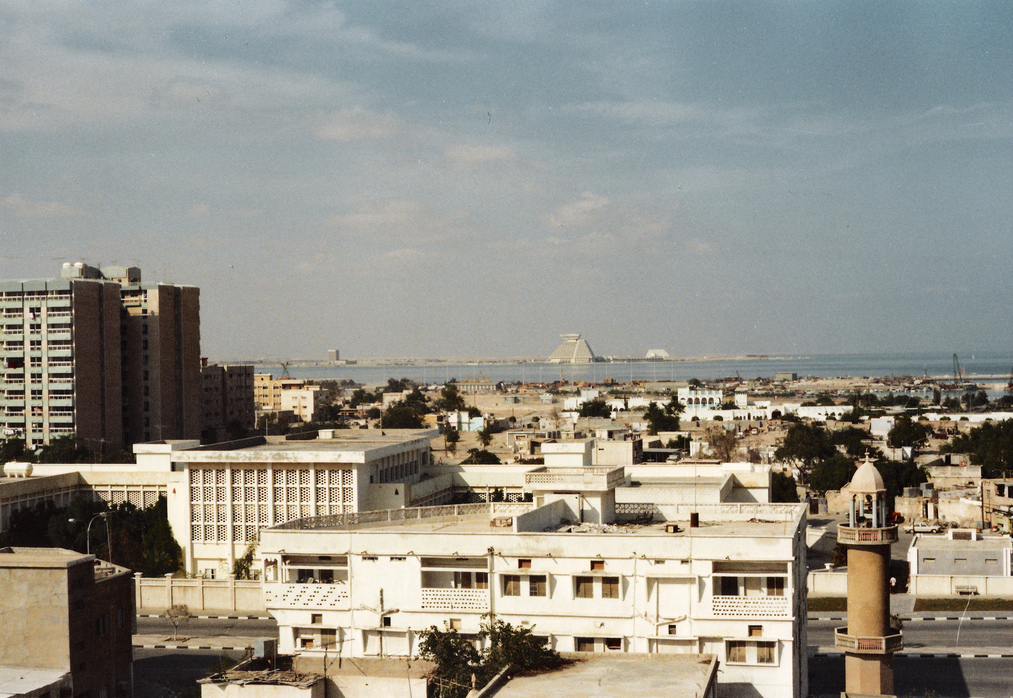
A view of Doha in the 1980s showing the Sheraton Hotel (pyramid-like building in the background) in West Bay without any of the high-rises around it

Qatar was not long in exploiting the new-found wealth from oil concessions, and slum areas were quickly razed to be replaced by more modern buildings. In 1950, British adviser to the Emir, Phillip L. Plant, initiated several municipal projects. Starting with remodeling the old complex of the Old Amiri Palace, Plant then initiated the construction of a seaside road about a half-mile in length which opened up and made accessible the half dozen jetties along Doha's most built-up section. The first formal boys' school was established in Doha in 1952, followed three years later by the establishment of a girls' school. Historically, Doha had been a commercial port of local significance. However, the shallow water of the bay prevented bigger ships from entering the port until the 1970s, when its deep-water port was completed. Further changes followed with extensive land reclamation, which led to the development of the crescent-shaped bay. From the 1950s to 1970s, the population of Doha grew from around 14,000 inhabitants to over 83,000, with foreign immigrants constituting about two-thirds of the overall population.

=== Post-independence ===
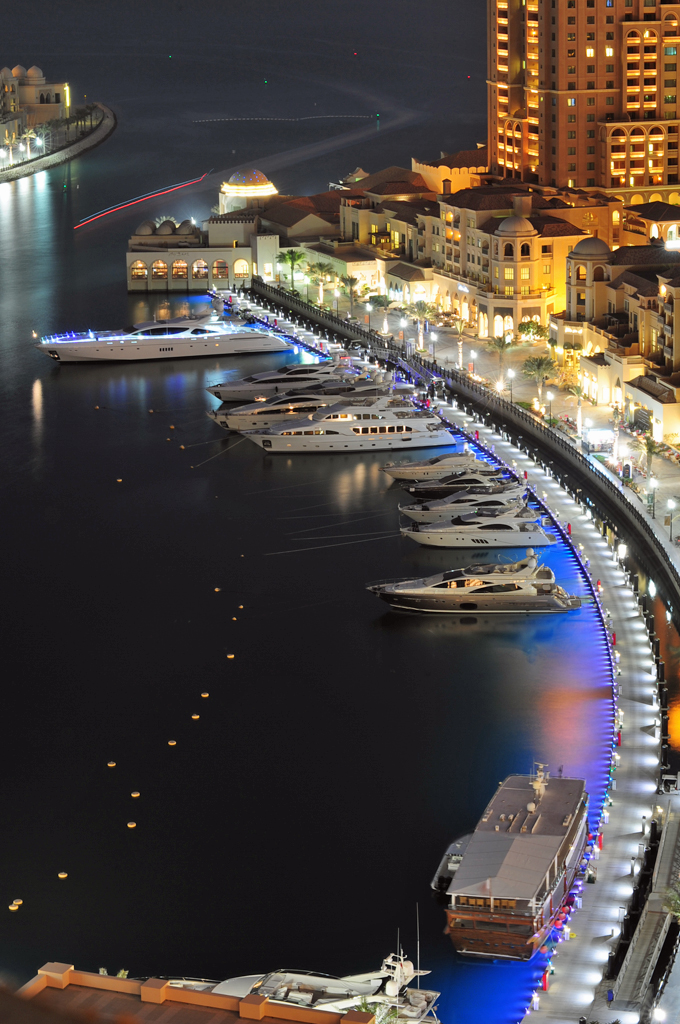
The Pearl-Qatar at night

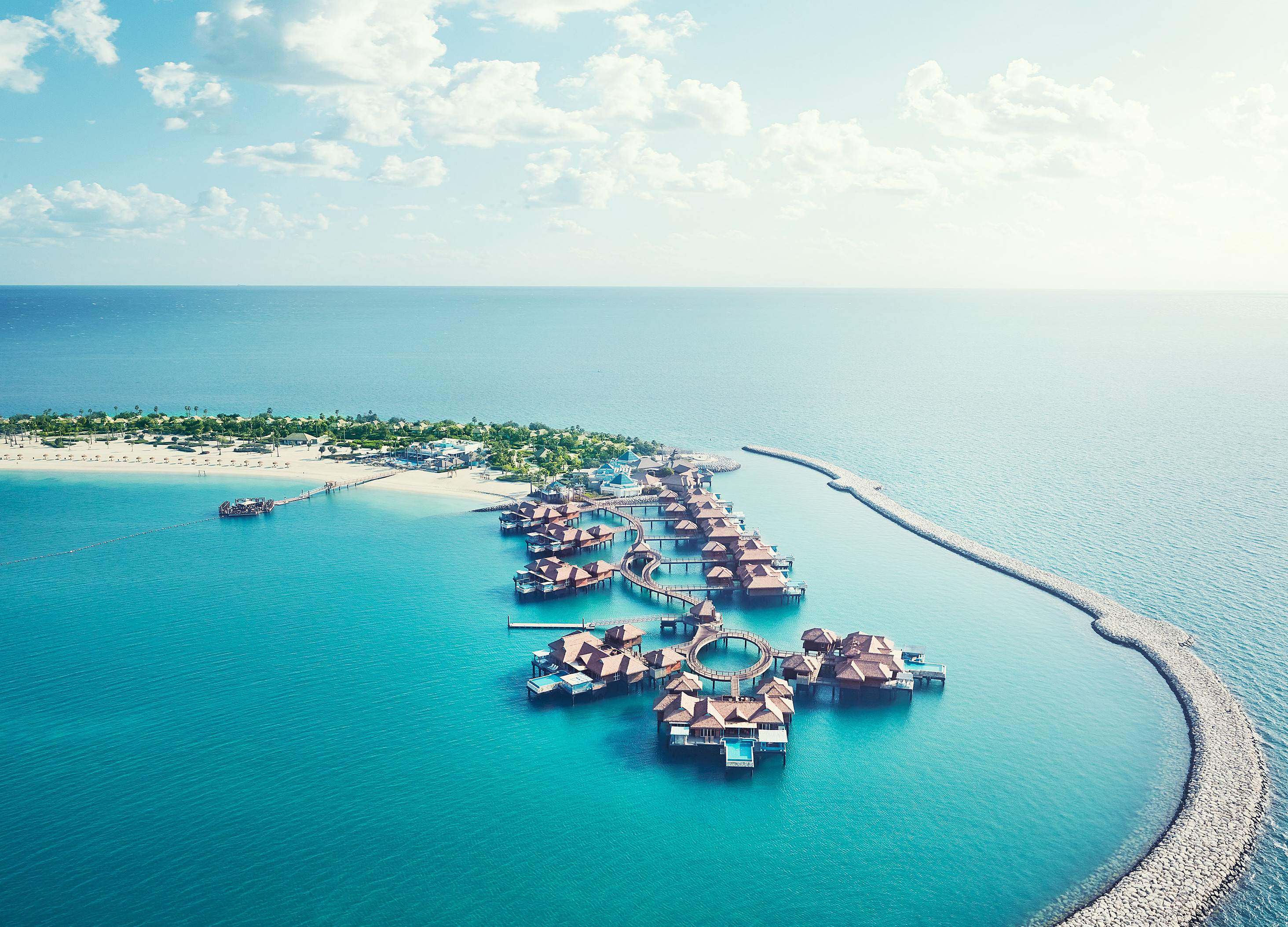
Banana Island is an artificial island measuring 13 hectares.

In April 1970, the first Qatari constitution was ratified under an Interim Basic Statute. This demanded that there be a formation of the first council of ministers, as well as a cabinet. The following year, Sheikh Khalifa bin Hamad Al Thani, the heir apparent, and prime minister dissolved the 1916 treaty, officially declaring Qatar as an independent state. In 1973, the University of Qatar was opened by emiri decree, and in 1975, the Qatar National Museum opened in what was originally the ruler's palace. During the 1970s, all old neighborhoods in Doha were razed and the inhabitants moved to new suburban developments, such as Al Rayyan, Madinat Khalifa and Al Gharafa. The Doha Metropolitan Area's population grew from 89,000 in the 1970s to over 434,000 in 1997. Additionally, land policies resulted in the total land area increasing to over 7,100 hectares (about 17,000 acres) by 1995, an increase from 130 hectares (1,600,000 sq yd; 320 acres) in the middle of the 20th century.

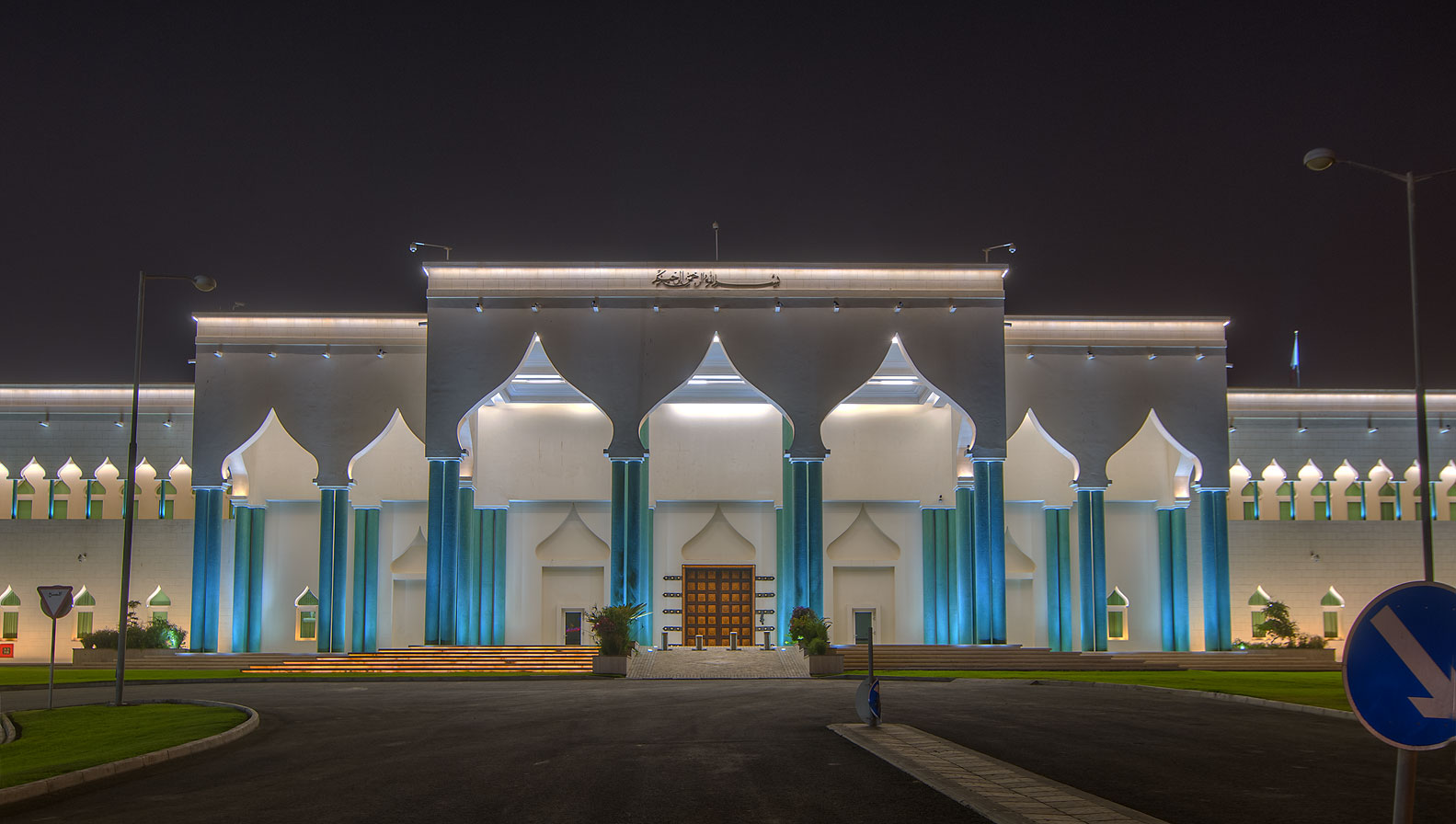
Amiri Diwan of the State of Qatar in Doha

In 1983, a hotel and conference center was developed at the north end of the Corniche. The 15-story Sheraton hotel structure in this center was the tallest structure in Doha until the 1990s. In 1993, the Qatar Open became the first major sports event to be hosted in the city. Two years later, Qatar stepped in to host the FIFA World Youth Championship, with all the matches being played in Doha-based stadiums.

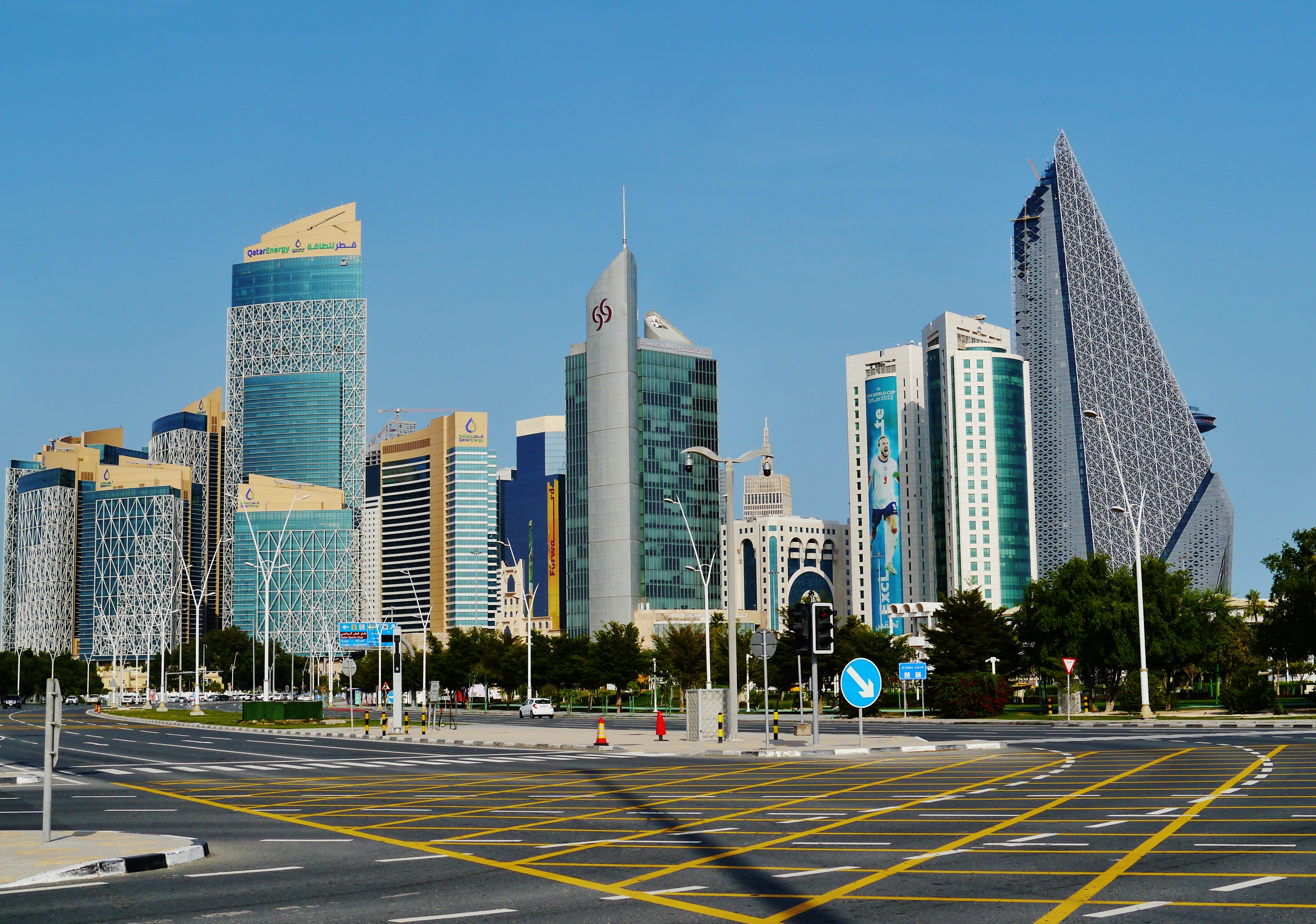
Developments in Doha's West Bay district have seen an increase in the population density of the area with the construction of several high-rises.

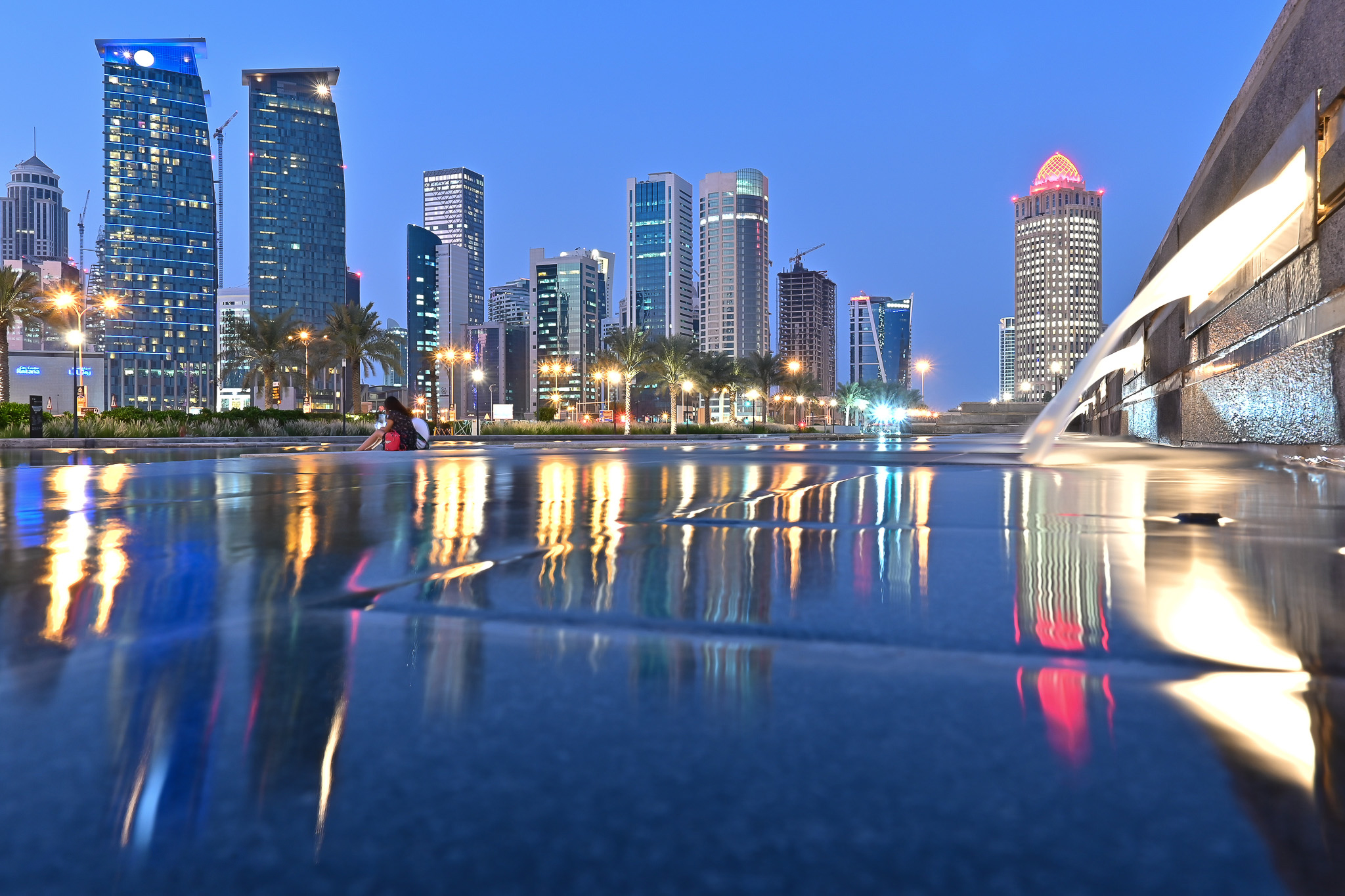
A view of a water feature in Sheraton Park with the West Bay skyline in the background

The Al Jazeera Arabic news channel began broadcasting from Doha in 1996. In the late 1990s, the government planned the construction of Education City, a 2,500 hectare Doha-based complex mainly for educational institutes. Since the start of the 21st century, Doha attained significant media attention due to the hosting of several global events and the inauguration of several architectural mega-projects. One of the largest projects launched by the government was The Pearl-Qatar, an artificial island off the coast of West Bay, which launched its first district in 2004. In 2006, Doha was selected to host the Asian Games, leading to the development of a 250-hectare sporting complex known as Aspire Zone. During this time, new cultural attractions were constructed in the city, with older ones being restored. In 2006, the government launched a restoration program to preserve Souq Waqif's architectural and historical identity. Parts constructed after the 1950s were demolished whereas older structures were refurbished. The restoration was completed in 2008. Katara Cultural Village was opened in the city in 2010 and has hosted the Doha Tribeca Film Festival since then.

The main outcome of the World Trade Organization Ministerial Conference of 2013 was the Trade Facilitation Agreement. The agreement aims to make it easier and cheaper to import and export by improving customs procedures and making rules more transparent. Reducing global trade costs by 1% would increase worldwide income by more than US$40 billion, 65% of which would go to developing countries. The gains from the Trade Facilitation Agreement are expected to be distributed among all countries and regions, with developing landlocked countries benefiting the most.

The Trade Facilitation Agreement will enter into force upon its ratification by 2/3 of WTO Members. The EU ratified the agreement in October 2015.

In Bali, WTO members also agreed on a series of Doha agriculture and development issues. Now modernizing the city while preserving traditions is part of the country's long-term plan, Qatar National Vision 2030.

On 9 September 2025, Israel carried out an airstrike in Doha, targeting a residential complex in the West Bay Lagoon district which housed senior Hamas negotiators in Doha, who were working on a ceasefire agreement with Israel to end the Gaza war. It was the first time that Israel launched a direct attack on one of the Gulf Cooperation Council members.

== Geography ==
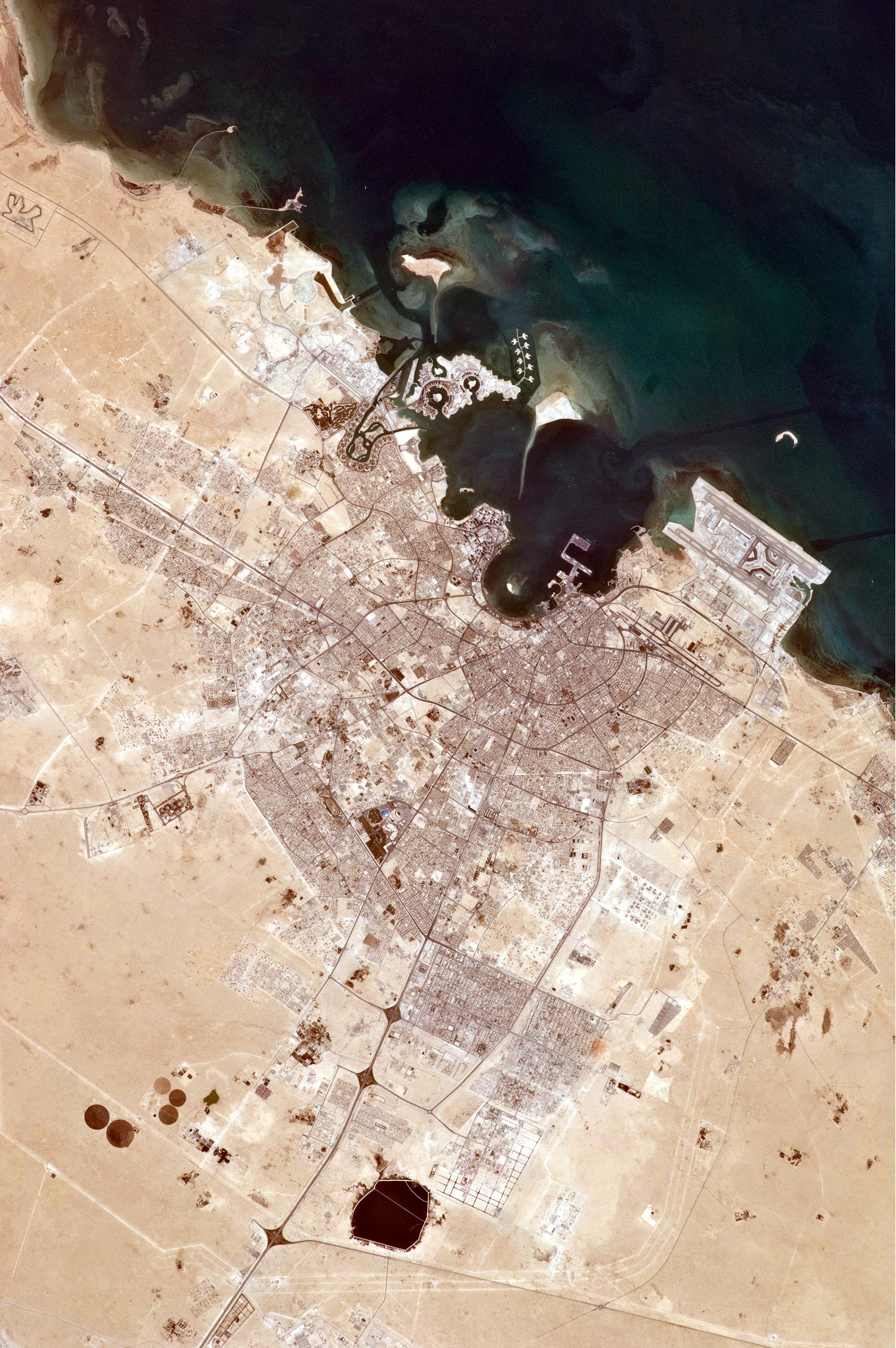
A view of Doha from the International Space Station in 2010 highlights the rapid development the city underwent since the discovery of oil in the 1960s.

=== Topography and geology ===
Doha is located on the central-east portion of Qatar, bordered by the Persian Gulf on its coast. Its elevation is 10 m (33 ft). Doha is highly urbanized. Land reclamation off the coast has added 400 hectares of land and 30 km (19 mi) of coastline. Half of the 22 km^{2} (8.5 sq mi) of surface area which Hamad International Airport was constructed on was reclaimed land. The geology of Doha is primarily composed of weathered unconformity on the top of the Eocene period Dammam Formation, forming dolomitic limestone.

=== Wildlife ===
Street cats, having first been introduced in the 1960s to deal with the country's rodent infestations, are now widespread in Doha, with government estimates putting the total population at between 2 million and 3 million. The Gulf sand gecko, having been first observed in Qatar on Doha's islands in 2013, is now also found on the promontory in coastal and saline places.

Common vegetation found in Doha include creeping sorrel (Oxalis corniculata) as a turf weed, winter cherry (Physalis angulata) as a weed, rye grass (Lolium rigidum) in cultivated areas, qurdi (Ochradenus baccatus) near roadsides, indigofera (Indigofera oblongifolia) near the central market area, curved hard grass (Parapholis incurva) near the coast, cat's tail (Typha domingensis) near moist areas, oat brome (Bromus danthoniae) near the Al Sadd area, and ndeewa (Cressa cretica).

Flowers of the sacred datura (Datura innoxia), crown daisy (Glebionis coronaria), wild chamomile (Matricaria chamomilla), and glandular speedwell (Veronica cymbalaria) have also been observed in rare instances, the latter as a weed. Herbs such as rabl (Plantago psyllium), which is found primarily near roadsides, and shih (Artemisia inculta) also occur infrequently.

Prosopis juliflora, a type of mesquite tree locally known as ghoweif and was once the only feature on Palm Tree Island. It was previously a popular tree cultivated around Qatar's urban areas, but this practice has stopped since 2005 and since then attempts have been made to eliminate traces of the tree, to varying degrees of success.

=== Islands and coast ===
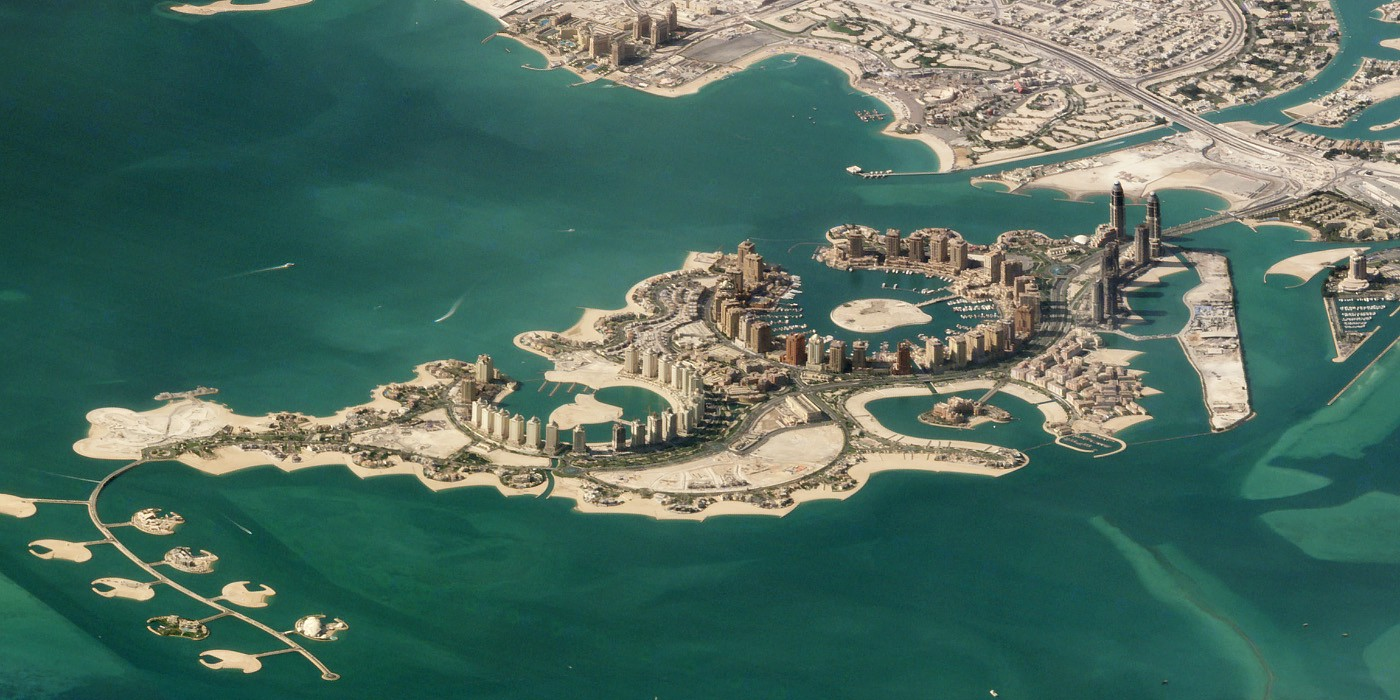
The Pearl is a purpose-built artificial island off the coast of Doha, connected to the mainland by a bridge.

The Pearl is an artificial island in Doha with a surface area of nearly 400 ha (1,000 acres) The total project has been estimated to cost $15 billion upon completion. Other islands off Doha's coast include Palm Tree Island, Shrao's Island, Al Safliya Island, and Al Aaliya Island.

In a 2010 survey of Doha's coastal waters conducted by the Qatar Statistics Authority, it was found that its maximum depth was 7.5 meters (25 ft) and minimum depth was 2 meters (6 ft 7 in). The waters had an average pH of 7.83, a salinity of 49.0 psu, an average temperature of 22.7 °C (72.9 °F) and 5.5 mg/L of dissolved oxygen.

=== Climate ===
Doha has a hot desert climate (Köppen climate classification BWh) with long, extremely hot summers and short, mild to warm winters. The average high temperatures between May and September surpass 38 °C (100 °F) and often approach 45 °C (113 °F). Humidity is usually the lowest in May and June. Dewpoints can surpass 30 °C (86 °F) in the summer. Throughout the summer, the city averages almost no precipitation, and less than 20 mm (0.79 in) during other months. Rainfall is scarce, at a total of 75 mm (2.95 in) per year, falling on isolated days mostly between October and March. The winter's days are relativity warm while the sun is up and cool during the night. The temperature rarely drops below 7 °C (45 °F). The highest temperature recorded in Doha and Qatar was 50.4 °C (122.7 °F) on 14 July 2010.

Climate data for Doha (1992–2021, extremes 1962–2013)
Month	Jan	Feb	Mar	Apr	May	Jun	Jul	Aug	Sep	Oct	Nov	Dec	Year
Record high °C (°F)	32.4 (90.3)	36.5 (97.7)	41.5 (106.7)	46.0 (114.8)	47.7 (117.9)	49.1 (120.4)	50.4 (122.7)	48.6 (119.5)	46.2 (115.2)	43.8 (110.8)	38.0 (100.4)	32.7 (90.9)	50.4 (122.7)
Mean daily maximum °C (°F)	22.6 (72.7)	24.0 (75.2)	27.7 (81.9)	33.2 (91.8)	39.4 (102.9)	42.2 (108.0)	42.4 (108.3)	41.4 (106.5)	39.2 (102.6)	35.6 (96.1)	29.7 (85.5)	24.8 (76.6)	33.5 (92.3)
Daily mean °C (°F)	18.3 (64.9)	19.4 (66.9)	22.6 (72.7)	27.4 (81.3)	33.7 (92.7)	36.4 (97.5)	37.4 (99.3)	36.6 (97.9)	34.5 (94.1)	31.0 (87.8)	25.4 (77.7)	20.6 (69.1)	28.6 (83.5)
Mean daily minimum °C (°F)	14.8 (58.6)	15.8 (60.4)	18.5 (65.3)	23.0 (73.4)	28.0 (82.4)	30.5 (86.9)	32.1 (89.8)	31.8 (89.2)	29.7 (85.5)	26.5 (79.7)	22.0 (71.6)	17.2 (63.0)	24.2 (75.5)
Record low °C (°F)	3.8 (38.8)	5.0 (41.0)	8.2 (46.8)	10.5 (50.9)	15.2 (59.4)	21.0 (69.8)	23.5 (74.3)	22.4 (72.3)	20.3 (68.5)	16.6 (61.9)	11.8 (53.2)	6.4 (43.5)	3.8 (38.8)
Average precipitation mm (inches)	11.2 (0.44)	10.6 (0.42)	17.1 (0.67)	6.0 (0.24)	1.2 (0.05)	0.0 (0.0)	0.0 (0.0)	0.0 (0.0)	0.0 (0.0)	2.8 (0.11)	10.8 (0.43)	17.6 (0.69)	77.3 (3.05)
Average relative humidity (%)	75	73	66	57	49	46	53	62	63	66	69	74	63
Average dew point °C (°F)	13.8 (56.8)	14.4 (57.9)	15.9 (60.6)	18.1 (64.6)	21.5 (70.7)	22.9 (73.2)	26.2 (79.2)	28.1 (82.6)	26.4 (79.5)	23.9 (75.0)	19.3 (66.7)	15.8 (60.4)	20.5 (68.9)
Mean monthly sunshine hours	244.9	234.5	248.0	267.0	325.5	345.0	331.7	328.6	306.0	303.8	270.0	248.0	3,453
Mean daily sunshine hours	7.9	8.3	8.0	8.9	10.5	11.5	10.7	10.6	10.2	9.8	9.0	8.0	9.5
Source: Qatar Meteorological Department (Climate Normals 1992–2021)

== Demographics ==
Historical population
Year	Pop.	±% p.a.
1820	250	—
1893	6,000	+4.45%
1970	80,000	+3.42%
1986	217,294	+6.44%
1998	264,009	+1.64%
2001	299,300	+4.27%
2004	339,847	+4.33%
2005	400,051	+17.72%
2010	796,947	+14.78%
2015	956,457	+3.72%
2020	1,186,023	+4.40%

Total population of the Doha Metropolitan Area
Year	Metro population
1997	434,000
2004	644,000
2008	998,651

A significant portion of Qatar's population lives within Doha and its metropolitan area. The district with the highest population density is the central area of Al Najada, which also accommodates the highest total population in the country. The population density across the greater Doha region ranges from 20,000 people per km^{2} to 25–50 people per km^{2}. Doha saw explosive growth rates in population in the first decade of the 21st century, absorbing the majority of the thousands of people then immigrating to Qatar every month. Doha's population is around one million, with the population of the city more than doubling from 2000 to 2010.

=== Ethnicity and languages ===
The population of Doha is overwhelmingly composed of expatriates, with Qatari nationals forming a minority. The largest portion of expatriates in Qatar are from South-East and South Asian countries, mainly India, Pakistan, Sri Lanka, Nepal, the Philippines, and Bangladesh with large numbers of expatriates also coming from the Levant Arab countries, Djibouti, Somalia, North Africa, and East Asia. Doha is also home to many expatriates from Europe, North America, South Africa and Australia.

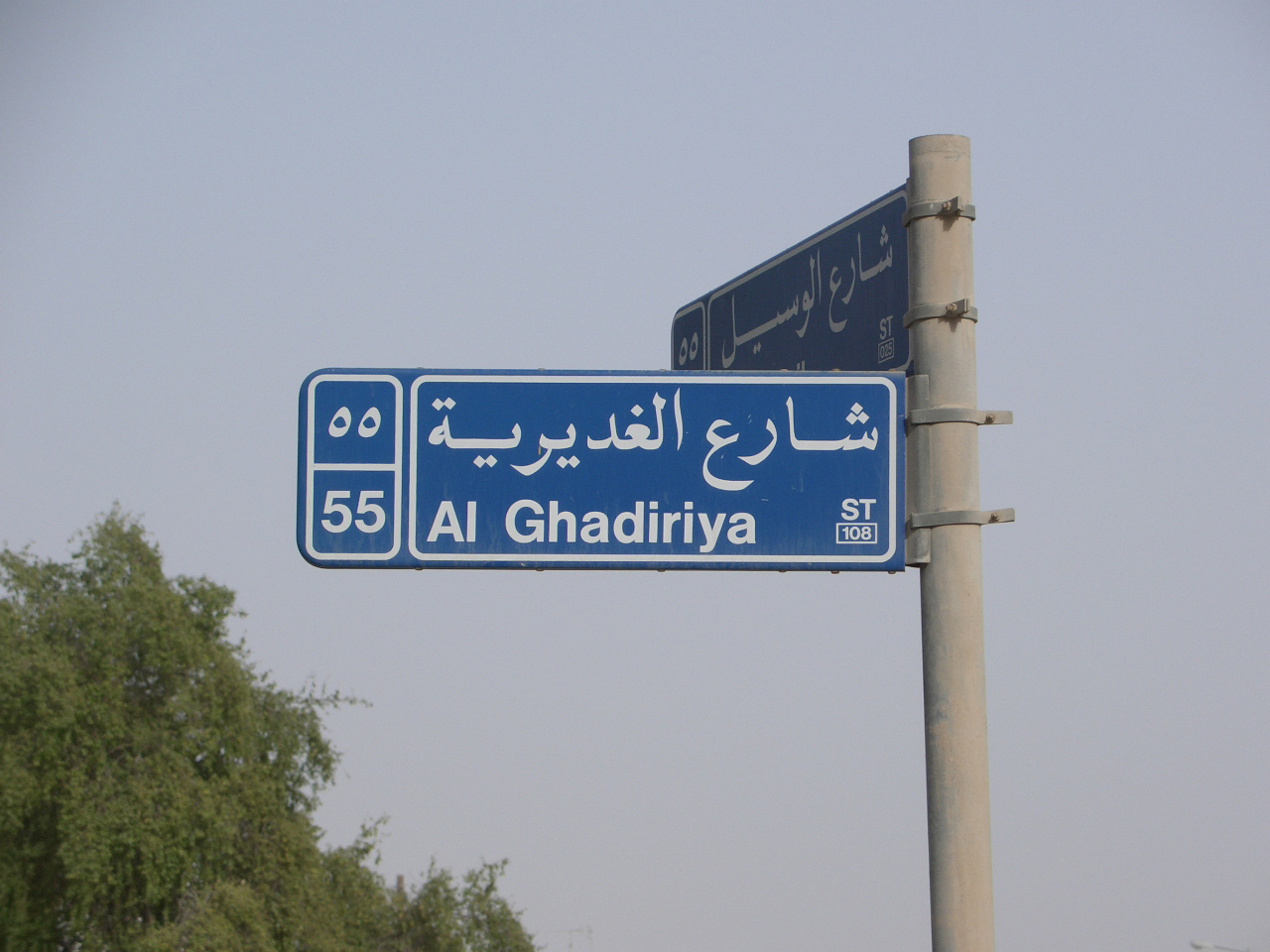
A typical bilingual traffic sign in Doha denotes the zone numbers, street names and street numbers of two perpendicular streets.

Arabic is the official language of Qatar. English is commonly used as a second language, and a rising lingua franca, especially in commerce. As there is a large expatriate population in Doha, languages such as Malayalam, Tamil, Bengali, Tagalog, Spanish, Sinhala, French, Urdu and Hindi are widely spoken.

Registered live births in Doha by nationality
Year	Qatari	Non-Qatari	Total
2001	2,080	3,619	5,699
2002	1,875	3,657	5,532
2003	2,172	4,027	6,199
2004	2,054	3,760	5,814
2005	1,767	3,899	5,666
2006	1,908	4,116	6,024
2007	1,913	4,708	6,621
2008	1,850	5,283	7,133
2009	2,141	5,979	8,120
2010	1,671	5,919	7,590
2011	1,859	6,580	8,439
2015	1,949	9,215	11,164
2020	4,005	15,381	19,386

In 2004, the Foreign Ownership of Real Estate Law was passed, permitting non-Qatari citizens to buy land in designated areas of Doha, including the West Bay Lagoon, the Qatar Pearl, and the new Lusail City. Prior to this, expatriates were prohibited from owning land in Qatar. Ownership by foreigners in Qatar entitles them to a renewable residency permit, which allows them to live and work in Qatar.

=== Religion ===
The majority of residents in Doha are Muslim. A majority of mosques are either Salafi or Sunni-oriented.

Catholics account for over 90% of the 150,000 Christian population in Doha. Following decrees by the Emir for the allocation of land to churches, the first Catholic church, Our Lady of the Rosary, was opened in Doha in March 2008. The church structure is discreet and Christian symbols are not displayed on the outside of the building. Several other churches exist in Doha, including the St.Isaac and St. George Greek Orthodox Church of Qatar, Doha, Qatar St.Isaac and St. George Greek Orthodox Church of Qatar the Syro-Malabar Church, Malankara Orthodox Church, Mar Thoma Church (affiliated with the Anglicans, but not part of the Communion), CSI Church, Syro-Malankara Church and a Pentecostal church.

== Administration ==
=== Districts ===
At the turn of the 20th century, Doha was divided into 9 main districts. In the 2010 census, there were more than 60 districts recorded in Doha Municipality. Some of the districts of Doha include:

Qatar's Central Bank is situated in the Al Souq district, close to the waterfront.

- Al Bidda (البدع)
- Al Dafna (الدفنة)
- Al Ghanim (الغانم)
- Al Markhiya (المرخية)
- Al Sadd (السد)
- Al Waab (الوعب)
- Bin Mahmoud (فريج بن محمود)
- Madinat Khalifa (مدينة خليفة)
- Musheireb (مشيرب)
- Najma (نجمه)
- Old Airport (المطار القديم)
- Qutaifiya (القطيفية)
- Ras Abu Aboud (راس أبو عبود)
- Rumeilah (الرميلة)
- Umm Ghuwailina (ام غو يلينه)
- West Bay (الخليج الغربي)

Some districts, such as As Salatah al Jadidah and Fereej Bin Mahmoud, essentially function as neighborhoods designated for particular tribes, as these tribes were the earliest to settle the area and were majority landholders. Shortly after Qatar gained independence, many of the districts of old Doha including Al Najada, Al Asmakh and Old Al Hitmi faced gradual decline and as a result, much of their historical architecture has been demolished. Instead, the government shifted their focus toward the Doha Bay area, which housed vital business districts such as Al Dafna and West Bay.

== Economy ==
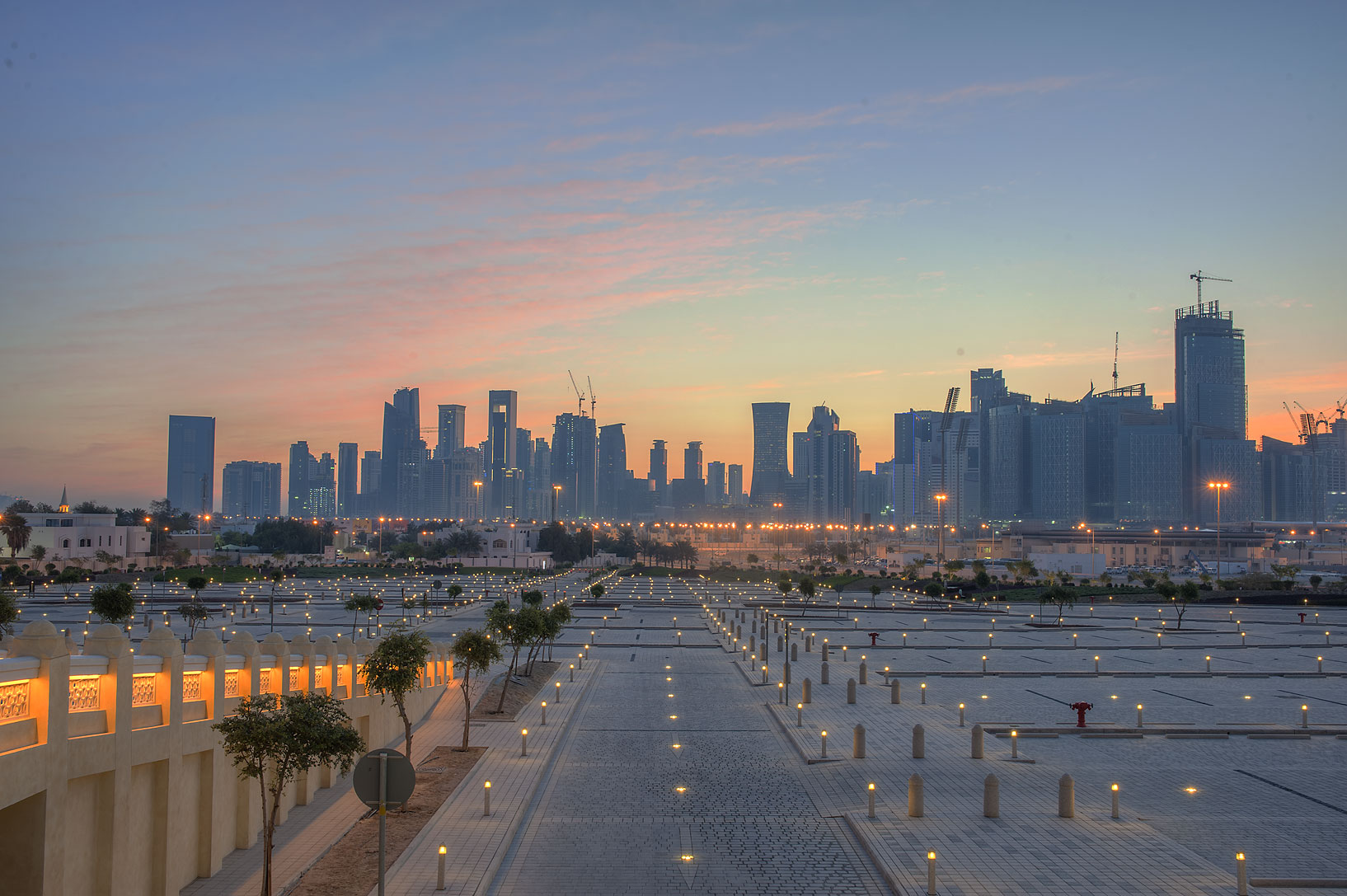
View of the city, with the Qatar petroleum district on the right

Doha is the economic center of Qatar. The city is the headquarters of numerous domestic and international organizations, including the country's largest oil and gas companies, QatarEnergy and QatarEnergy LNG. Doha's economy is built primarily on the revenue the country has made from its oil and natural gas industries. Doha was included in Fortune's 15 best new cities for business in 2011. Beginning in the late 20th century, the government launched numerous initiatives to diversify the country's economy to decrease its dependence on oil and gas resources. Doha International Airport was constructed in a bid to solidify the city's diversification into the tourism industry. This was replaced by Hamad International Airport in 2014. The new airport is almost twice the size of the former and features two of the longest runways in the world. Thirty-nine new hotels were under construction in the city in 2011.

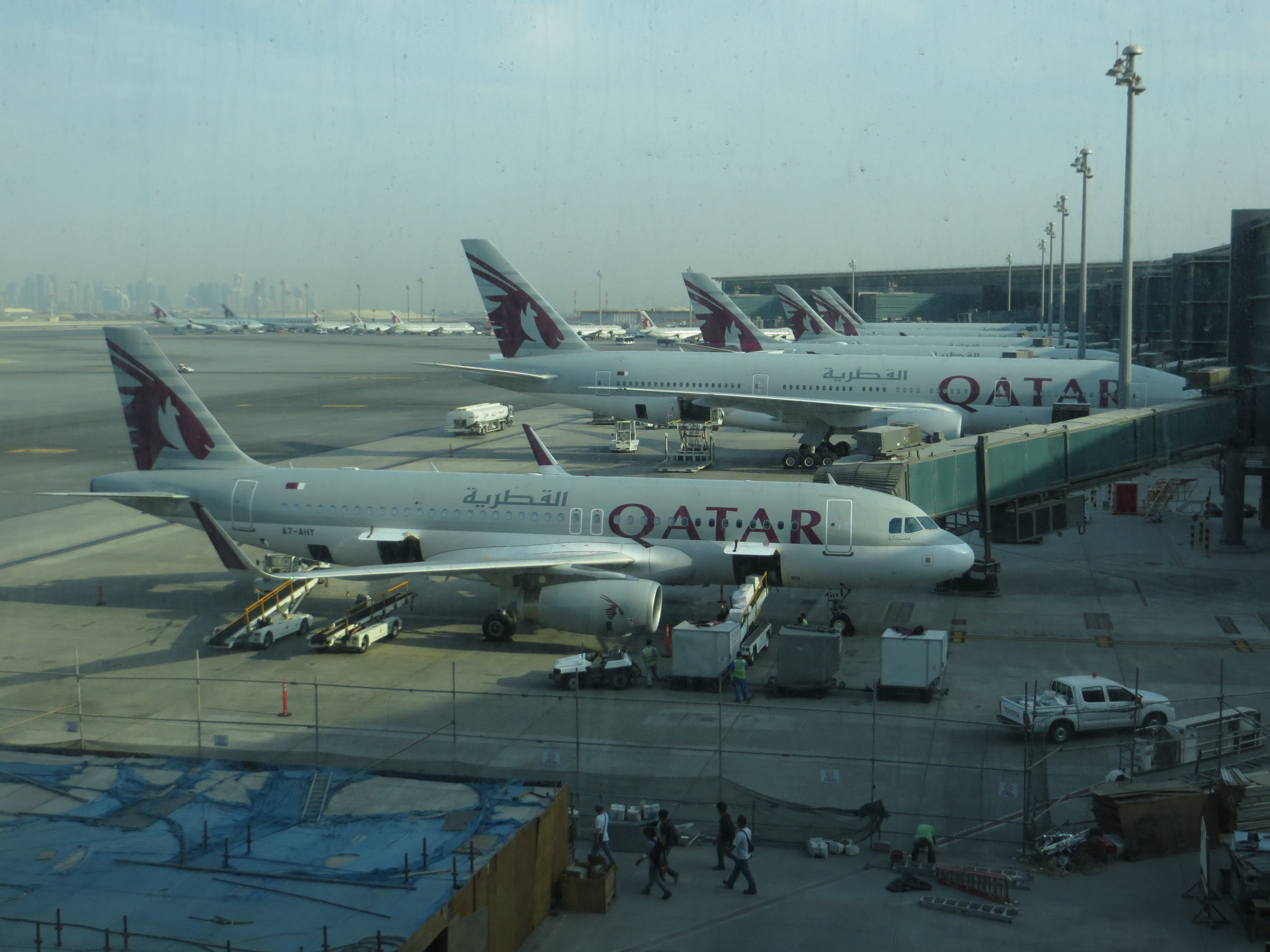
Qatar Airways aircraft on the apron of Hamad International Airport

As a result of Doha's rapid population boom and increased housing demands, real estate prices rose significantly through 2014. Real estate prices experienced a further spike after Qatar won the rights to host the 2022 FIFA World Cup. Al Asmakh, a Qatari real estate firm, released a report in 2014 which revealed substantial increases in real estate prices following a peak in 2008. Prices increased 5 to 10% in the first quarter of 2014 from the end of 2013. A 2015 study conducted by Numbeo, a crowd-sourced database, named Doha as the 10th most expensive city to live in globally. This rate of growth led to the development of planned communities in and around the city. Although the fall in oil prices since 2014 and a diplomatic crisis with Qatar's neighbors slowed growth in the city's population, government spending was increased to maintain the growth in real estate in metropolitan Doha.

Expatriate workers remitted $60bn between 2006 and 2012, with 54 percent of the workers' remittances of $60bn routed to Asian countries, followed by Arab nations that accounted for nearly half that volume (28 percent). India was the top destination of the remittances, followed by the Philippines, while the US, Egypt and the neighbouring UAE followed. Remittances in 2014 totaled $11.2 billion, amounting to 5.3% of Qatar's GDP.

=== Tourism and retail ===
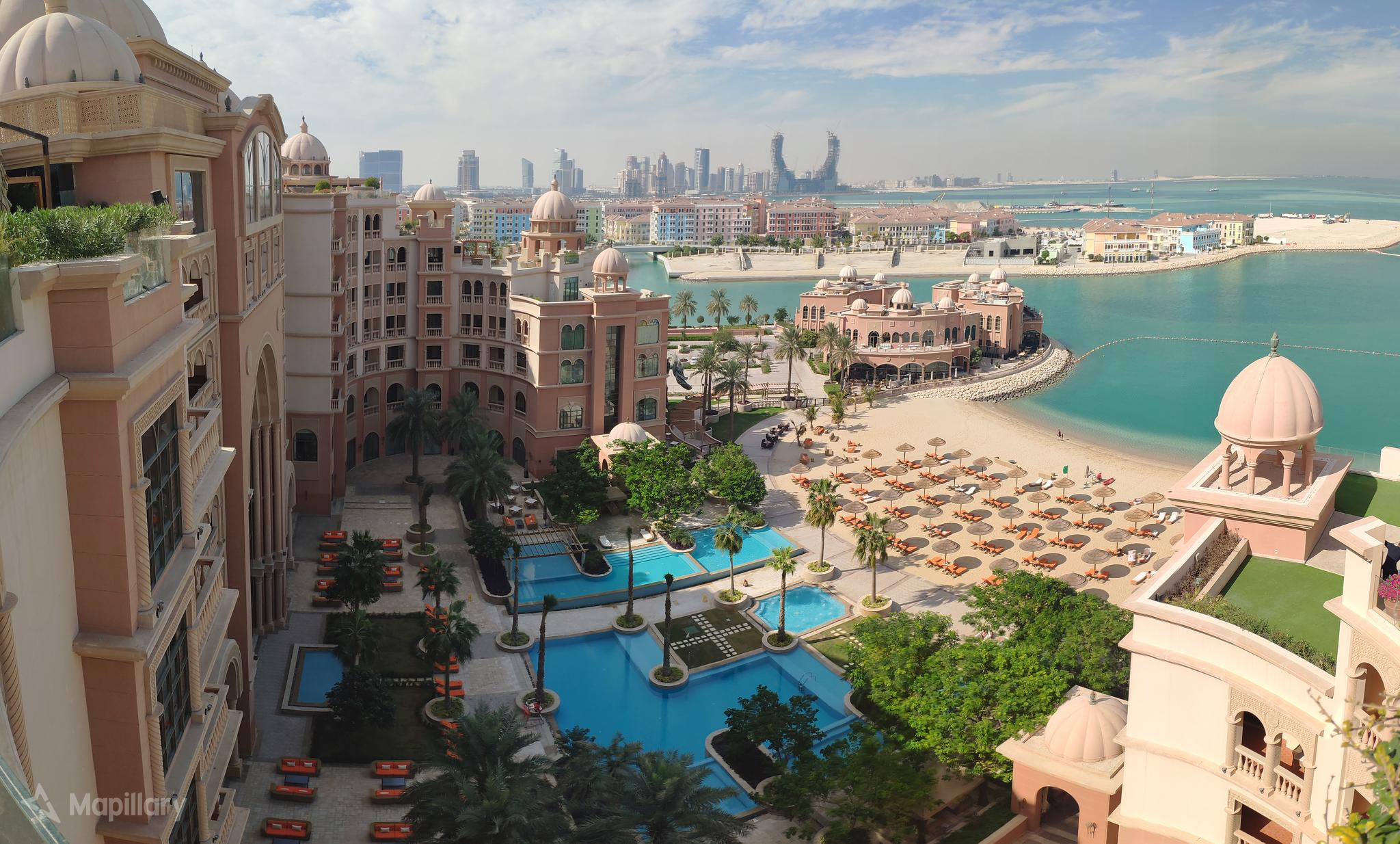
View from the Marsa Malaz Kempinski in The Pearl

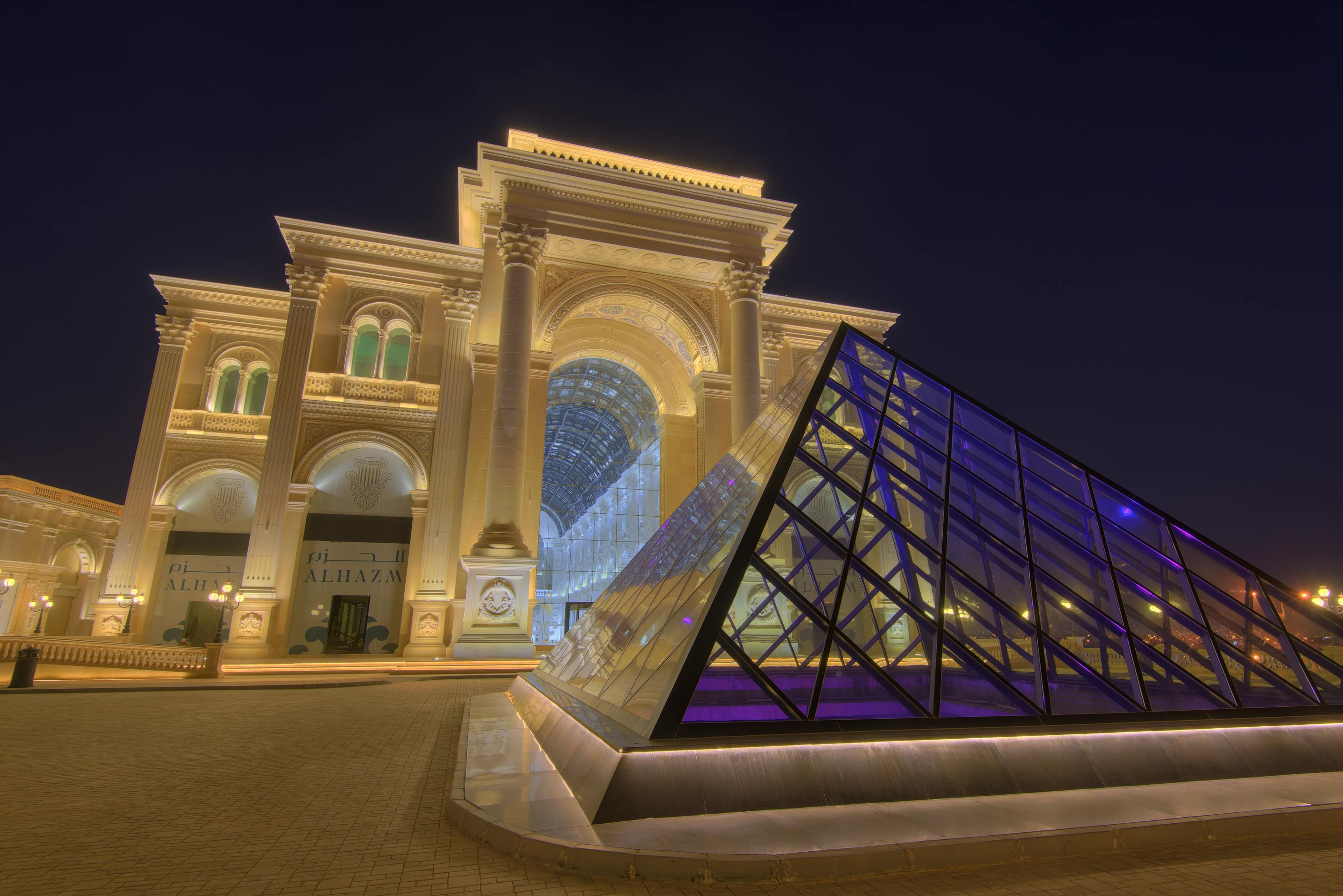
Al Hazm Mall

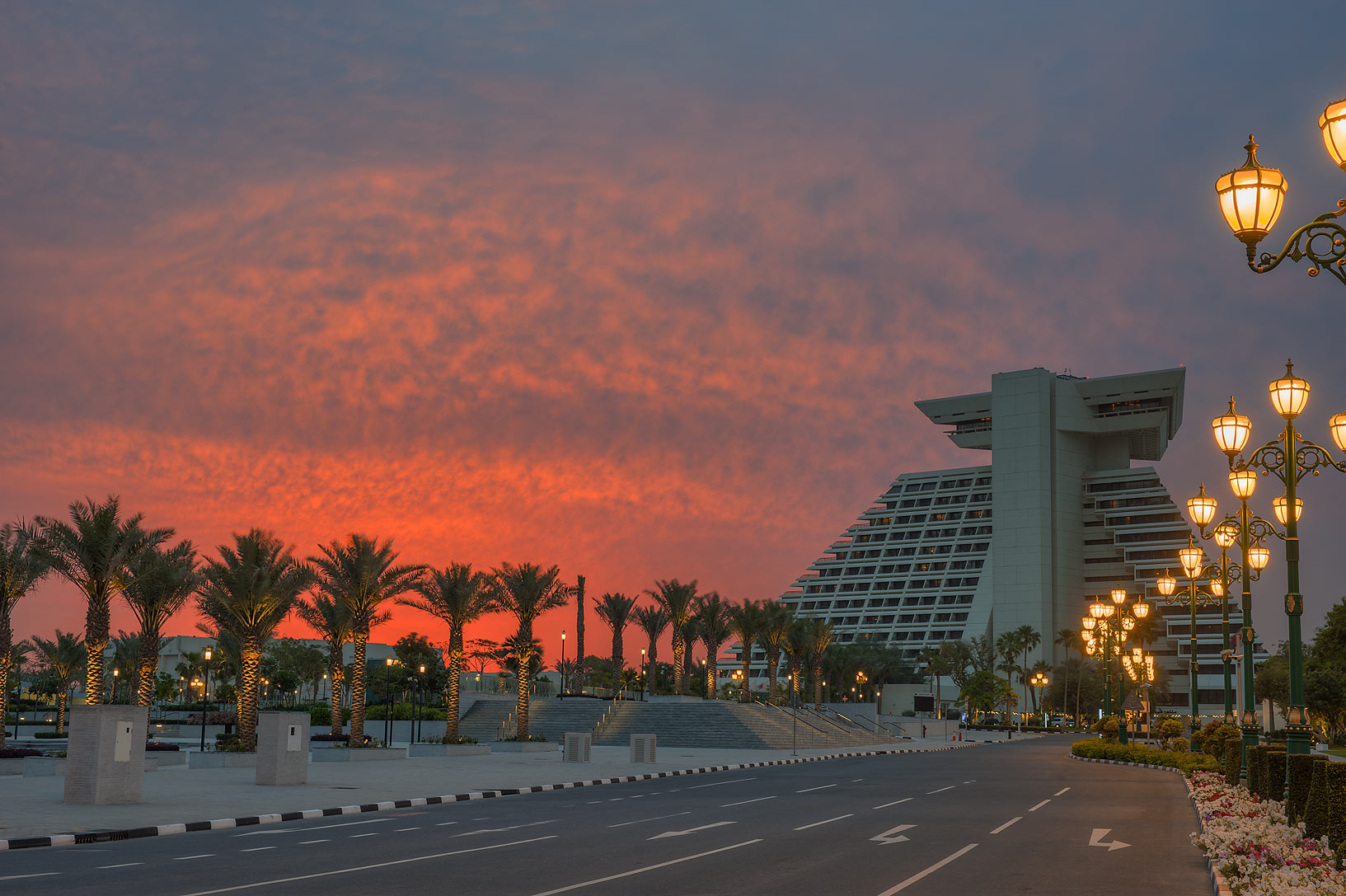
Sheraton Grand Doha Resort & Convention Hotel

Doha is considered as the most important tourist city in Qatar. Qatar's tourism sector is also a key focus of its economic diversification strategy. The country is investing in the development of new tourism infrastructure, such as hotels and resorts, and promoting its cultural attractions, such as the Museum of Islamic Art and the Katara Cultural Village to attract visitors from around the world. In addition, Qatar Airways has become one of the world's leading airlines, connecting the country to major cities across the globe. Qatar has also been attracting major international events to the country, such as the FIFA World Cup 2022, which attracted over about 1 million visitors over the course of the tournament. The tournament itself ultimately made up 0.7–1.0 percent of Qatar's 2022 GDP, with World Cup-related tourism and broadcasting revenue estimated at US$2.3–4.1 billion.

High and rising incomes in Qatar offer significant opportunities in culinary establishments and retail sectors. Premium and healthy brands are especially well received. Convenience food is also an increasingly important sector for younger Qataris and visitors. In recent years, Qatar has been taking steps to diversify its economy and reduce its reliance on oil and gas revenues. The country has launched several initiatives aimed at promoting non-oil sectors such as tourism, finance, and technology. For example, Qatar has invested heavily in building world-class infrastructure, including the Hamad International Airport and the Qatar Free Zones Authority, to attract foreign investors and businesses to set up shop in the country. Moreover, Qatar has also been working towards creating a more business-friendly environment by streamlining regulations and offering incentives to start-ups and small businesses. The country's ambition in this area can already be seen in developments like the recently completed M7 building in downtown Doha. This futuristic five-story construction is described as an epicentre for innovation and entrepreneurship in design, fashion, and technology. The latest research by the World Travel and Tourism Council (WTTC) which highlighted the top 10 cities where international travelers spent the most money in 2022, showed Doha at the number 2 spot with $16.8 billion. Qatar has received over 2.56 million visitors from January until 25 August 2023, exceeding the full year arrival figures from 2022, representing a 157 per cent increase over the same period last year, according to a report by Zawya citing figures released yesterday by Qatar Tourism (QT). Doha named Arab tourism capital for 2023. Non-GCC tourists made up 66% of all visitors in October, an increase of 10% from the previous month 2023. Doha in 2023 hosted International Horticultural Expo 2023. Spanning 1.7 million square meters, the event took place in Al Bidda Park, one of the biggest parks in Doha, which overlooks the Persian Gulf.

== Architecture ==
=== Traditional architecture ===
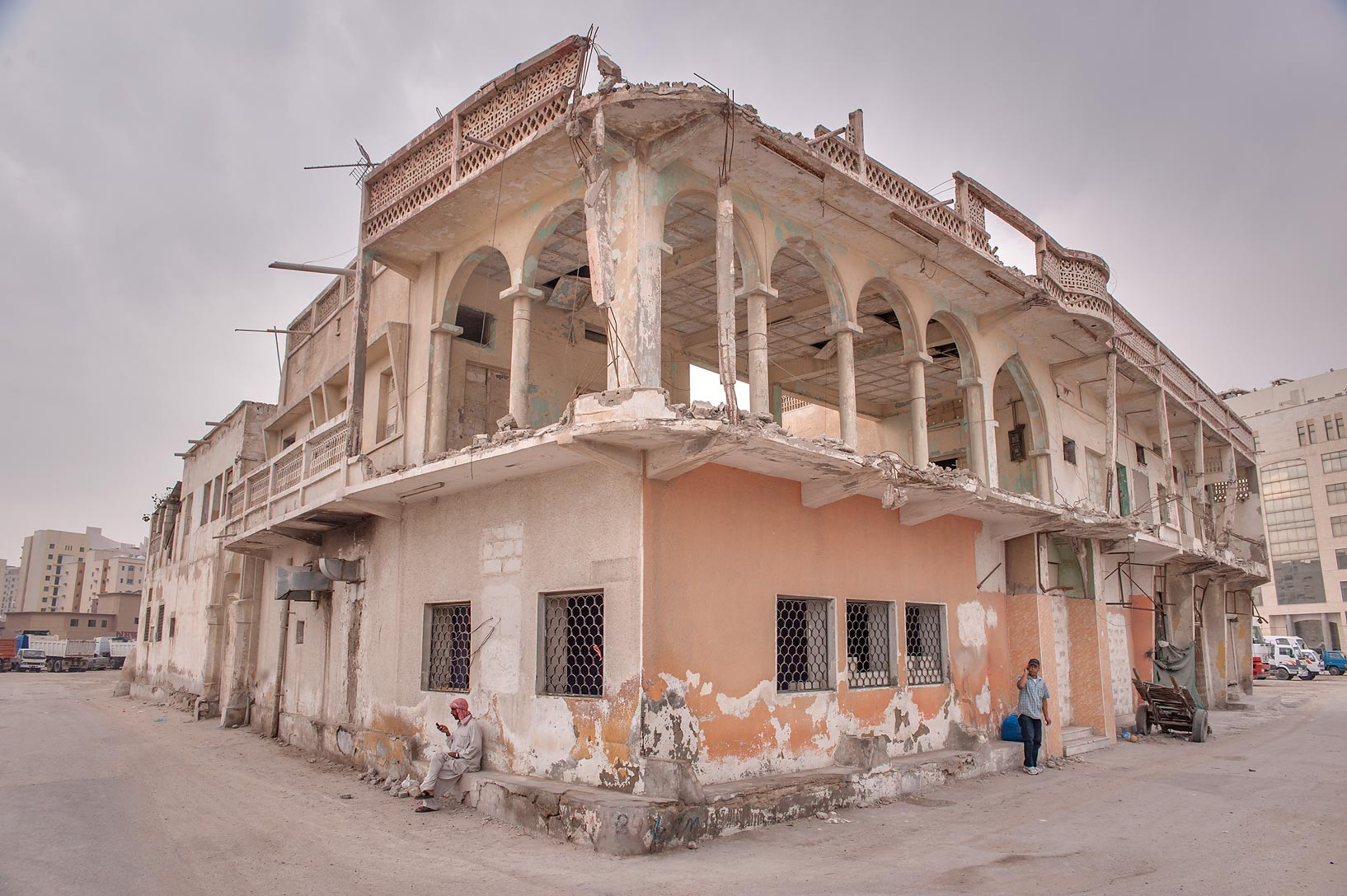
Historic arcaded house in the Old Al Ghanim district

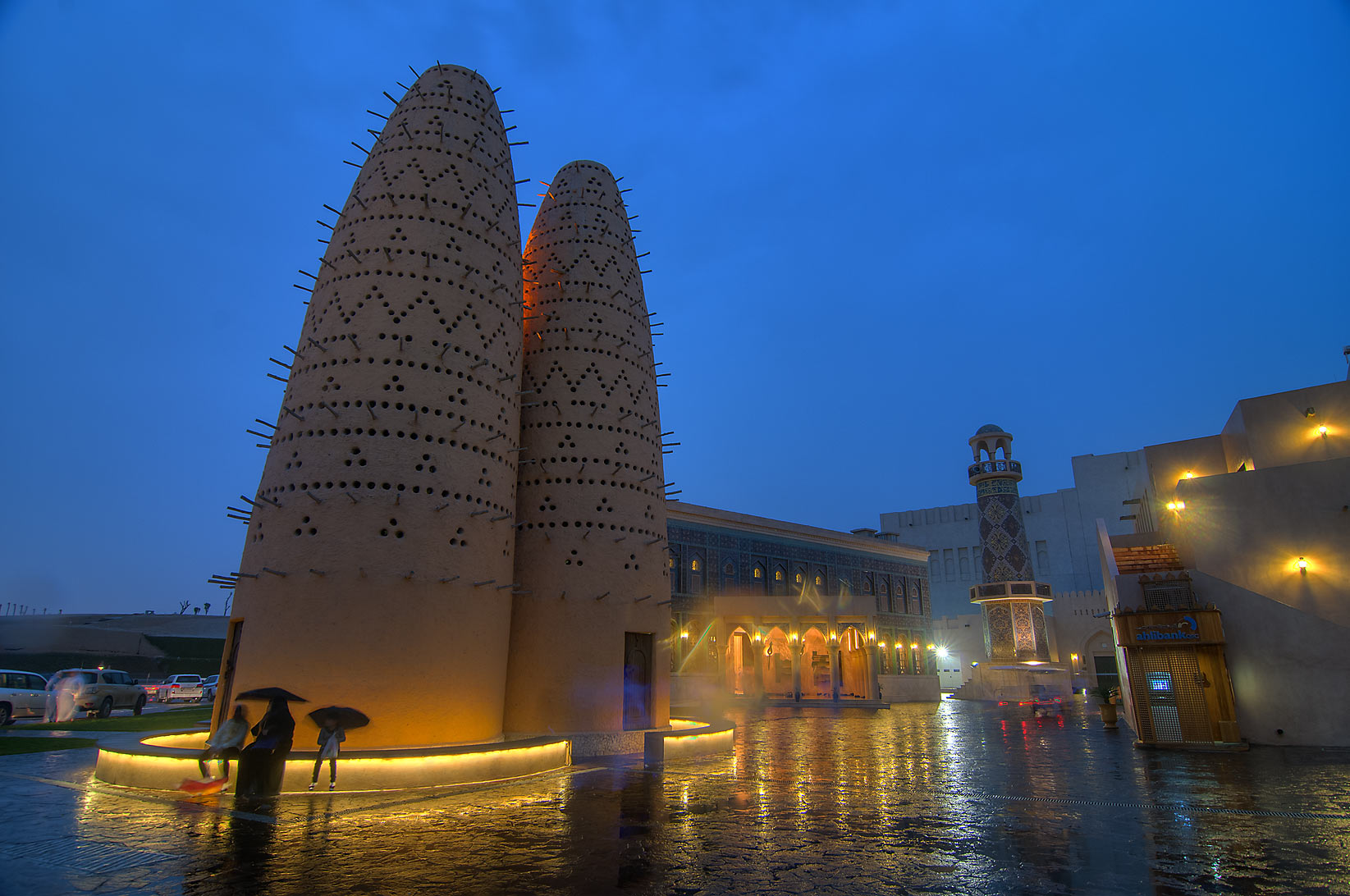
Traditional buildings at Katara Cultural Village

In Doha's traditional architecture, the primary building material was locally quarried limestone, with walls typically measuring 0.4 metres (1 ft 4 in) to 0.6 metres (2 ft 0 in) thick, constructed using two rows of large facing stones with a core of mud, gravel, and smaller stones. These walls were then covered with clay-rich mud or gypsum-based render. Plaster, known as juss, was made from crushed beachrock, shell, baked lime, or gypsum, and applied in three layers for both functional and decorative purposes. Roofing was characteristically flat, utilizing mangrove beams (danshal) imported from East Africa, overlaid with split bamboo, woven reed, and palm mats, then sealed with tamped earth. Distinctive architectural elements included colonnaded verandas (liwan) with lintels made of mangrove poles bound with jute rope, and wooden waterspouts for drainage. Valuable materials such as wooden beams, windows, and doors were often recycled from older structures.

Many of the older structures (1960–1970s) in the Old Doha districts have been demolished to make space for new buildings. A number of schemes have been taken to preserve the city's cultural and architectural heritage, such as the Qatar Museums Authority's 'Al Turath al Hai' ('living heritage') initiative. Katara Cultural Village is a model village in Doha launched by Sheikha Moza bint Nasser under Qatar Foundation to preserve the cultural identity of the country.

=== Modern architecture ===
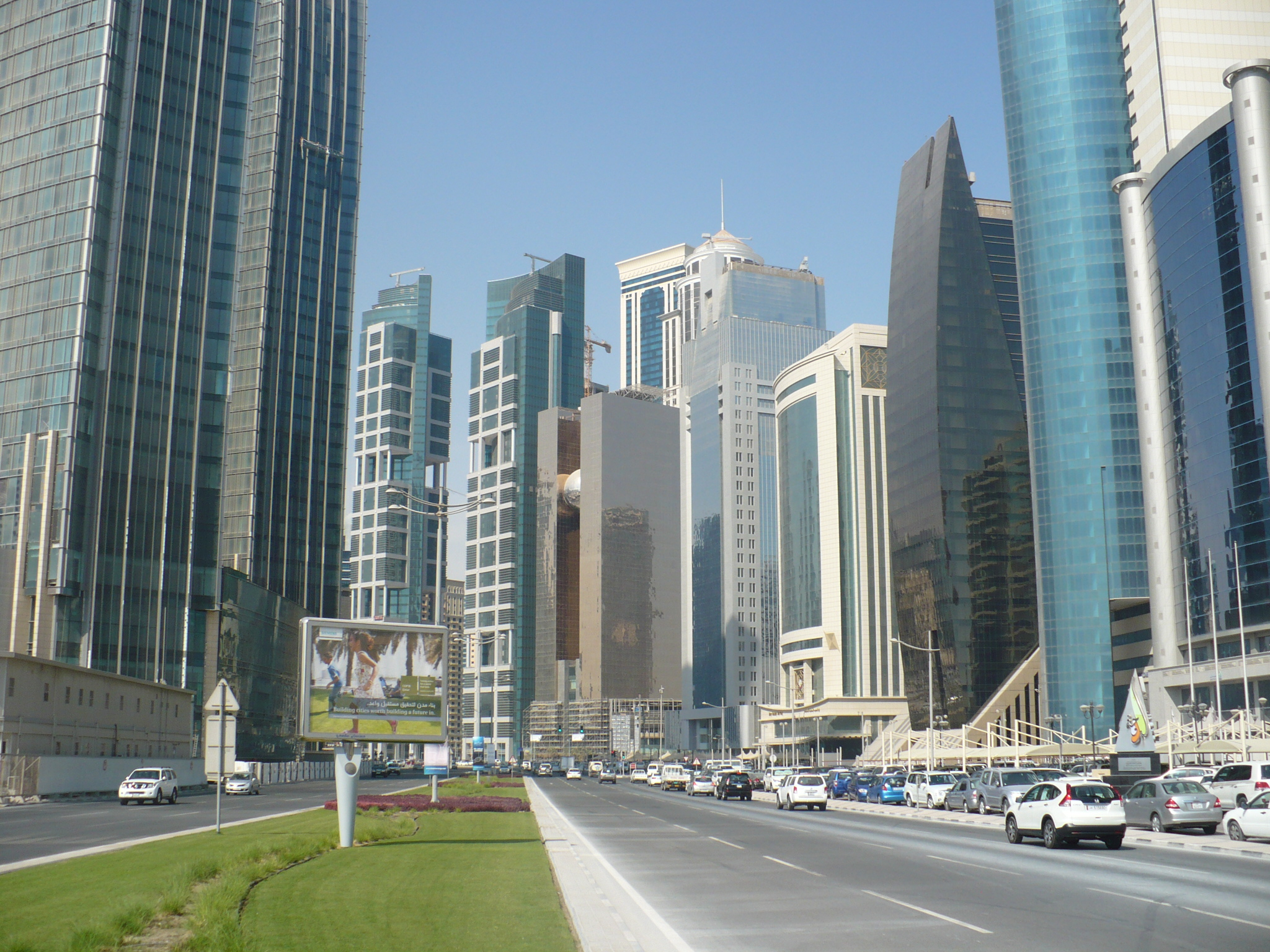
Doha's Al Dafna area with the high-rises seen on the waterfront and the villa compounds and other residential areas seen in the background

During the mid-20th century, Qatar saw a transition from traditional building techniques to more modern ones. In the 1950s, a notable change was the adoption of concrete blocks with shell inclusions. These blocks were primarily produced locally and incorporated a distinctive shelly sand rich in small gastropod remains, a material abundant along Qatar's coastline.

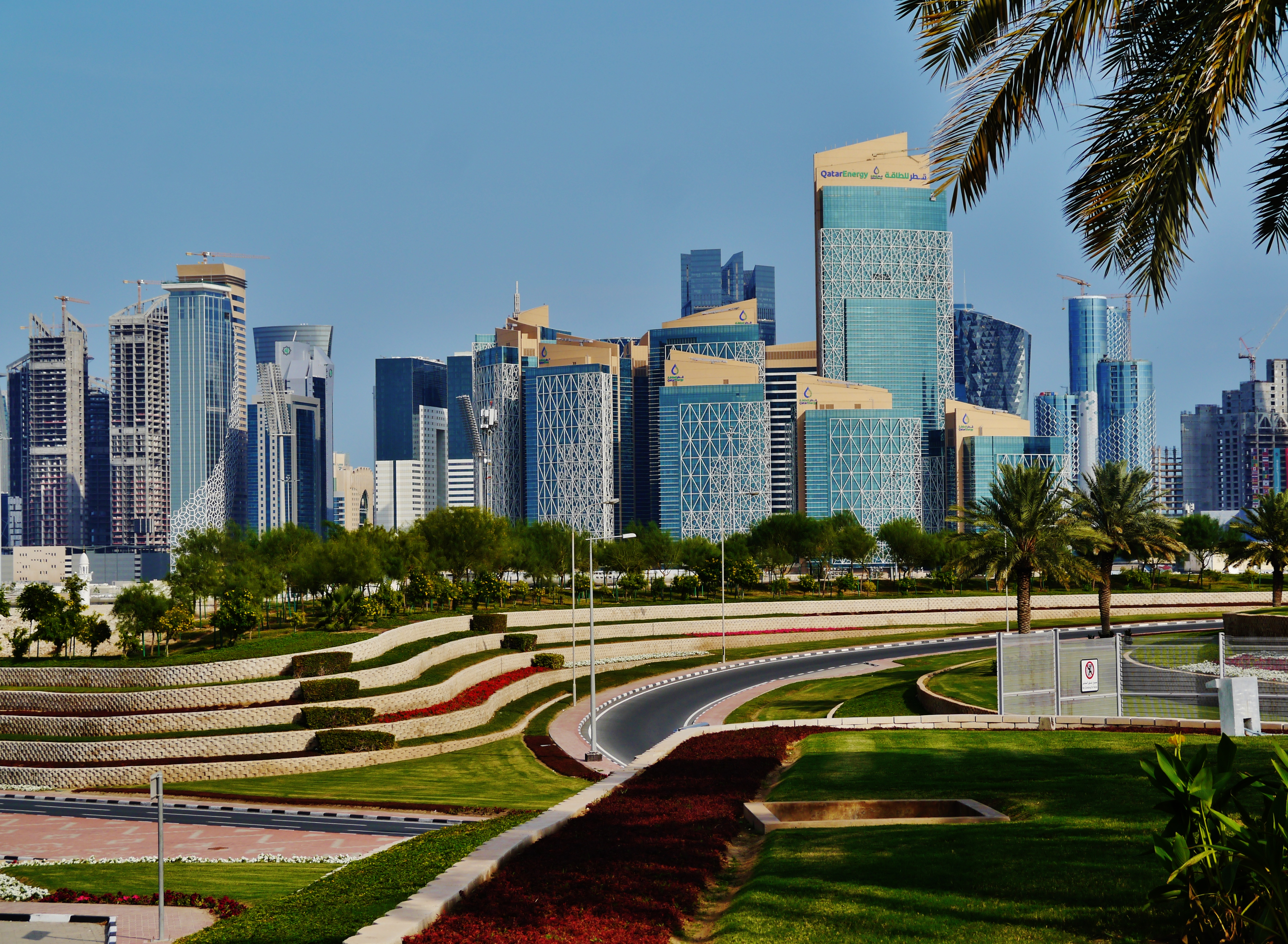
Doha Skyline and Qatar Petroleum District

As Qatar progressed into the latter half of the 20th century, construction methods evolved, with the use of shell-infused concrete blocks gradually giving way to more standardized building materials. This newer phase of construction is characterized by the use of plain concrete blocks without shell content and reinforced concrete structures. New materials such as manufactured wood products including plywood and metal materials such as corrugated iron were also introduced. This period also saw the widespread adoption of air conditioning systems. In 2011, more than 50 towers were under construction in Doha, the largest of which was the Doha Convention Center Tower. Constructions were suspended in 2012 following concerns that the tower would impede flight traffic and the site is being redeveloped into a park.

In 2014, Abdullah Al Attiyah, a senior government official, announced that Qatar would spend $65bn on new infrastructure projects in upcoming years in preparation for the 2022 FIFA World Cup as well as progressing towards its objectives set out in the Qatar National Vision 2030.

Msheireb Downtown Doha, a 31-hectare development costing an estimated $5bn, was dubbed the largest inner city redevelopment of its kind when launched. Comprising several quarters opened over different phases, Msheireb aims to preserve the historic downtown area.

=== National Museum of Qatar ===
National Museum of Qatar

The new National Museum of Qatar (NMoQ) opened to the public on 28 March 2019. The museum features an innovative design by Pritzker Prize-winning architect Jean Nouvel that is inspired by the desert rose and grows organically around the original 20th century palace of Sheikh Abdullah Bin Jassim Al Thani. This important monument to Qatar's past is now preserved as the heart of the new NMoQ. The relation between the new and old building is part of creating the bridge between the past and the present advocated by Sheikha Al Mayassa for it is the way to "define ourselves instead of forever being defined by others celebrating our identity." Located on a 1.5 million-square-foot site at the south end of Doha Corniche, the NMoQ building rises from the sea and is connected to the shore by two pedestrian bridges and a road bridge.

Aspire Tower

=== Doha Tower ===
Doha Tower also known as Burj Doha, and previously named Burj Qatar and Doha High Rise Office Building, is a high rise tower in West Bay, Doha. On 18 October 2012, the building received the CTBUH Skyscraper Award for the Best Tall Building Worldwide from the CTBUH. The $125-million office building, designed by French architect Jean Nouvel, has a height of 238 metres (781 ft), with 46 stories.

=== Aspire Tower ===
Aspire Tower, also known as The Torch Doha, is a 300-metre-tall (980 ft) skyscraper hotel located in the Aspire Zone complex in Doha. Designed by architect Hadi Simaan and AREP and engineer Ove Arup and Partners, the tower served as the focal point for the 15th Asian Games hosted by Qatar in December 2006. The tower is currently the tallest structure and building in Doha and Qatar.

=== Tornado Tower ===
Tornado Tower

The Tornado Tower also called the QIPCO Tower, is a high-rise office skyscraper in Doha. The building stands at a height of 640 feet (195 m) tall with 52 floors. Construction began in 2006 and was completed in 2008.

=== Museum of Islamic Art ===
The five-storeyed Museum of Islamic Art designed by Pritzker Prize-winning architect I. M. Pei

Museum of Islamic Art, MIA is a museum on one end of the seven-kilometer-long (4.3 mi) Corniche in Doha. As per the architect I. M. Pei's specifications, the museum is built on an island off an artificial projecting peninsula near the traditional dhow harbor. A purpose-built park surrounds the edifice on the eastern and southern facades while two bridges connect the southern front facade of the property with the main peninsula that holds the park. The western and northern facades are marked by the harbor showcasing the Qatari seafaring past. In September 2017, Qatar Museums appointed Julia Gonnella as new director of MIA.

=== Qatar National Library ===
The Qatar National Library in Doha.

Qatar National Library (QNL) is a modern facility which provides the people of Qatar with access to over one million books. The library is a non-profit organization operated under the umbrella of the Qatar Foundation. The plans for the new national library were announced by Sheikha Moza bint Nasser, chairperson of Qatar Foundation, on 19 November 2012, during a ceremony celebrating the 50th anniversary of the Dar Al Kutub Library in Doha.

=== Al Thumama Stadium ===
Al-Thumama Stadium is a football stadium in Al Thumama district in Doha, located approximately 13 km (8.1 mi) south of the city center. It hosted the 2022 FIFA World Cup held in the country.

=== Msheireb Museums ===
Msheireb Museums is a complex of history museums housed in four historic heritage houses of Msheireb Downtown Doha, the old commercial centre of the city. Each house explores a different aspect of the country's history through the trades and careers of its former residents: slavery, the oil industry, and folk arts and traditions.

The restoration of the four heritage houses Bin Jelmood House, Company House, Mohammed Bin Jassim House, and Radwani House into world-class museums is a part of the first phase of the Heritage Quarter of Msheireb Properties' QR20 billion (US$5.5 billion), 310,000 sq m development. The museum was also included in the 2018 world's best new buildings list of the Royal Institute of British Architects.

=== Atmosphere ===
In the pre-modern era, Doha's architectural landscape was characterized by densely clustered dwellings interconnected by narrow passageways, a design that offered mutual shade, privacy, and safety to residents. This urban configuration persisted until the latter part of the 20th century. Traditional building techniques in Doha emphasized climate adaptation. Thick stone walls, often reaching 0.6 metres (2 ft 0 in) in width, served as effective thermal insulators, mitigating heat transfer to the interior. Facades typically featured minimal fenestration to maintain privacy and regulate internal temperatures. When present, windows were often internal and shuttered, frequently shielded by expansive verandas to minimize solar heat gain.

The badgheer system was used to facilitate air circulation for cooling. This encompassed both windcatchers and wall vents, with the latter being more prevalent in Doha. Large open courtyards were integral to promoting air movement within structures. Design elements such as horizontal apertures at wall bases and within roof screens generated cooling breezes and air circulation. Ornate, perforated gypsum panels served dual purposes, acting as decorative elements while enhancing airflow within domiciles.

Due to excessive heat from the sun during the summer, some Doha-based building companies implemented various forms of cooling technology to alleviate the extremely torrid climatic conditions in the late 20th century. This included creating optical phenomena such as shadows, as well as more expensive techniques like ventilation, coolants, refrigerants, cryogenics, and dehumidifiers. Discussions regarding temperature control have also been features of various scheduled events involving large crowds. Other initiatives attempt to counter the heat by altering working hours, weather alteration methods such as cloud seeding, and using whiter and brighter construction materials to increase the albedo effects. Nonetheless, despite these measures, Doha and other areas of Qatar could become uninhabitable for humans due to climate change by the end of the 21st century.

=== Planned communities ===
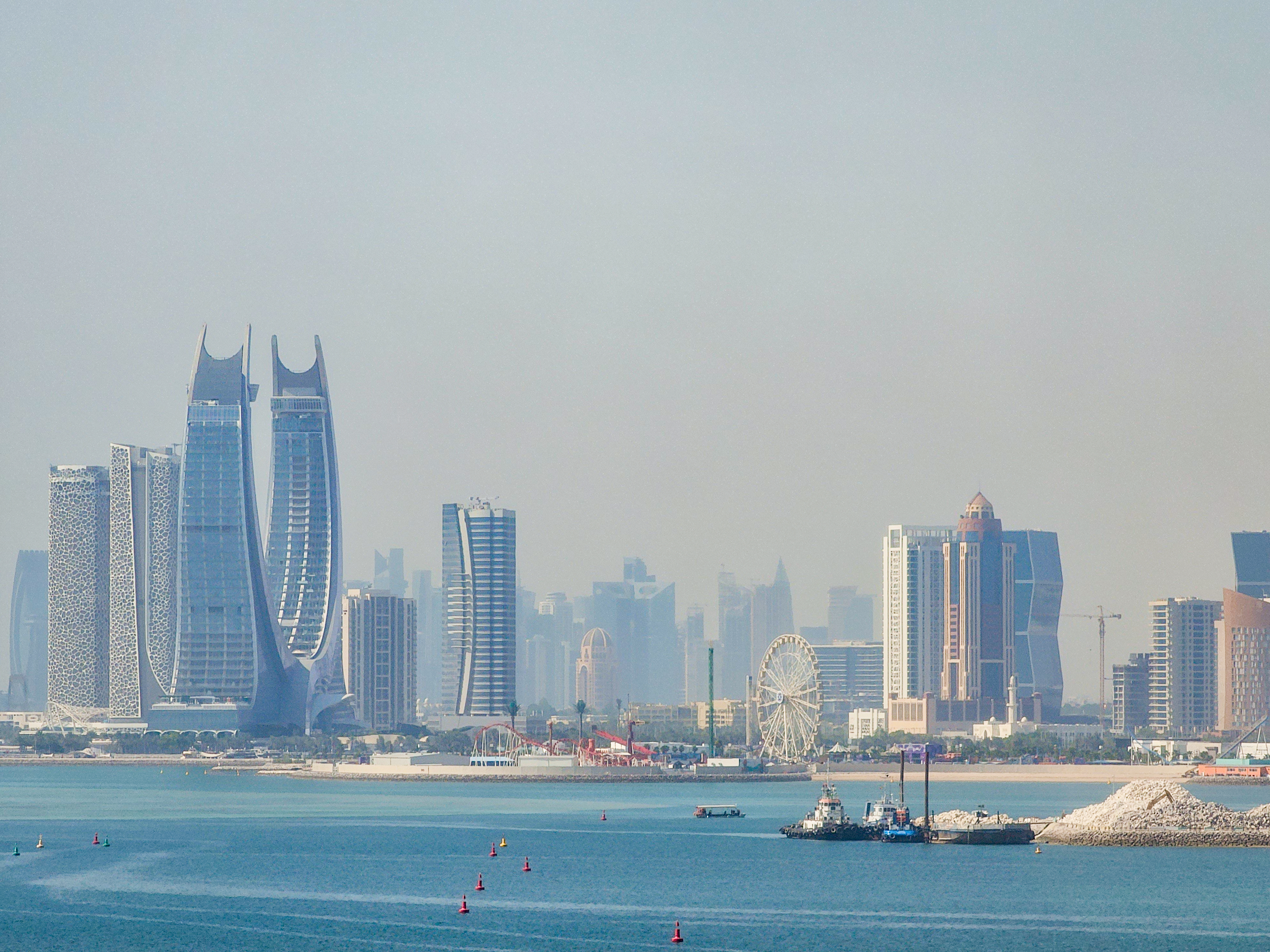
Lusail is one of the recently developed planned communities.

One of the largest urban development projects in Qatar is Lusail City, a planned community north of Doha constructed at a cost of approximately $45bn and designed to accommodate 450,000 people. Al Waab City, another planned community under development, is estimated to cost QR15 bn. In addition to housing 8,000 individuals, it will also have shopping malls, educational, and medical facilities. Gewan Island is the latest development of UDC comprising a 400,000 square metres (4,300,000 sq ft) mixed use development.

== Transportation ==
To support the expanding city and increasing numbers of residents and commuters, Qatar has heavily invested in upgrading the infrastructure of Doha and Qatar. Since 2004, Doha has been undergoing a huge expansion to its transportation network, including the addition of new highways, a new airport in 2014, a new seaport in 2016, and an 85 kilometres (53 mi) metro system which went operational in 2019.

=== Roads ===
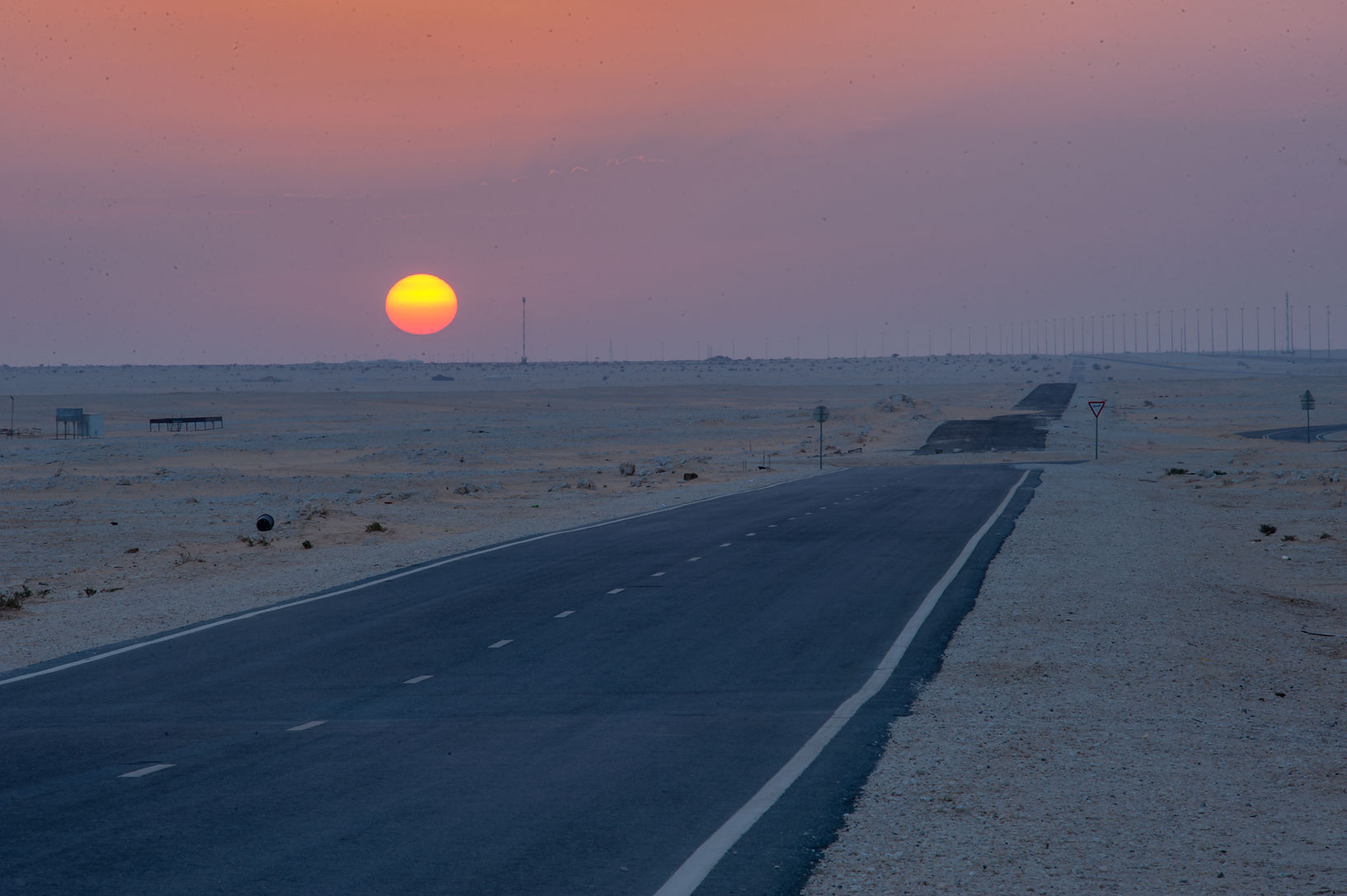
Dukhan Highway connects the city of Dukhan on the West coast of the country with the country's capital, Doha.

The main highways in Doha include Dukhan Highway connecting to Dukhan; the 95.2 kilometres (59.2 mi) Al Shamal Road connecting the Doha Metropolitan Area to the northern region of Al Shamal; the 33 kilometres (21 mi) Al Khor Coastal Road connecting to Al Khor, the 95 kilometres (59 mi) Salwa Road connecting to the Saudi Arabian border; the 195 kilometres (121 mi) Al Majd Road which is the longest highway in Qatar; the 5.5 kilometres (3.4 mi) Lusail Expressway connecting to Lusail; the 8.7 kilometres (5.4 mi) F-Ring Road linking Rawdat Al Khail Street to Al Matar Street; the 22 kilometres (14 mi) G-Ring Road connecting Hamad International Airport to the south of the Industrial Area; and the Industrial Area Road, a 12.5 kilometres (7.8 mi)-dual carriageway positioned south of the Doha Industrial Area.

One of the latest projects, expected to be delivered in 2024 is the Sharq Crossing in Doha Bay. At a cost of approximately $12 billion, the crossing is expected to connect Hamad International Airport with both Katara Cultural Village and West Bay.

=== Rail ===
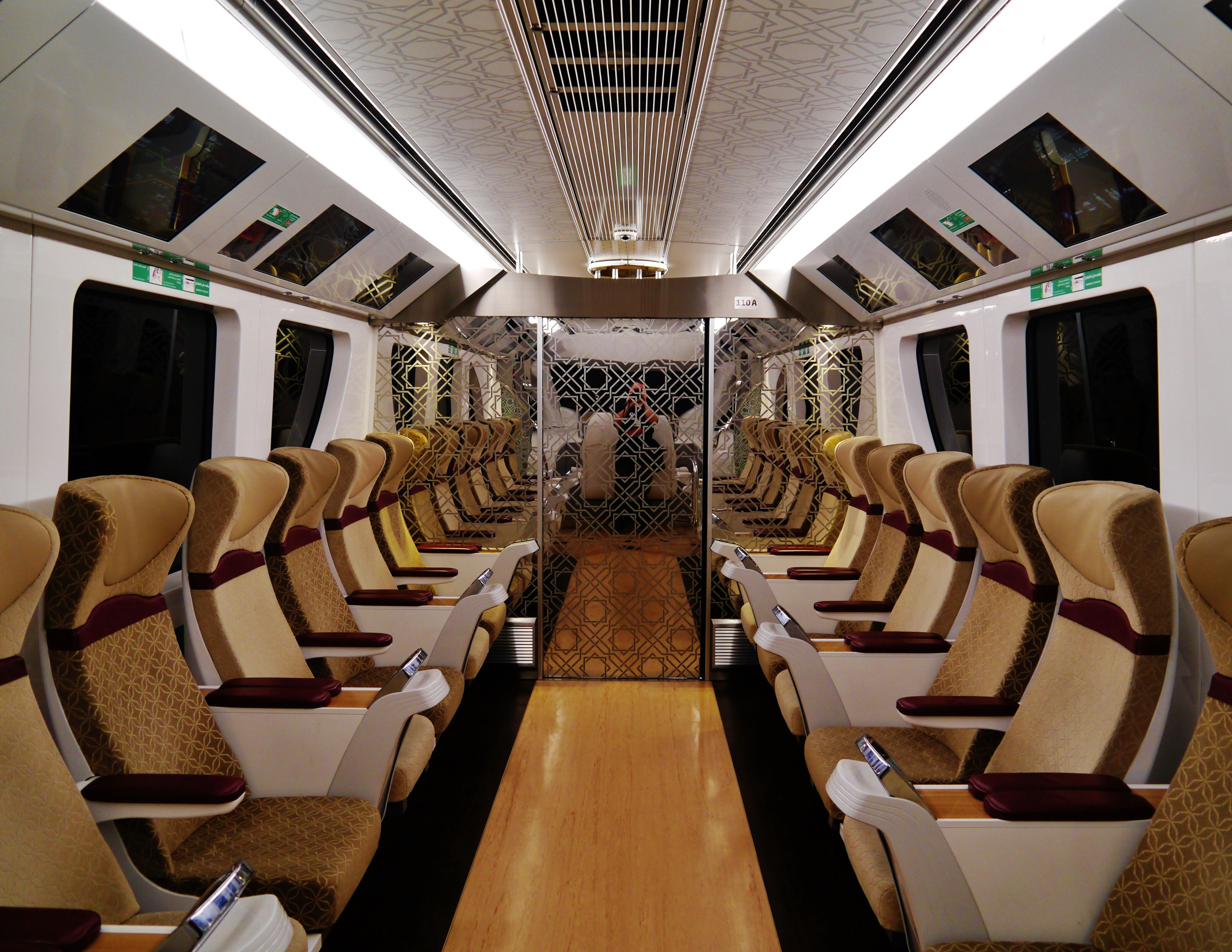
Doha Metro interior

Three of the Doha Metro's four lines are currently fully operational. The system consists of the Red Line, the Gold Line, the Green Line, and the incomplete Blue Line. The Blue Line is expected to be completed in the second phase in 2025. Msheireb Station is the transfer station for all of the metro lines.

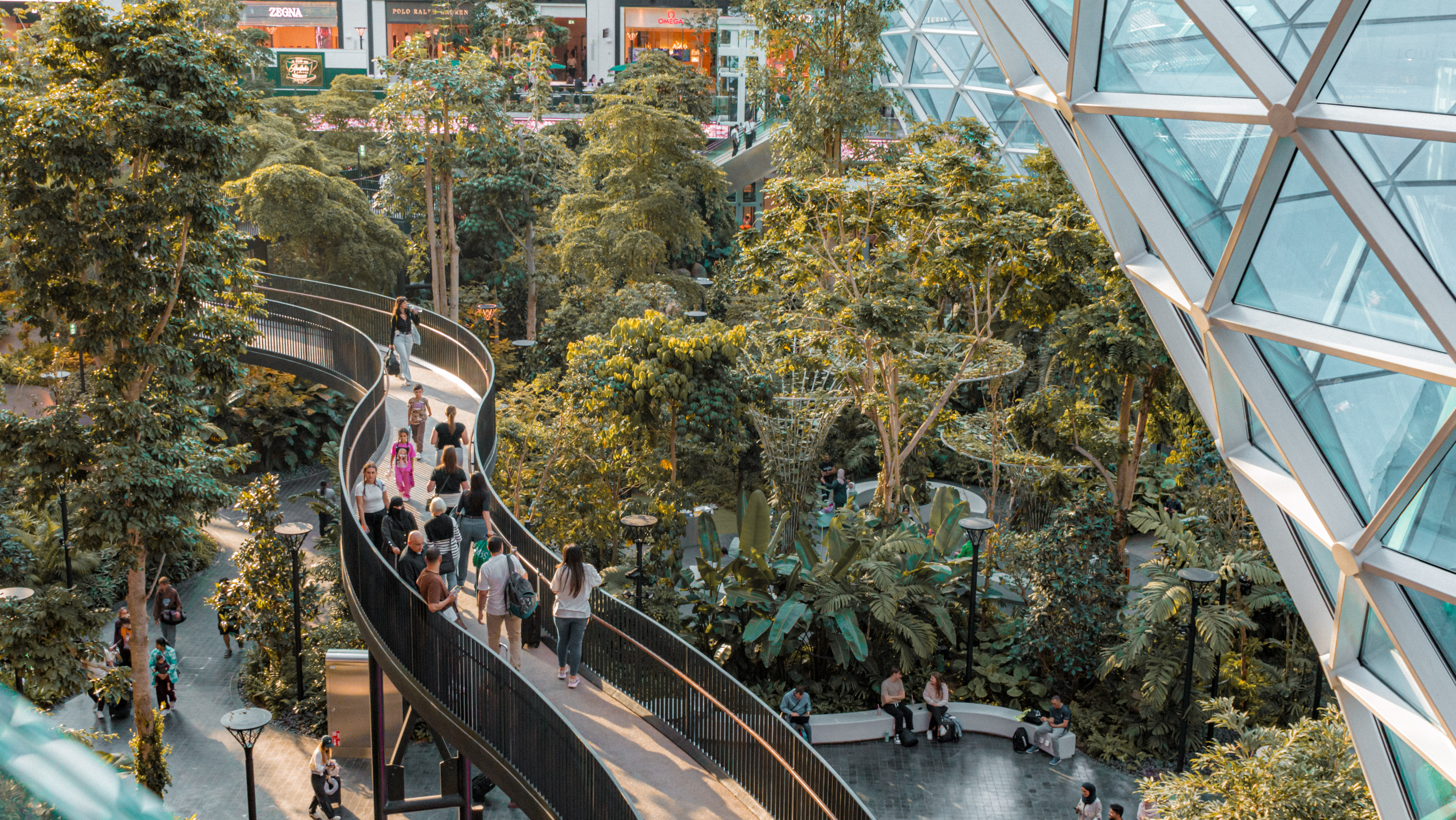
Walking Path in 'The Orchard' at Hamad International Airport

The Red Line (also known as Coast Line) extends through Doha, running from Al Khor to Al Wakrah and Hamad Airport via the Red Line North and Red Line South. Doha Metro's Green Line, or Education Line, connects Doha to Education City and Al Riffa. Starting in Old Airport, the Gold Line (also known as Historic Line) will end in Al Rayyan and cover a distance of 30.6 kilometres (19.0 mi). Lastly, the Blue Line, or City Line, will only cover the inner city of Doha, and is planned to be semi-circular with a length of 17.5 kilometres (10.9 mi).

=== Air ===
Doha is served by Hamad International Airport which is Qatar's principal international gateway. The airport opened in 2014, replacing Doha International Airport. The airport is named after the previous Emir of Qatar, Hamad bin Khalifa Al Thani. Hamad International Airport became the first Middle Eastern airport to be awarded the Skytrax's World Best Airport for 2021 in the 2021 World Airport Awards, ending the 7-year dominance of Singapore's Changi Airport. Qatar's Hamad International Airport has been named the World's Best Airport for the second year running. The announcement took place at the Skytrax 2022 World Airport Awards, held at Passenger Terminal EXPO in Paris, France.

=== Taxi ===
There are a variety of taxi operators in the Doha area. A plurality of taxis across the city and Hamad International Airport are marked by a distinctive turquoise colour; these taxis are owned and operated by Mowasalat, a government-owned enterprise, under the brand name Karwa. Ride-hailing applications like Uber, Ryde, Badrgo, and Aabir are also readily available across the city.

== Education ==
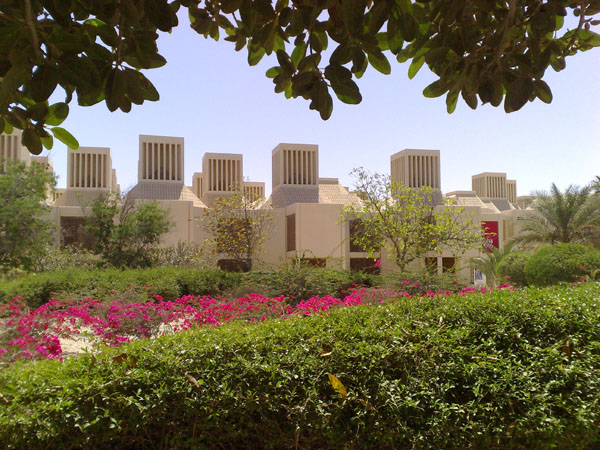
Qatar University

Carnegie Mellon University in Qatar

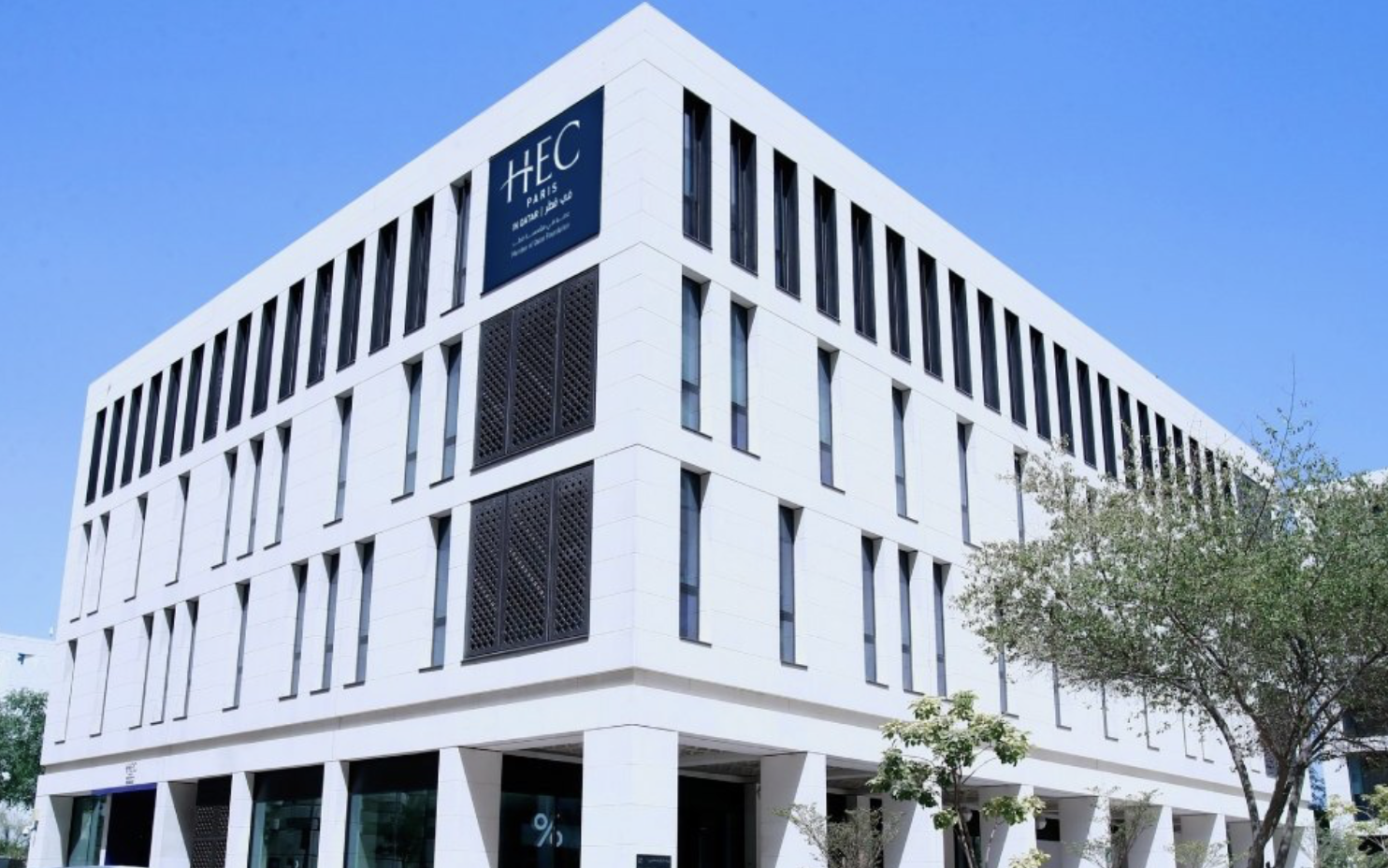
HEC Paris, Doha

Doha is the educational center of the country and contains the highest preponderance of schools and colleges. In 1952, the first formal boys' school was opened in Doha. This was proceeded by the opening of the first formal girls' school three years later. The first university in the state, Qatar University, was opened in 1973. It provided separate faculties for men and women.

Education City, a 14 km^{2} (5.4 sq mi) education complex launched by non-profit organization Qatar Foundation, began construction in 2000. It houses eight universities, the country's top high school, and offices for Al Jazeera's children television channel. It is geographically located in Al Rayyan municipality's Al Luqta, Al Gharrafa, Gharrafat Al Rayyan and Al Shagub districts, but falls under the umbrella of Metropolitan Doha.

In 2009, the government launched the World Innovation Summit for Education (WISE), a global forum that brings together education stakeholders, opinion leaders and decision-makers from all over the world to discuss educational issues. The first edition was held in Doha in November 2009.

Some of the universities in Doha include:

- Carnegie Mellon University in Qatar
- Georgetown University School of Foreign Service in Qatar
- Hamad Bin Khalifa University
- Cornell University
- HEC Paris in Qatar
- Northwestern University in Qatar
- Texas A&M University at Qatar
- UCL Qatar
- Virginia Commonwealth University
- Weill Cornell Medical College in Qatar
- Stenden University Qatar
- College of the North Atlantic
- Qatar University
- Qatar Faculty of Islamic Studies
- University of Calgary

== Sports ==
=== Football ===
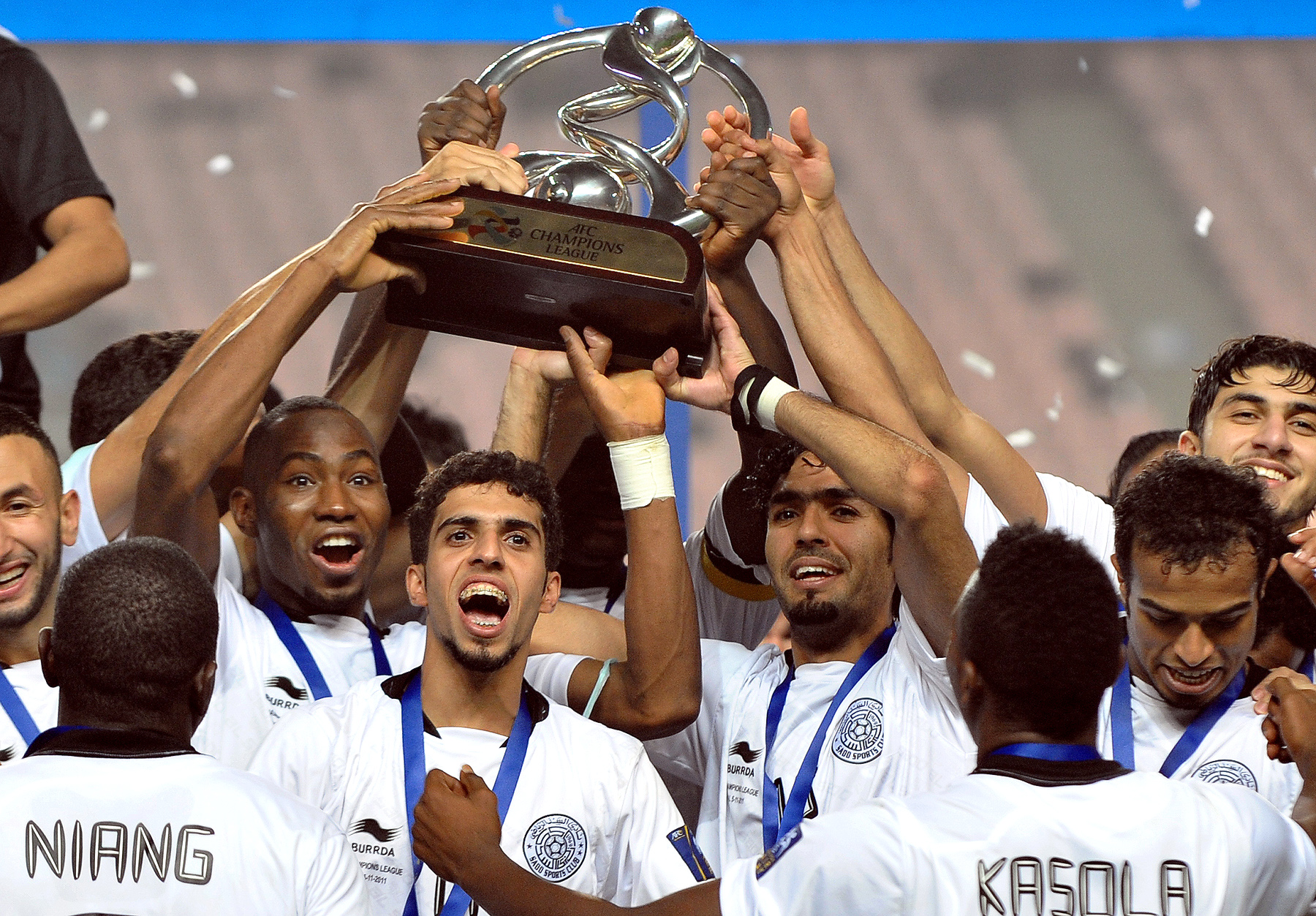
Al Sadd is the most successful team in the Qatar Stars League.

Football is the most popular sport in Doha. There are six Doha-based sports clubs with football teams competing in the Qatar Stars League, the country's top football league. They are Al Ahli, Al Arabi, Al Sadd, Al-Duhail and Qatar SC. Al Sadd, Al Arabi and Qatar SC are the three most successful teams in the league's history.

Numerous football tournaments have been hosted in Doha. The most prestigious tournaments include the 1988 and 2011 editions of the AFC Asian Cup and the 1995 FIFA World Youth Championship.

In December 2010, Qatar won the right to host the 2022 FIFA World Cup. Three of the nine newly announced stadiums were constructed in Doha, including Sports City Stadium, Doha Port Stadium, and Qatar University Stadium. Additionally, the Khalifa International Stadium underwent expansion.

Considering the country's rapid development for the 2022 World Cup, FIFA awarded the hosting rights of 2019 FIFA Club World Cup and 2020 FIFA Club World Cup also to Qatar.

=== Basketball ===
Doha was the host of the official 2005 FIBA Asia Championship, where Qatar's national basketball team finished 3rd, its best performance to date, and subsequently qualified for the Basketball World Cup.

The city will host matches for the 2027 FIBA Basketball World Cup.

The majority of the teams that make up the official Qatari Basketball League are based in Doha.

=== Volleyball ===
Doha four times was the host of the official FIVB Volleyball Men's Club World Championship and three times host FIVB Volleyball Women's Club World Championship. Doha also hosted the Asian Volleyball Championship.

=== Other sports ===
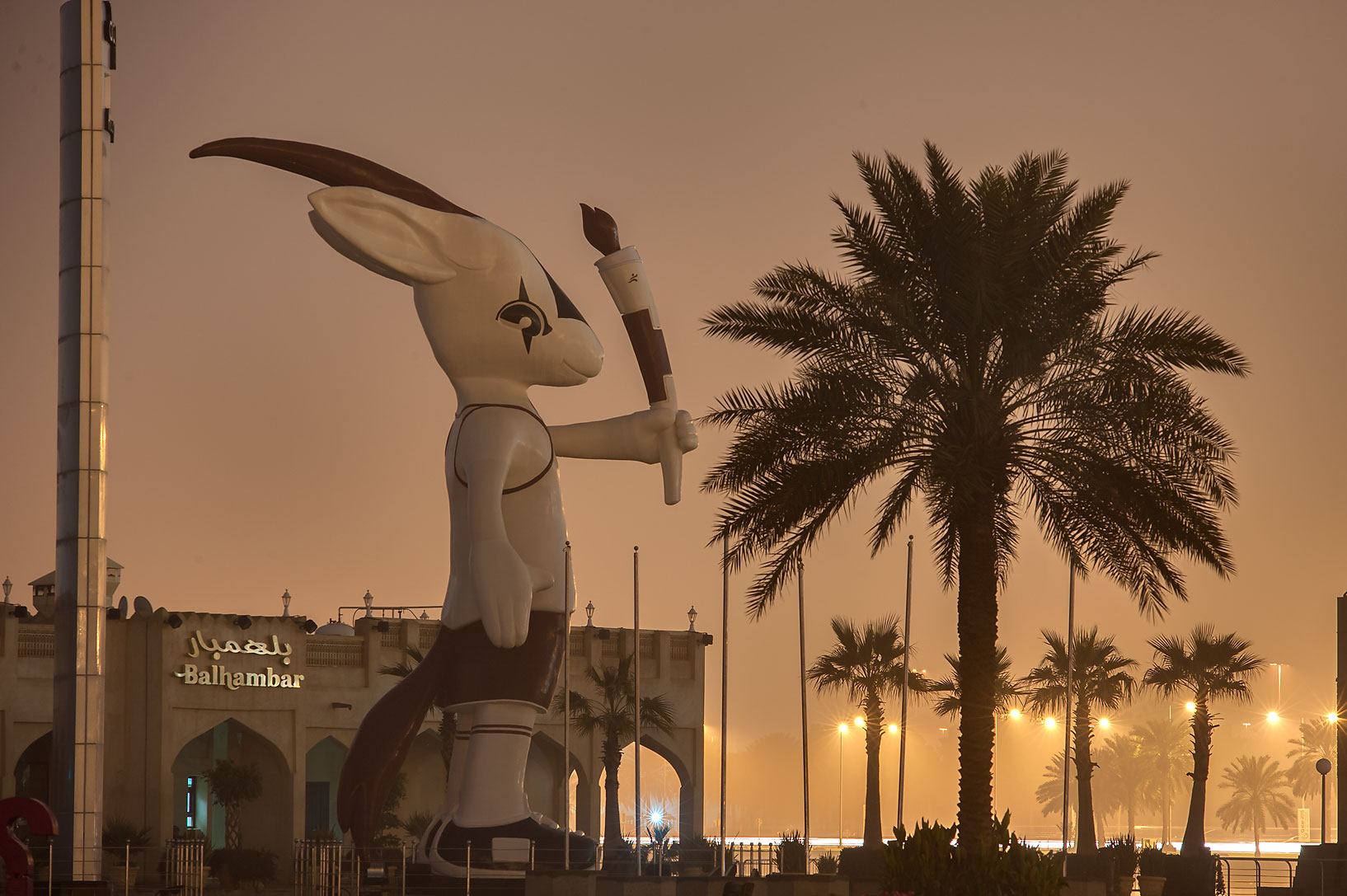
Orry the Oryx, mascot of the 15th Asian Games, on the Doha Corniche in 2014

In 2001, Qatar became the first country in the Middle East to hold a women's tennis tournament with the inauguration of its Qatar Ladies Open tournament. Doha also hosts International Tennis Federation (ITF) ladies tournaments. Since 2008, the Sony Ericsson Championships (equivalent to the ATP's season-ending Championships) has taken place in Doha, in the Khalifa International Tennis Complex, and features record prize money of $4.45 million, including a check of $1,485,000 for the winner, which represents the largest single guaranteed payout in women's tennis.

Doha hosted the 15th Asian Games, held in December 2006, spending a total of $2.8 billion for its preparation. The city also hosted the 3rd West Asian Games in December 2005. Doha was expected to host the 2011 Asian Indoor Games; but the Qatar Olympic Committee cancelled the event.

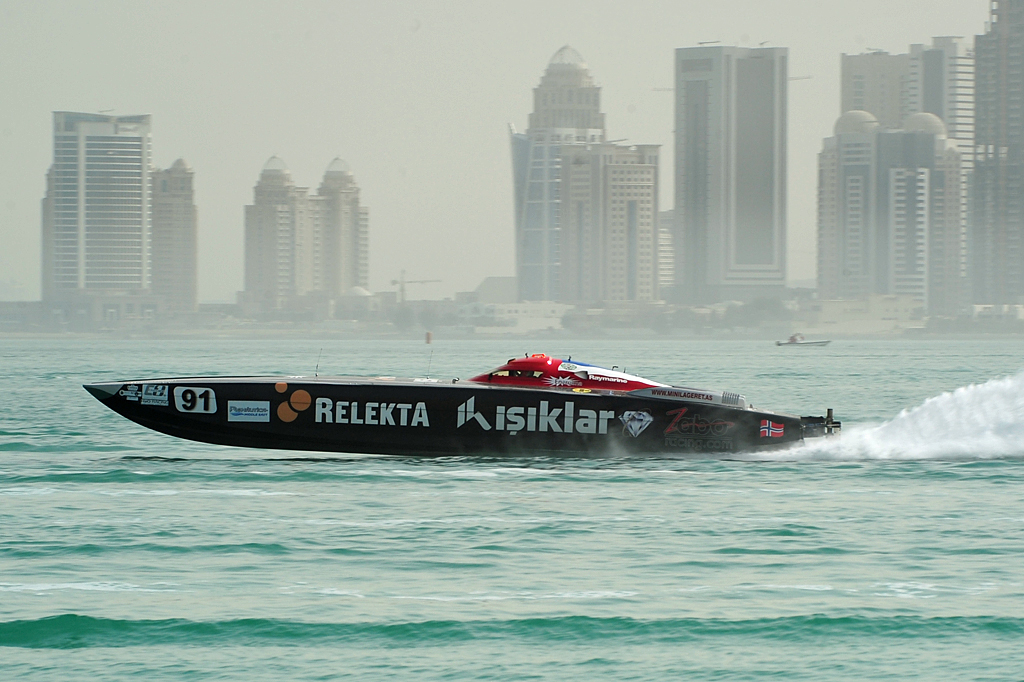
Powerboat races in Doha Bay

The city submitted a bid for the 2016 Olympics. On 4 June 2008, the city was eliminated from the shortlist for the 2016 Olympic Games. On 26 August 2011, it was confirmed that Doha would bid for the 2020 Summer Olympics. Doha however failed to become a Candidate City for the 2020 Games.

The MotoGP motorcycling grand prix of Doha is held annually at Losail International Circuit, located just outside the city boundaries. The city is also the location of the Grand Prix of Qatar for the F1 Powerboat World Championship, annually hosting a round in Doha Bay. Beginning in November 2009, Doha has been host of The Oryx Cup World Championship, a hydroplane boat race in the H1 Unlimited season. The races take place in Doha Bay.

In April 2012 Doha was awarded both the 2014 FINA World Swimming Championships and the 2012 World Squash Championships. The fourth World Mindsports Championships took place in Doha from 19 – 27 August 2017, with the participation of more than 1,000 competitors.

In 2014, Qatar was selected as the host of the 2019 World Athletics Championships, which is the seventeenth edition of the IAAF World Athletics Championships. Doha won the bid to host the event over Barcelona and Eugene.

In 2020, Doha hosted the Qatar ExxonMobil Open, which received the Tournament of the Year award in the 250 category from the 2019 ATP Awards. The tournament won the award for the third time in five years.

Doha will host the 2030 Asian Games.

=== Stadiums and sport complexes ===
Al Thumama Stadium

Stadium 974

Aspire Academy was launched in 2004 with the aim of creating world-class athletes. It is situated in the Doha Sports City Complex, which also accommodates the Khalifa International Stadium, the Hamad Aquatic Centre, the Aspire Tower, and the Aspire Dome. The latter has hosted more than 50 sporting events since its inception, including some events during the 2006 Asian Games. Aspire Academy, a sporting academy for youth, is located in the center of Aspire Zone.

Sporting venues in Doha and its suburbs include:

- Al Thumama Stadium
- Stadium 974
- Hamad bin Khalifa Stadium – Al-Ahli Stadium
- Jassim Bin Hamad Stadium – Al Sadd Stadium
- Grand Hamad Stadium – Al-Arabi Stadium
- Hamad Aquatic Centre
- Khalifa International Stadium – Main venue for the 2006 Asian Games.
- Khalifa International Tennis and Squash Complex
- Abdullah bin Khalifa Stadium – Duhail Stadium
- Doha Golf Club
- Al Shaqab Venus
- Duhail Handball Sports Hall
- Qatar Sports Club Stadium

== Culture ==
Doha was chosen as the Arab Capital of Culture in 2010. Cultural weeks organized by the Ministry of Culture, which featured both Arab and non-Arab cultures, were held in Doha from April to June to celebrate the city's selection.

=== Arts ===
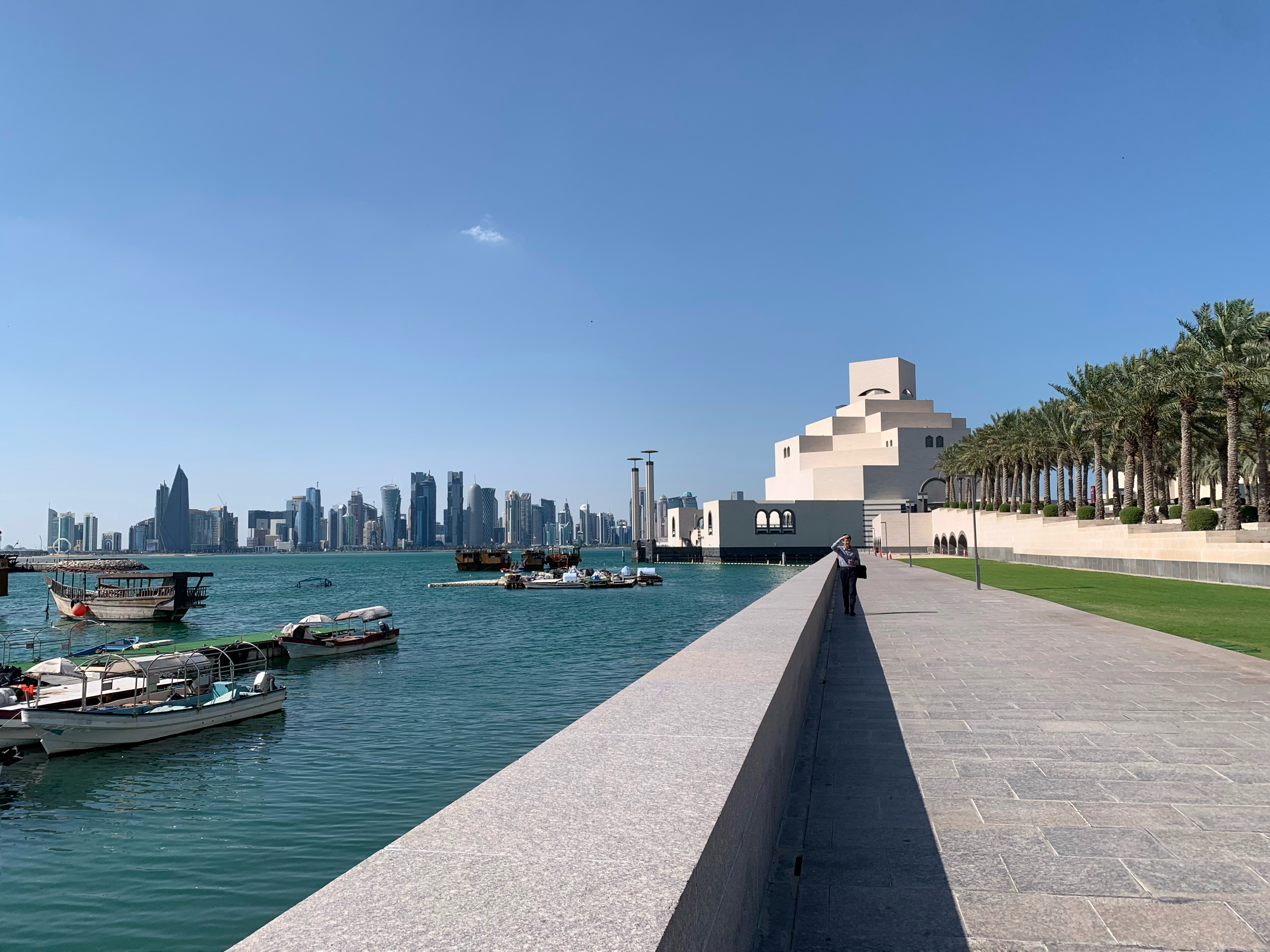
Museum of Islamic Art along the Doha Bay

The Museum of Islamic Art or MIA in Doha, opened in 2008, is regarded as one of the best museums in the region. This, and several other Qatari museums located in the city, like the Arab Museum of Modern Art, falls under the Qatar Museums Authority (QMA) which is led by Sheikha Al-Mayassa bint Hamad bin Khalifa Al-Thani, the sister of the emir of Qatar.

The National Museum of Qatar, which was constructed in place of the original Qatar National Museum, opened to the public on 28 March 2019.

=== Cinema ===
The Doha Film Institute (DFI) is an organisation established in 2010 to oversee film initiatives and create a sustainable film industry in Qatar. DFI was founded by H.E. Sheikha Al Mayassa bint Hamad bin Khalifa Al-Thani.

The Doha Tribeca Film Festival (DTFF), partnered with the American-based Tribeca Film Festival, was held annually in Doha from 2009 to 2012. It emanated from a collaboration between the Doha Film Institute and Tribeca Enterprises. Celebrities such as Robert De Niro, Salma Hayek, Adel Emam, Mira Nair, and Kevin Spacey attended the festivals. The festivals and premieres took place in the Katara Cultural Village annually, as well as the Museum of Islamic Art in 2012. The DTFF premiered up to 87 films from all around the world. The major cinema operators in Doha are Vox, NOVO and Flik.

=== Media ===
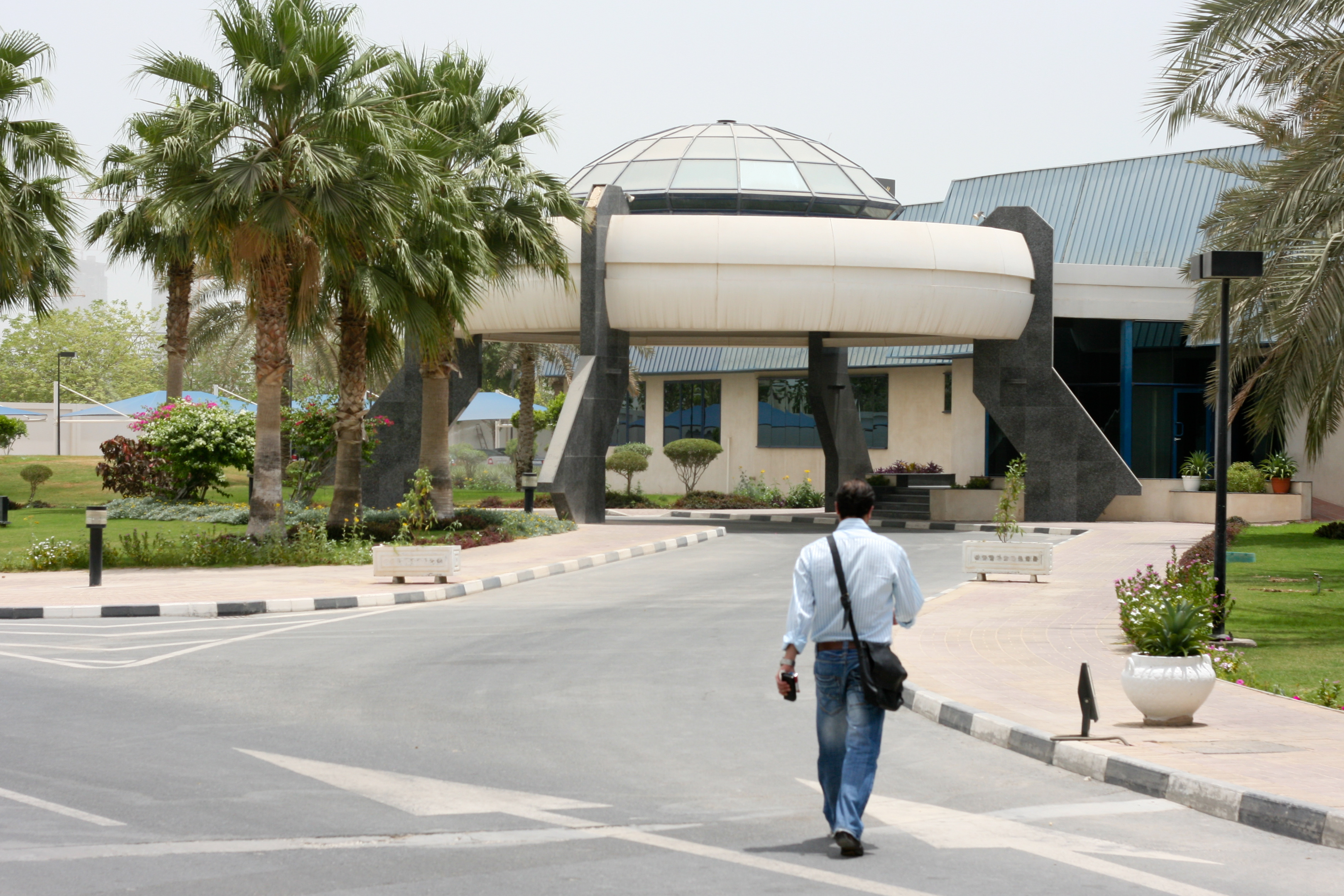
Al Jazeera Arabic Building

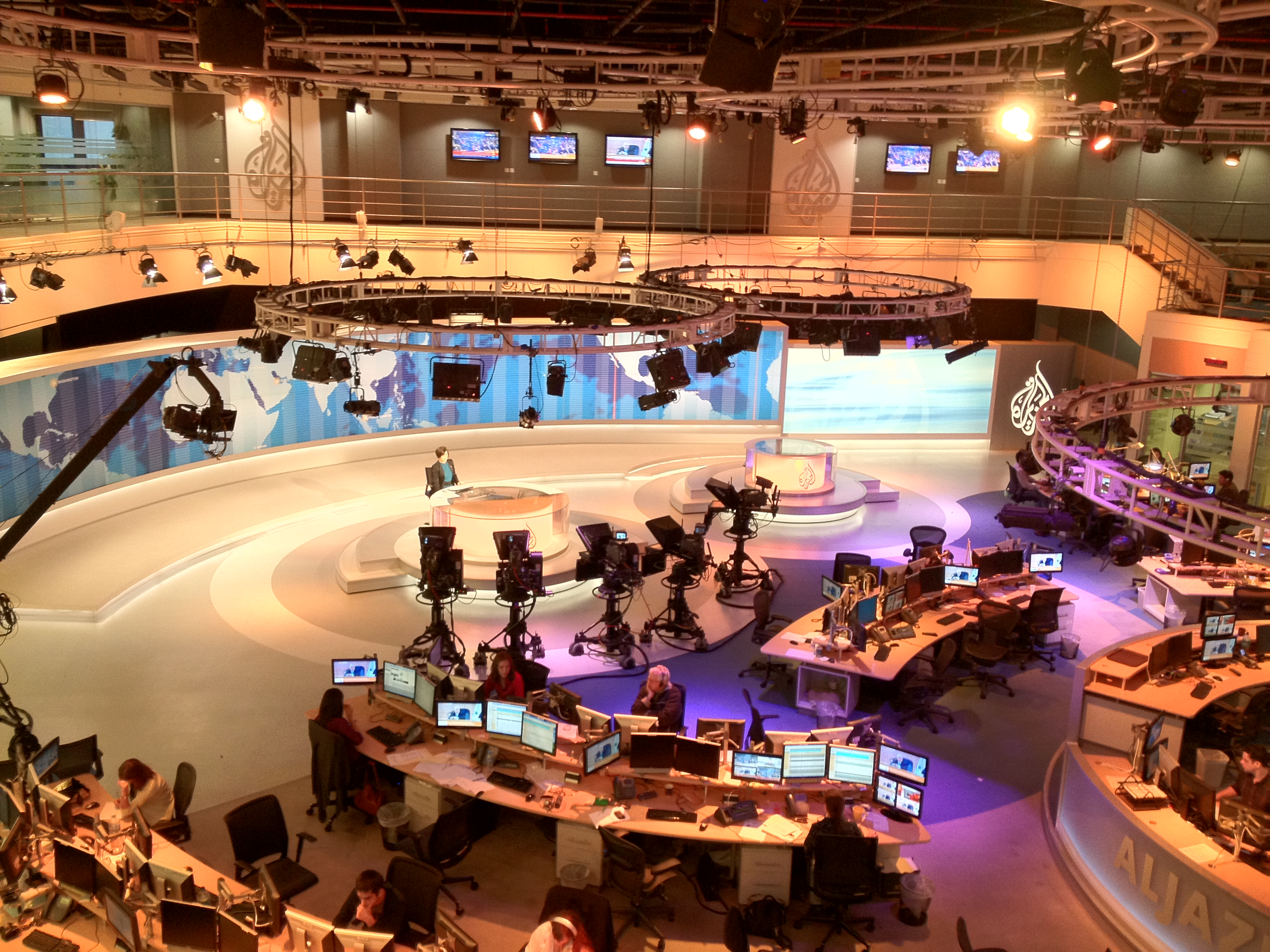
Al Jazeera English Newsroom

Qatar's first radio station, Mosque Radio, began broadcasting in the 1960s from Doha. The multinational media conglomerate Al Jazeera Media Network is based in Doha with its wide variety of channels of which Al Jazeera Arabic, Al Jazeera English, Al Jazeera Documentary Channel, Al Jazeera Mubasher, beIN Sports Arabia and other operations are based in the TV Roundabout in the city. Al-Kass Sports Channel's headquarters is also located in Doha. Al Jazeera Media Network serves as the overarching entity overseeing Al Jazeera English, Al Jazeera Arabic, AJ+ along with several other fact-based media endeavors that bear the same distinct brand. Originally conceived as a satellite TV channel delivering Arabic news and current affairs, it now encompasses various platforms such as online, specialized television channels in numerous languages, and more.

The organization is a private foundation for public benefit under Qatari law. There have been allegations of government control. It was founded in 1996 by the then Emir of Qatar Sheikh Hamad bin Khalifa Al Thani.

=== Theatre ===
The first official theatre troupe in the country was created in 1972 as the "Qatari Theatrical Troupe". It went on to produce its first play the same year. The next year, a second troupe was founded as the Al Sadd Theatrical Troupe. By 1986, the first company had been founded with the intent of aiding troupes and actors in producing plays. Two further troupes were also created during this period: the Lights Theatrical Troupe and Folk Theatrical Troupe. In 1994, the four troupes were amalgamated into two troupes which were named the Qatari Theatrical Troupe and the Doha Theatrical Troupe. Theatre was introduced to Qatar in the mid-20th century. Theatrical performances are held at Qatar National Theater and at the Qatar National Convention Center in Doha.

== Sites and attractions ==
- The Pearl Island
- Qatar National Museum
- Aspire Park
- Souq Waqif
- Katara Cultural Village
- Doha Corniche
- Aspire Tower
- Fanar
- Museum of Islamic Art, Doha
- Doha Tower
- Tornado Tower
- Khalifa International Tennis and Squash Complex
- Oxygen Park
- Doha Golf Club
- Galeries Lafayette
- Al Hazm Mall
- World Trade Center Doha
- Mathaf: Arab Museum of Modern Art
- Msheireb Downtown Doha

== Twin and sister cities ==
Twin and sister cities of Doha are (as per agreements):

- Tunis, Tunisia (since 1994)
- (United States) Alameda, California (since 2004)
- Port Louis, Mauritius (since 2007)
- Beijing, China (since 2008)
- Beit Sahour, Palestine (since 2009)
- (The Gambia) Banjul, Gambia (since 2011)
- Algiers, Algeria (since 2013)
- Sarajevo, Bosnia and Herzegovina (since 2018)
- Brasília, Brazil (since 2014)
- Sofia, Bulgaria (since 2012)
- San Salvador, El Salvador (since 2018)
- (Georgia (country)) Tbilisi, Georgia (since 2012)
- Astana, Kazakhstan (since 2011)
- Bishkek, Kyrgyzstan (since 2018)
- Mogadishu, Somalia (since 2014)
- Ankara, Turkey (since 2016)
- Los Angeles, California, United States (since 2016) (Despite being acknowledged as an agreement, no mention of it in the official Los Angeles website as the sister city.)
- Miami, Florida, United States (since 2016)
- Libertador, Venezuela (since 2015)
- Charleston, South Carolina, United States (2019)
- Yerevan, Armenia (since 2022)

== Gallery ==
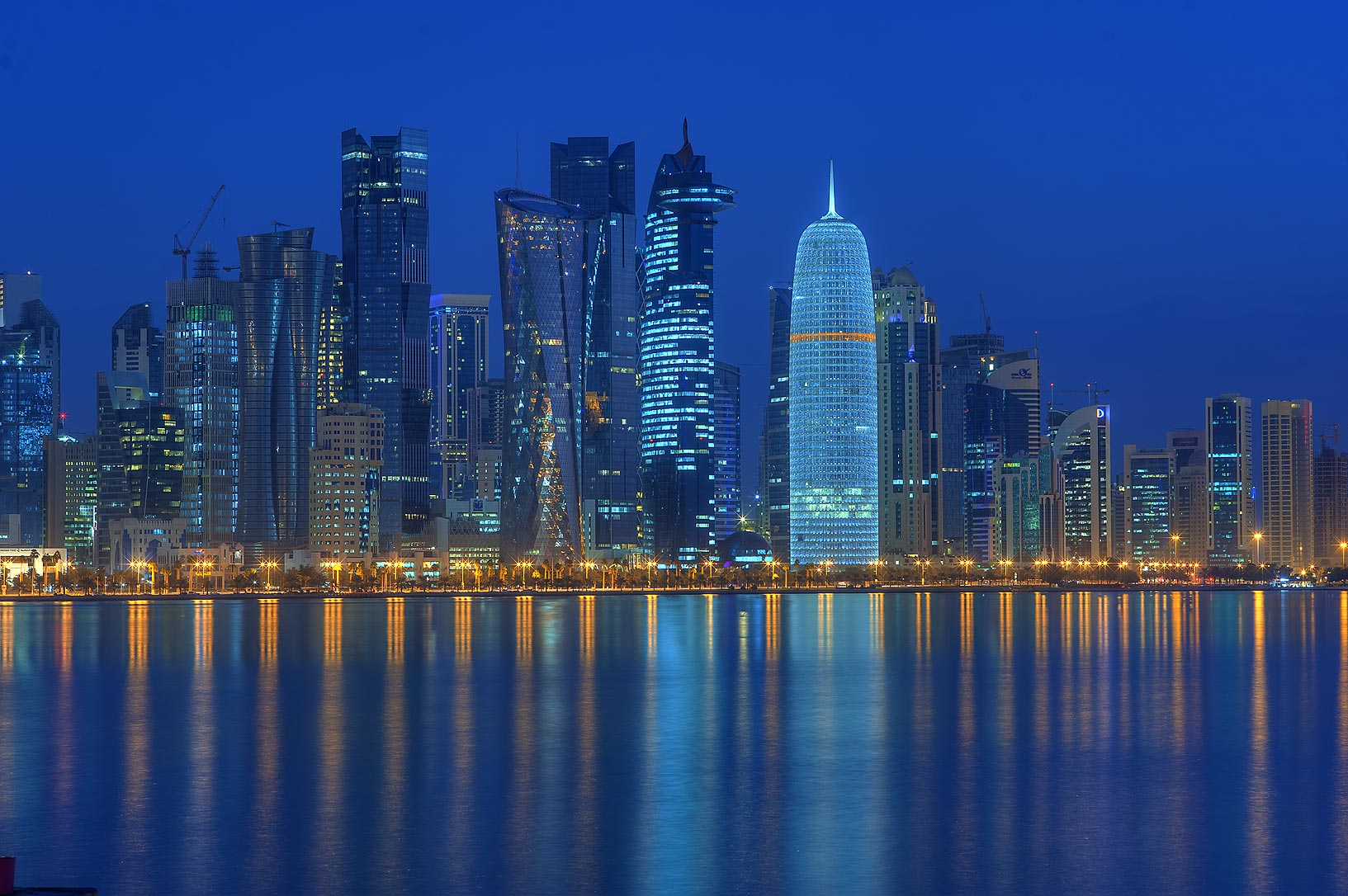
Doha skyline at night

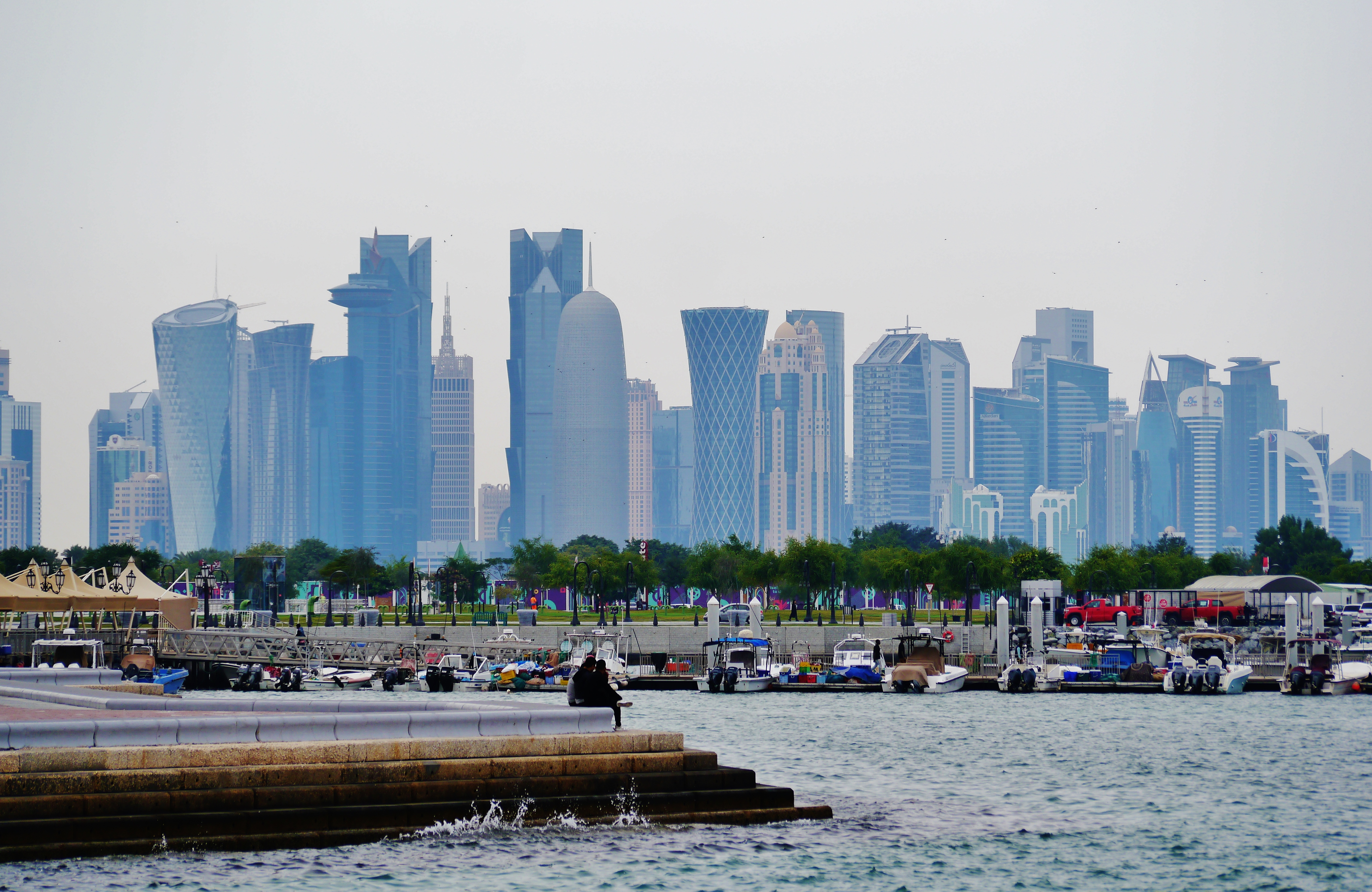
Doha Corniche is the 7 km long waterfront that connects the new district of West Bay with the old district of Al-Bidda and Al-Souq on the other end.

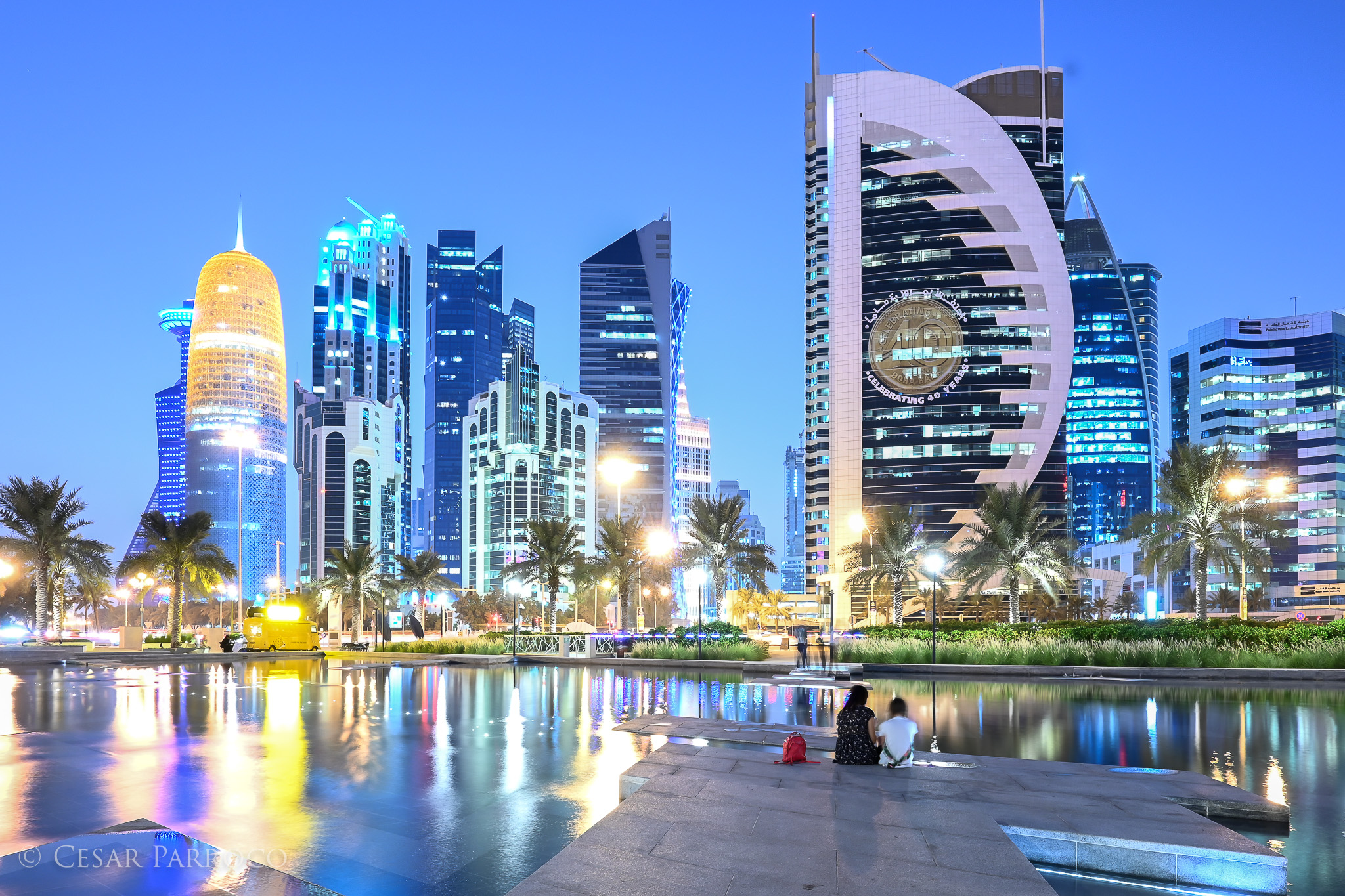
Skyline of Doha West Bay from Sheraton Park

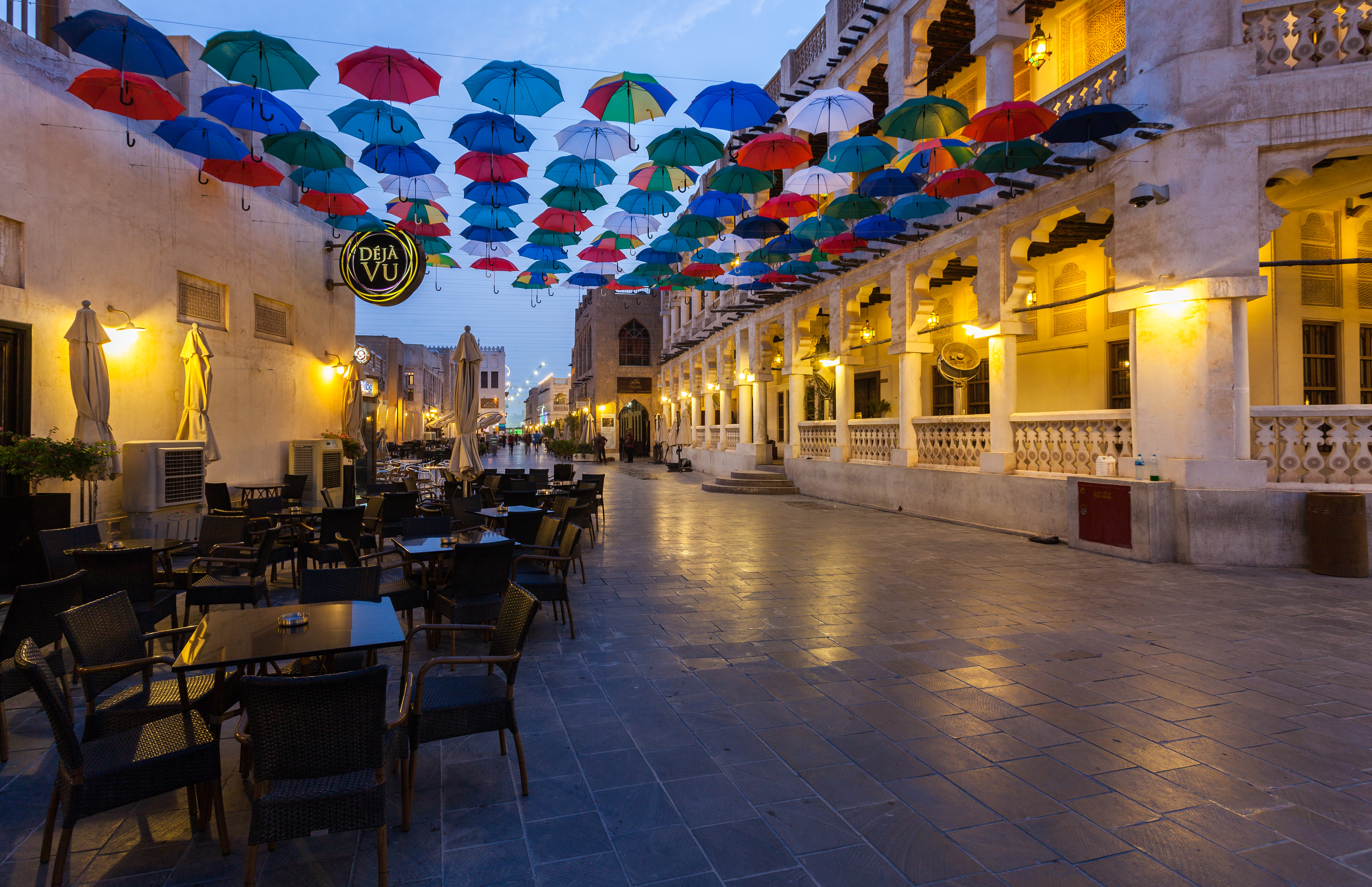
The spring festival at Souq Waqif, Doha

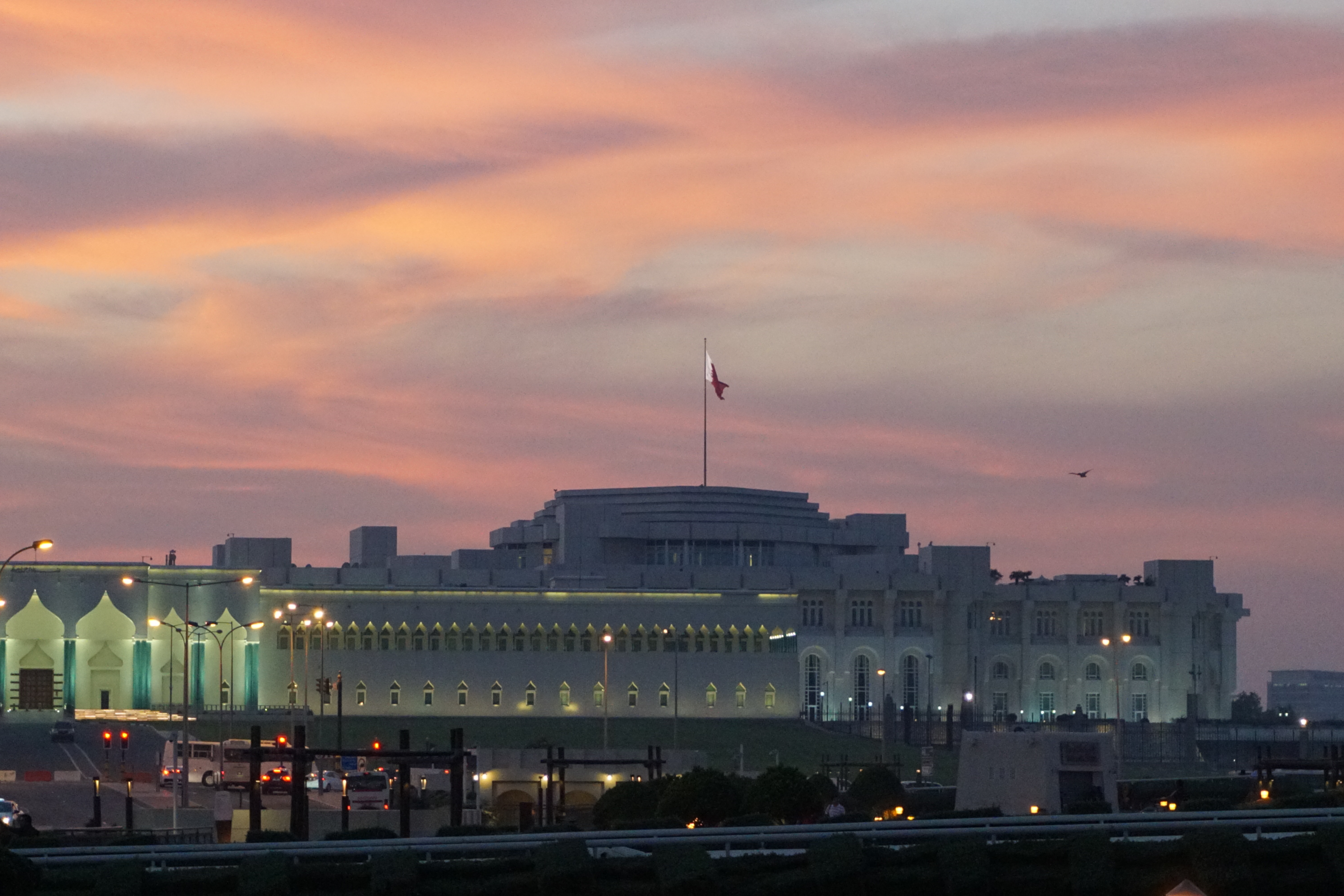
Qatar's Amir (ruler) is housed in the Amiri Diwan, located in the historic Al Bidda district.

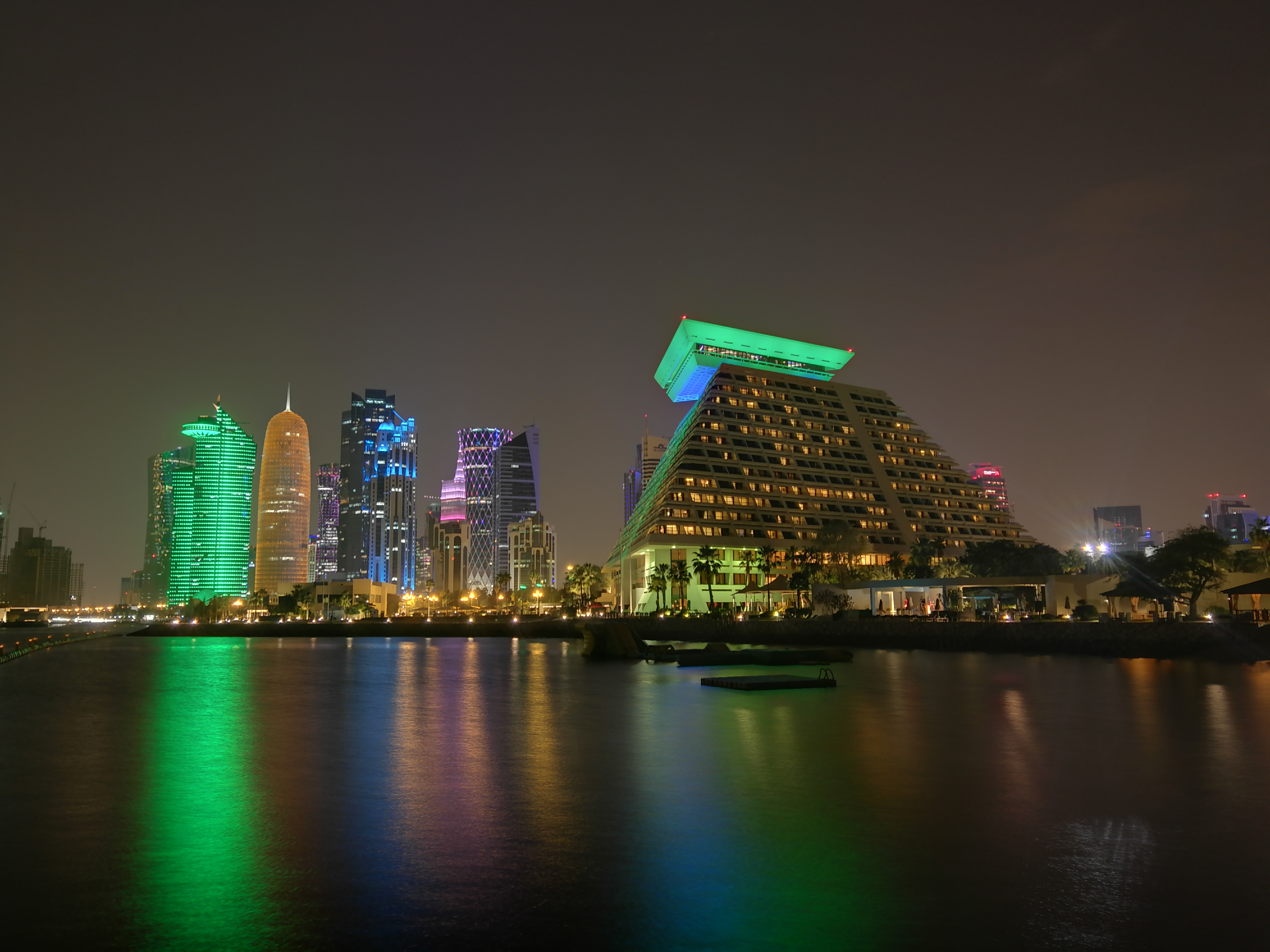
Night in Doha

Aspire Park and Aspire Tower a part of the Aspire zone.

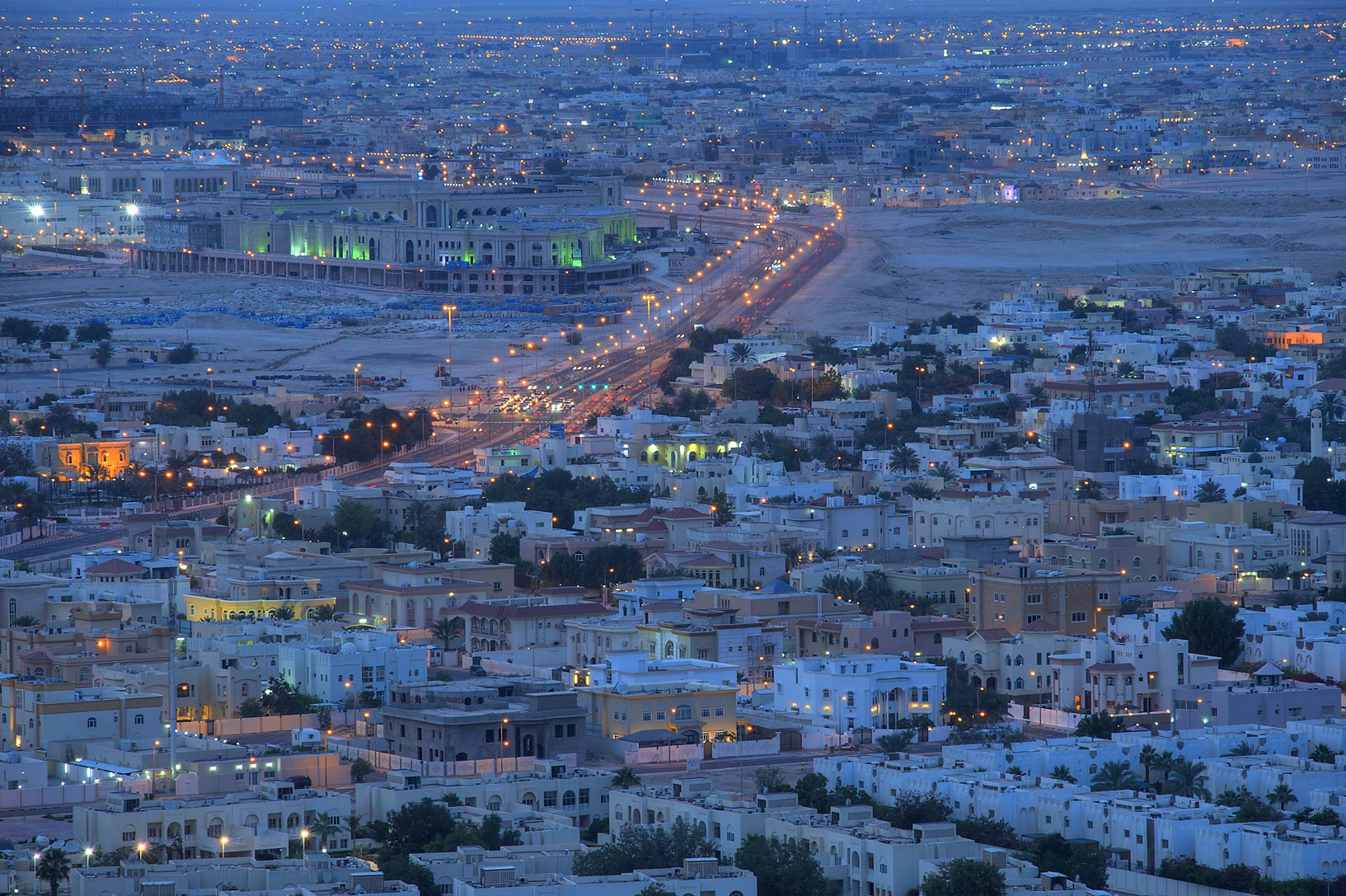
Aerial view of a part of the city

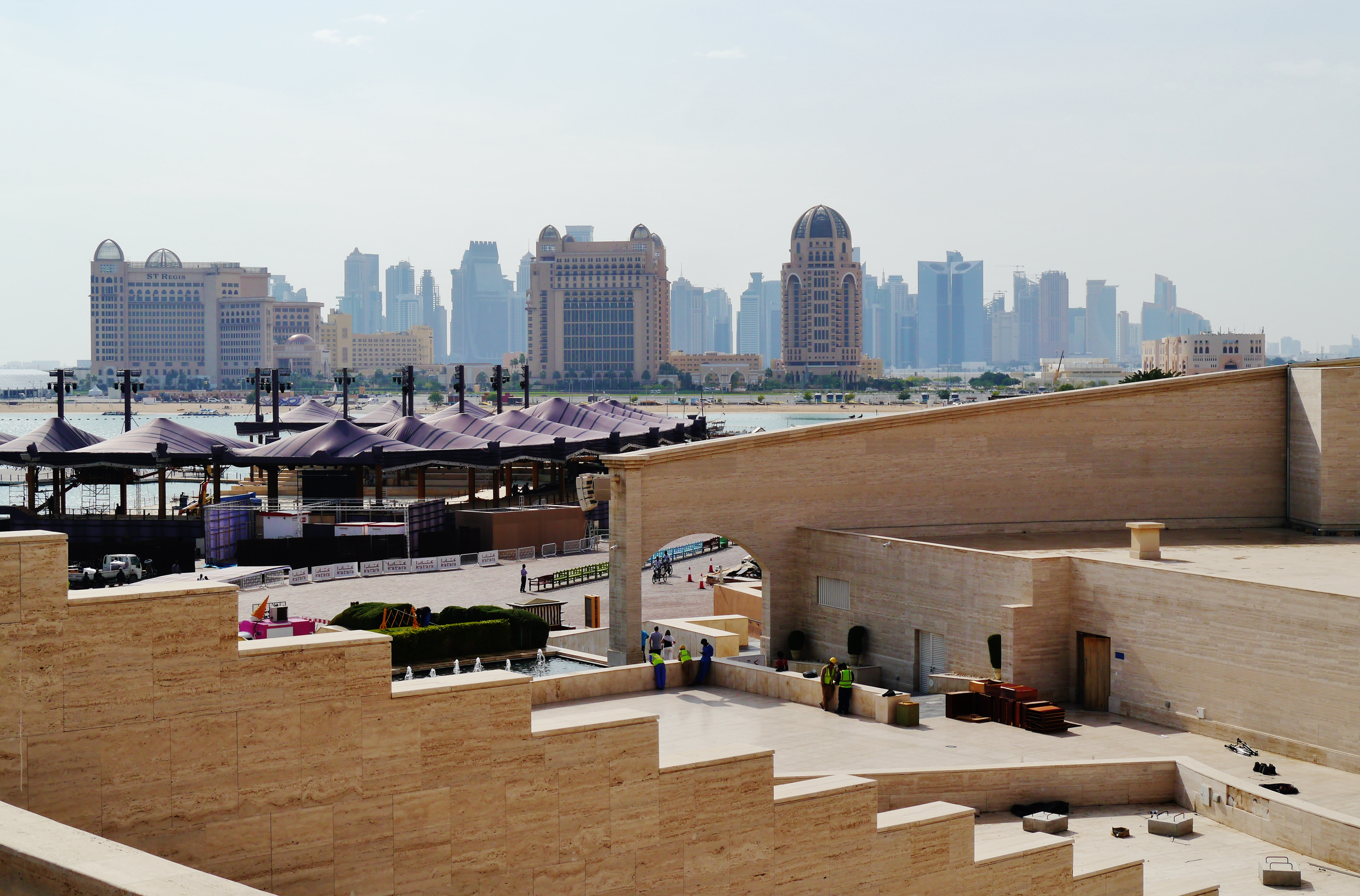
The Katara Cultural Village is designed to be a hub of human interaction connecting theatre, literature, music, visual art, conventions and exhibitions in a planned development on the waterfront.

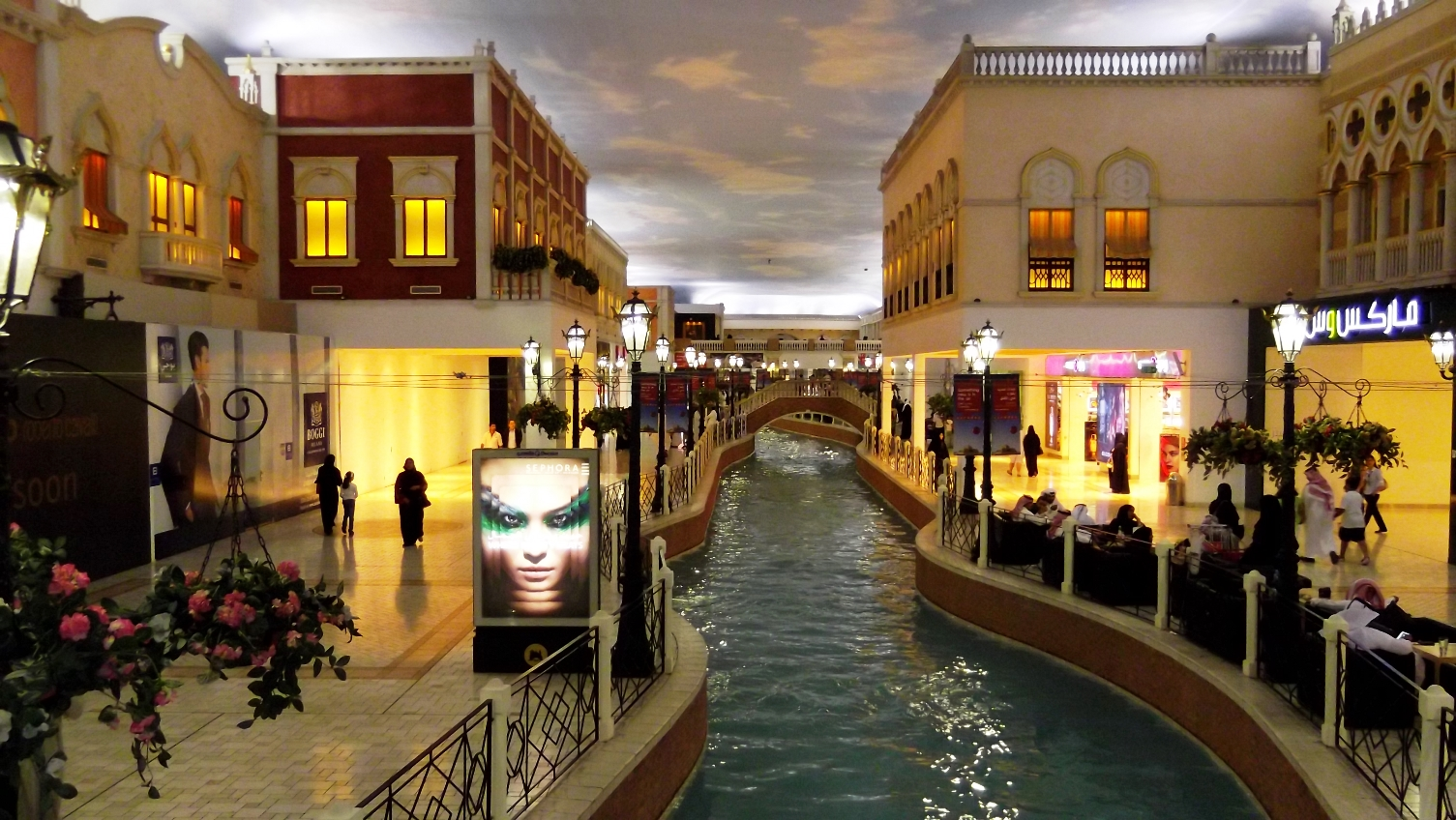
The Villaggio Mall

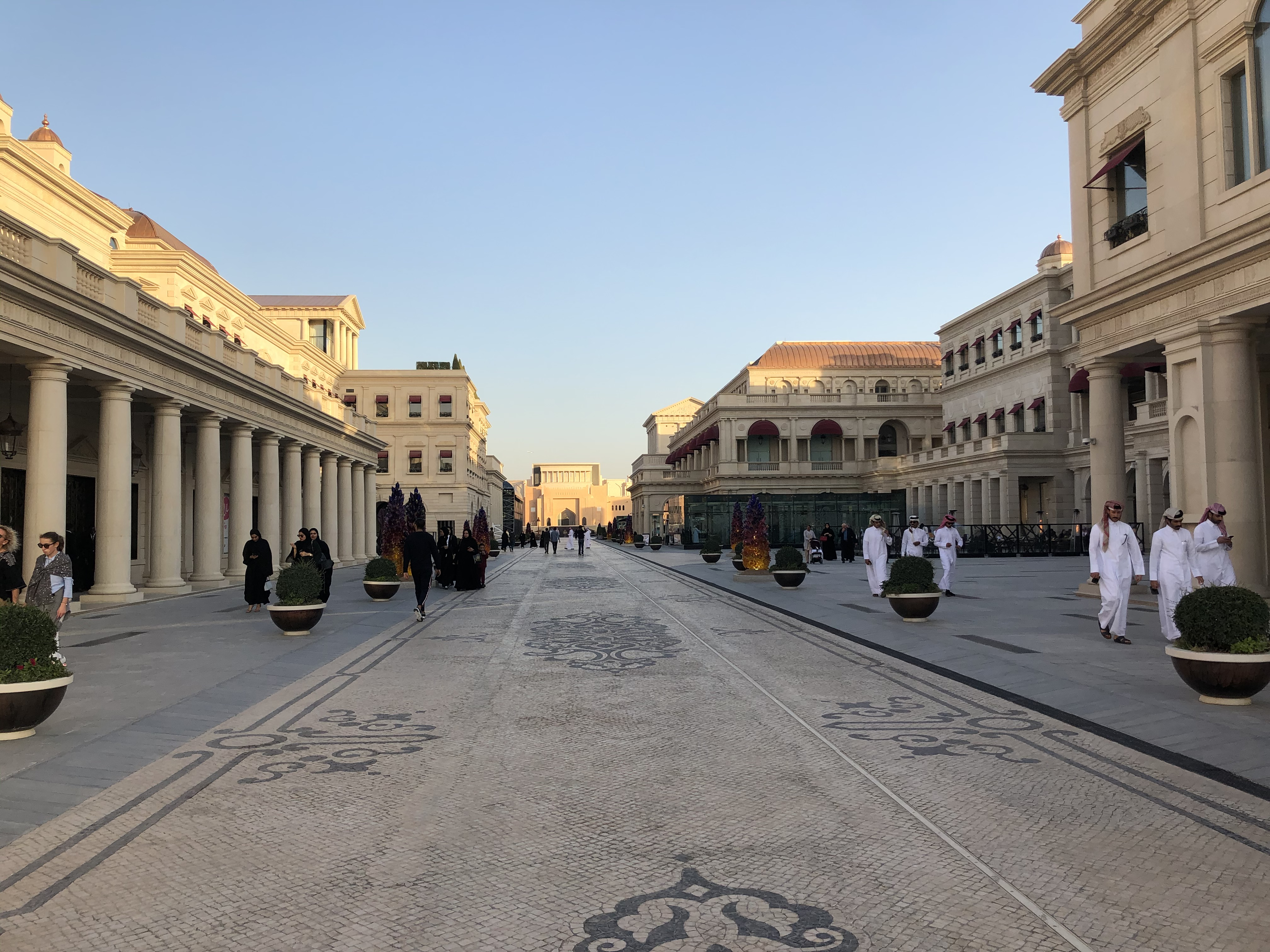
Central plaza at Katara Cultural Village

Msheireb Enrichment Centre moored off Doha Corniche is a learning center focused on the history and developments of Doha, particularly the Musheirib district.

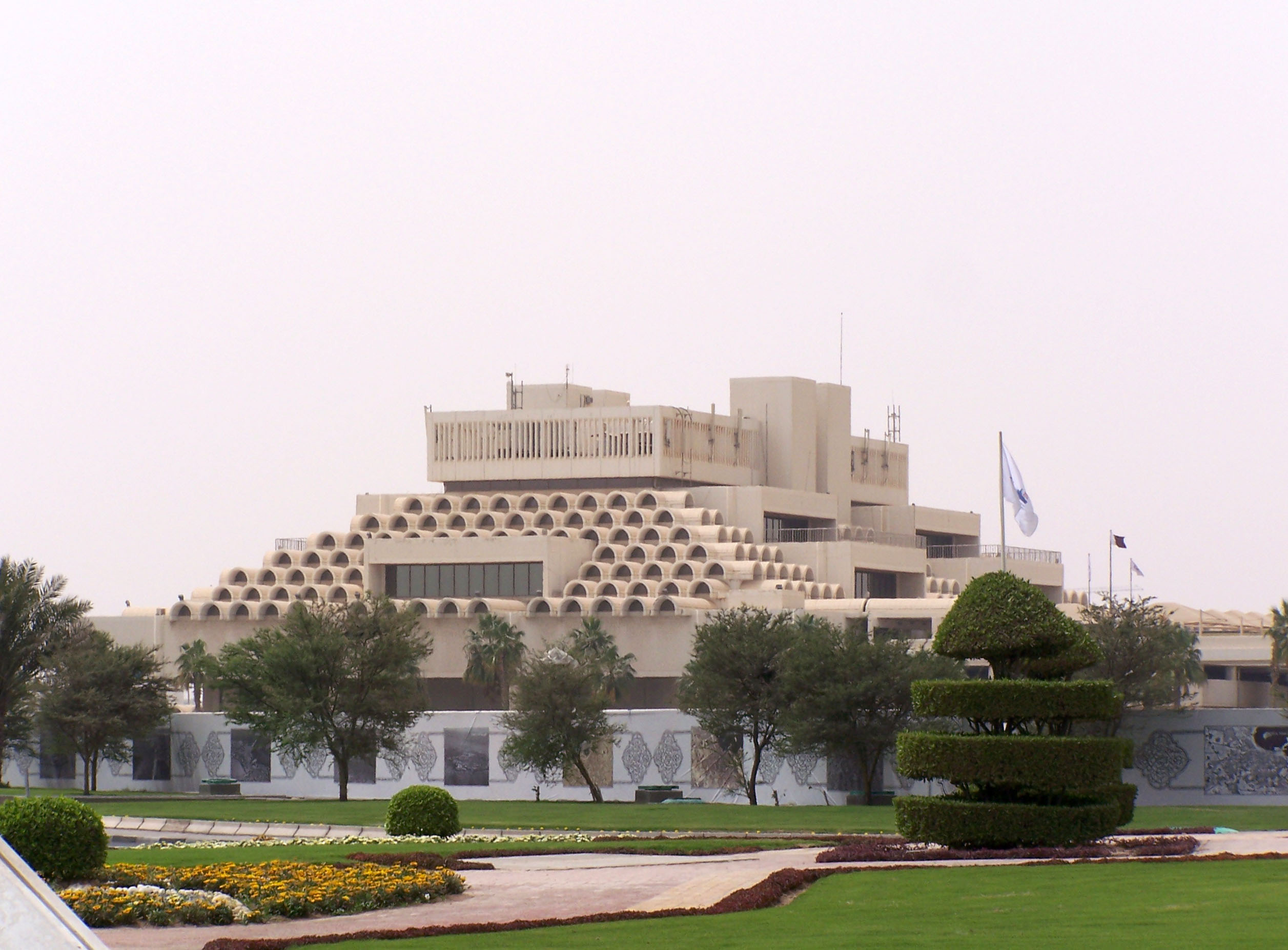
The post office building in Qatar sits located on the main Corniche street.

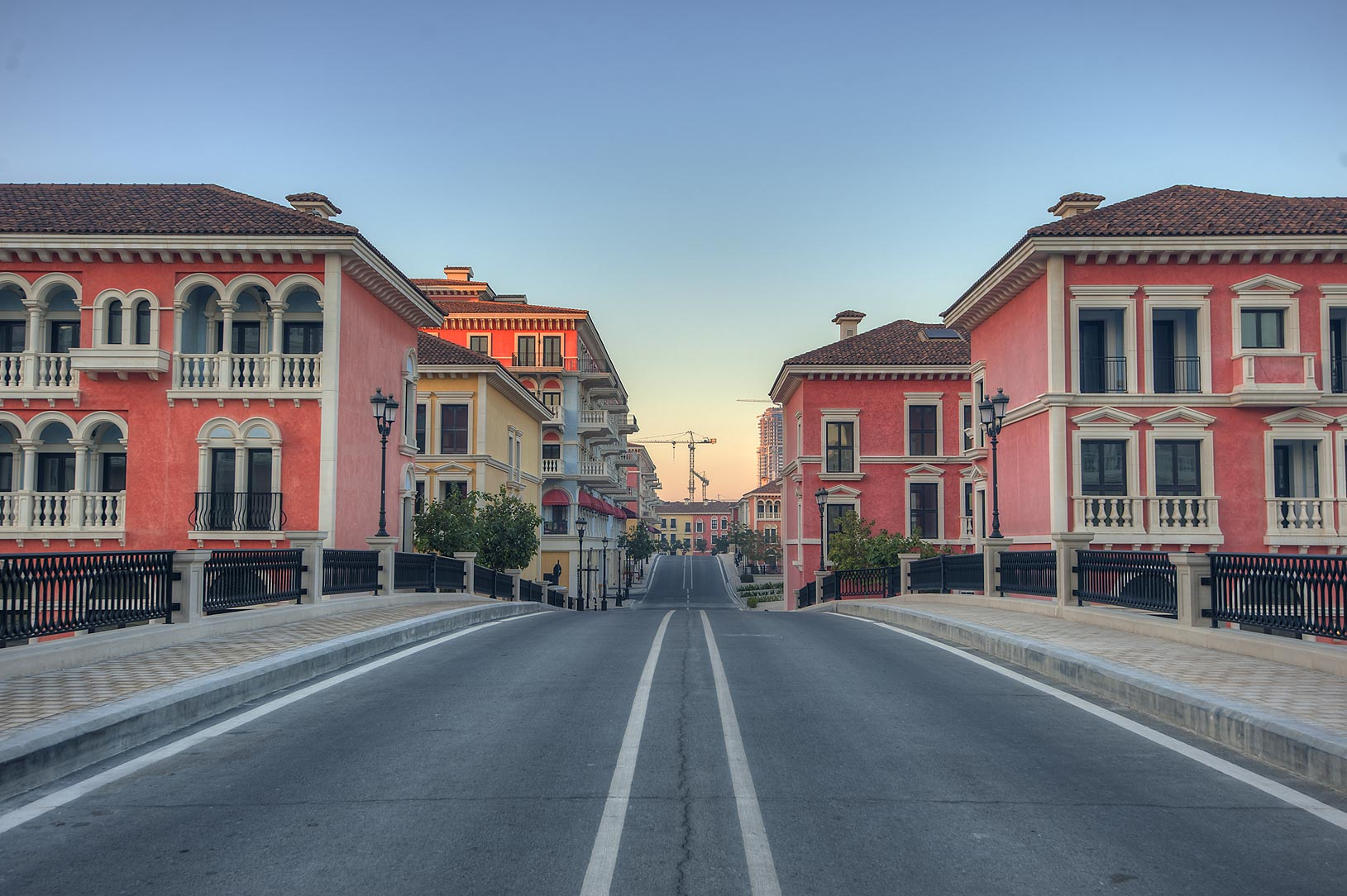
Qanat Quartier at The Pearl Island

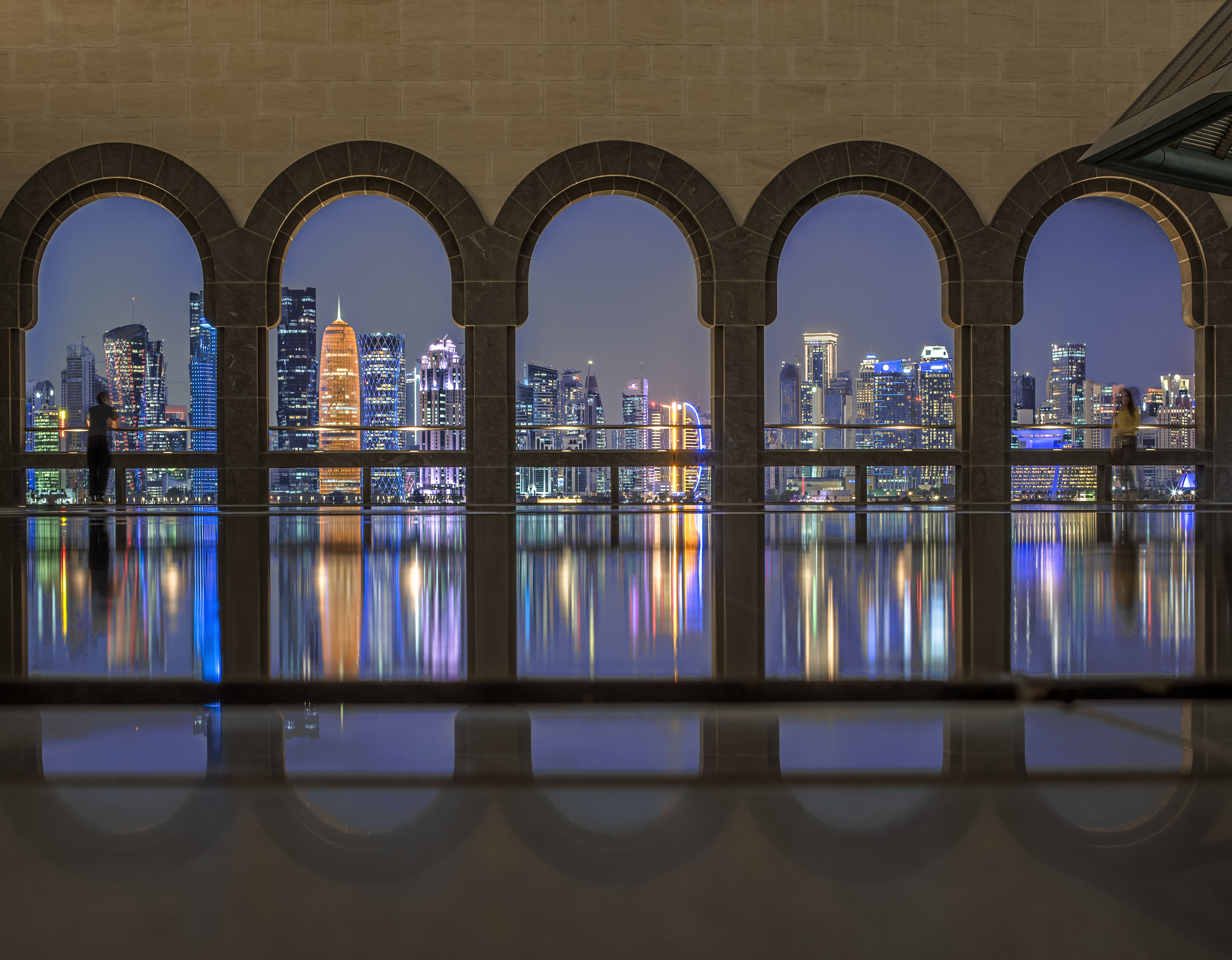
Doha skyline from the Museum of Islamic Art

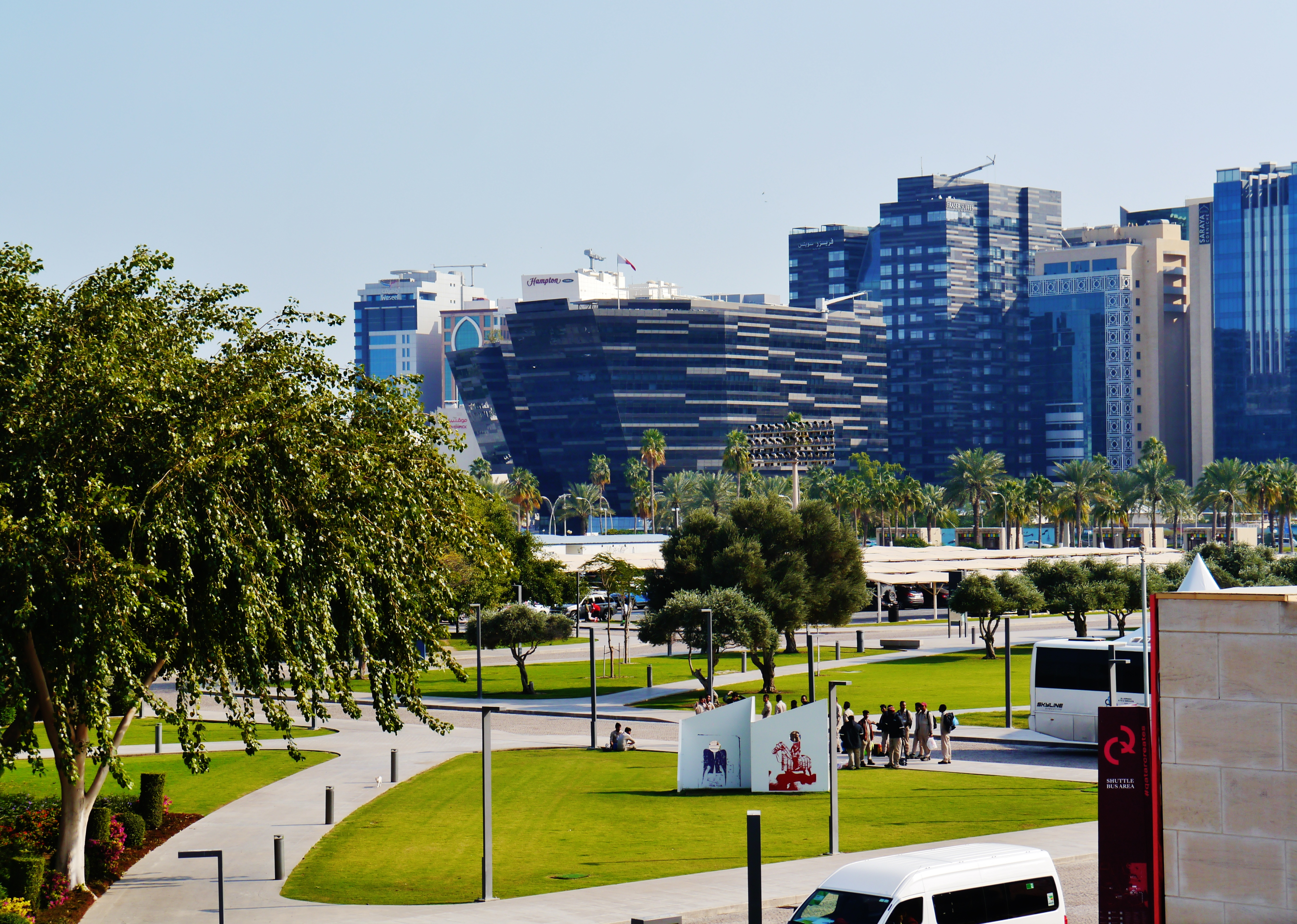
MIA Park in Doha

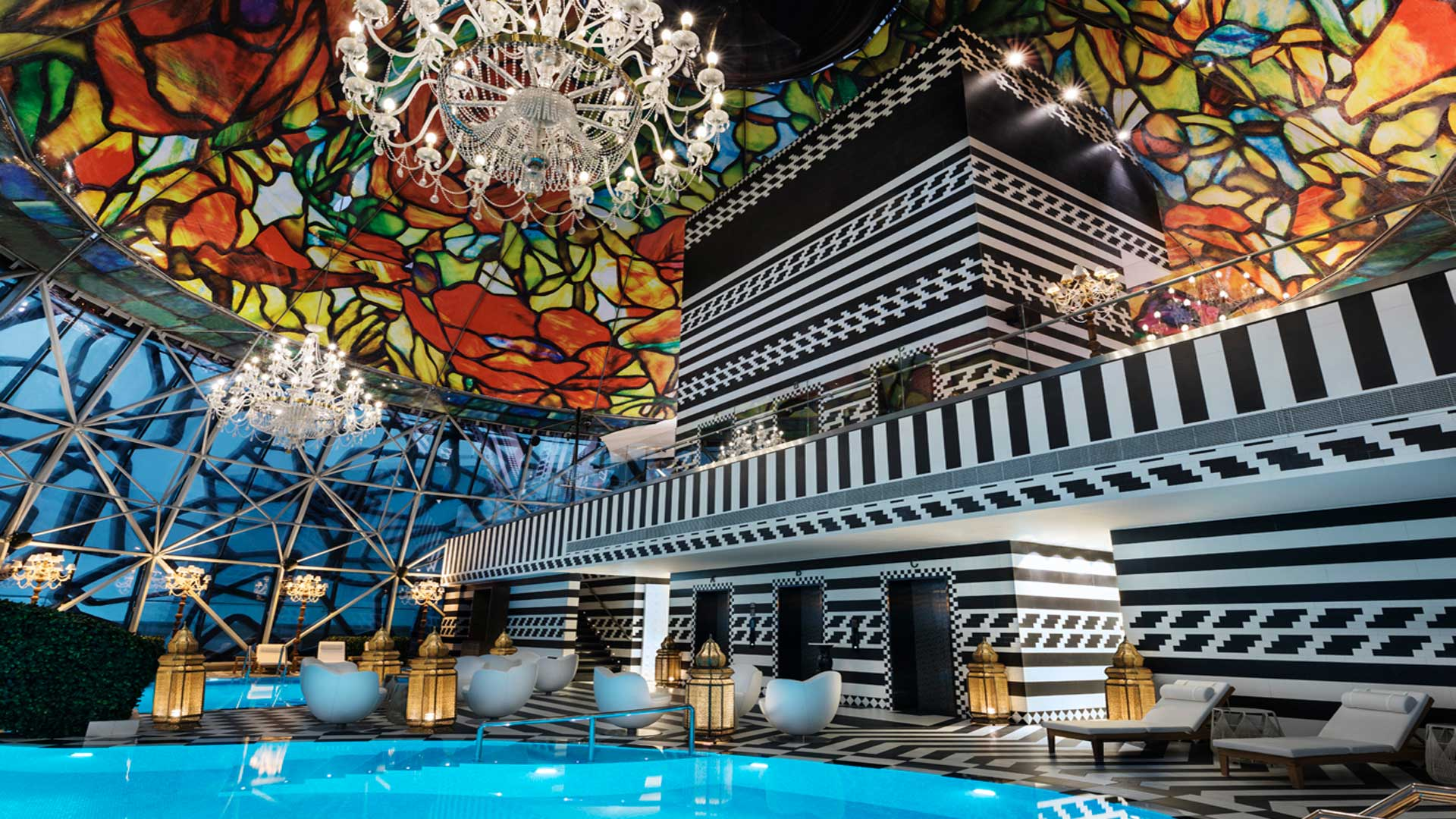
Mondrian Doha

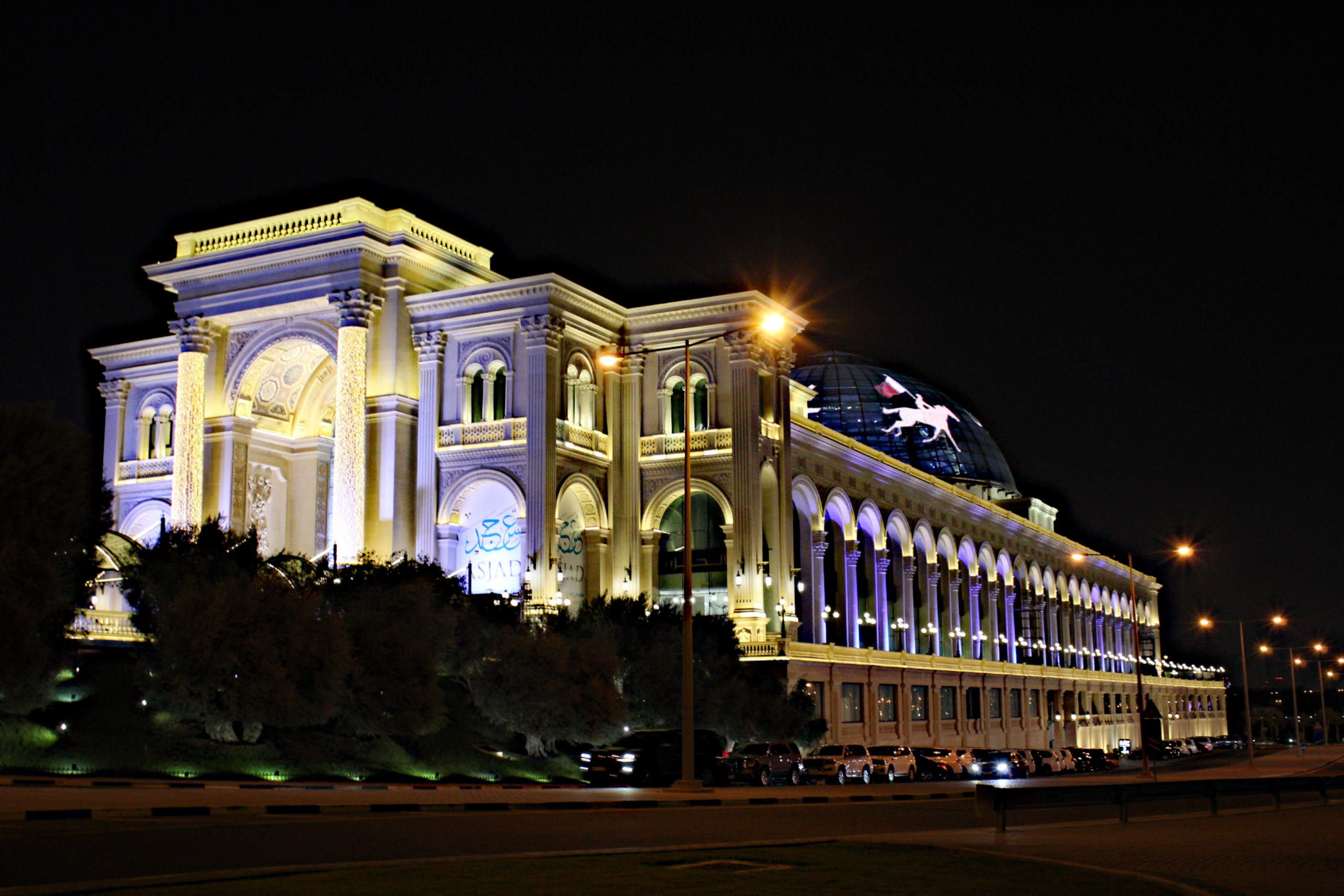
Al Hazm Mall at Night

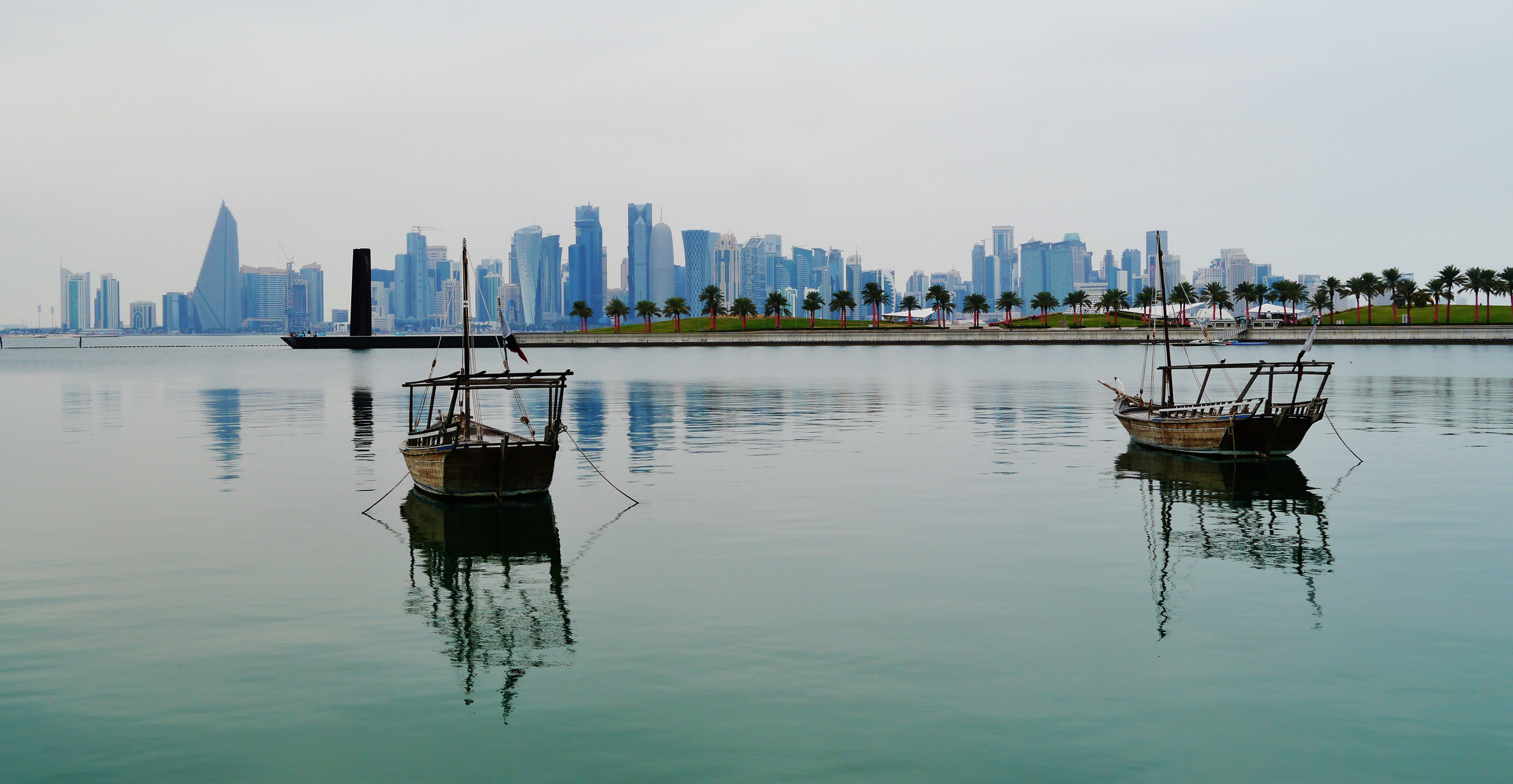
Doha Skyline with Historic Boats

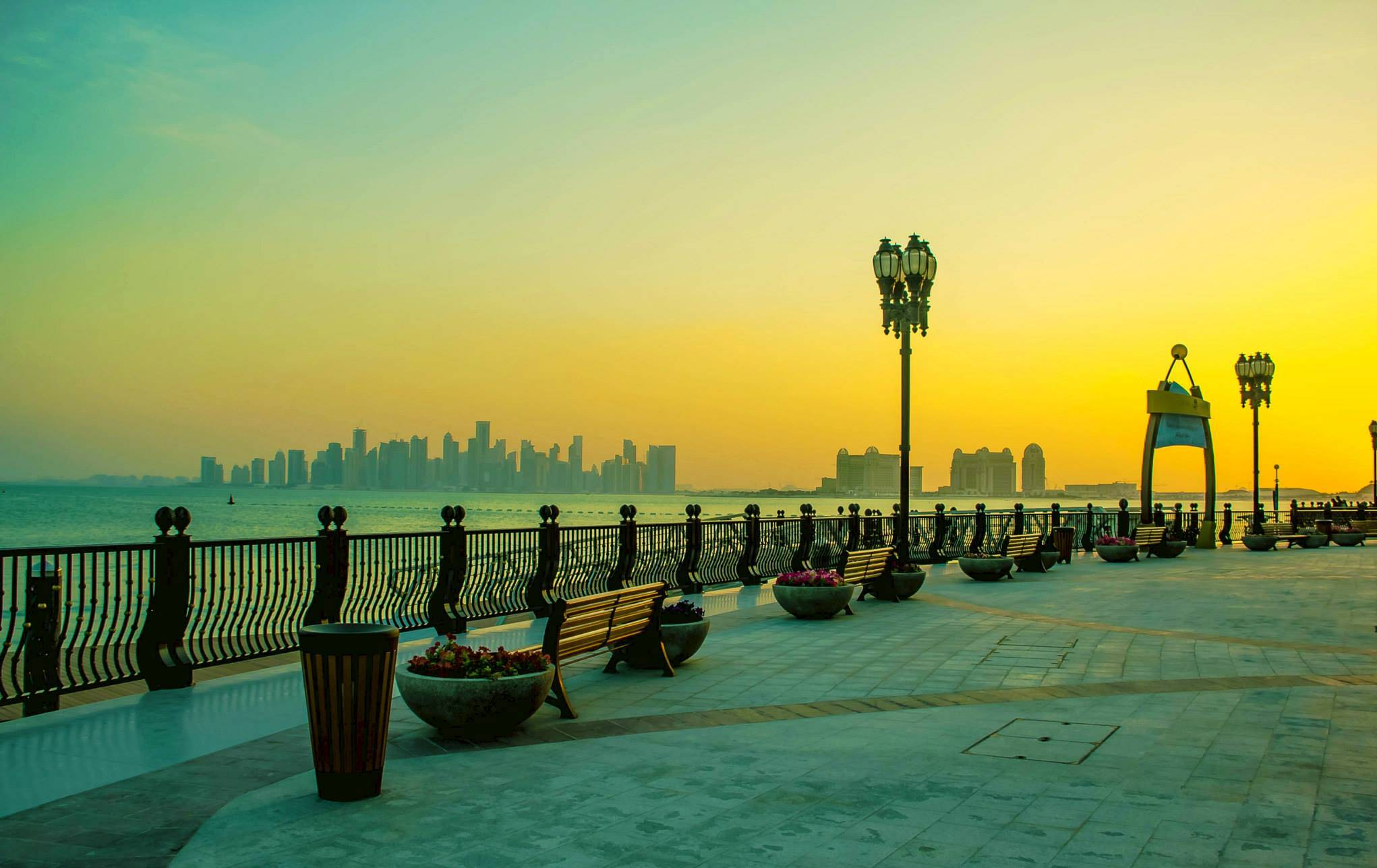
Evening sunset over Doha

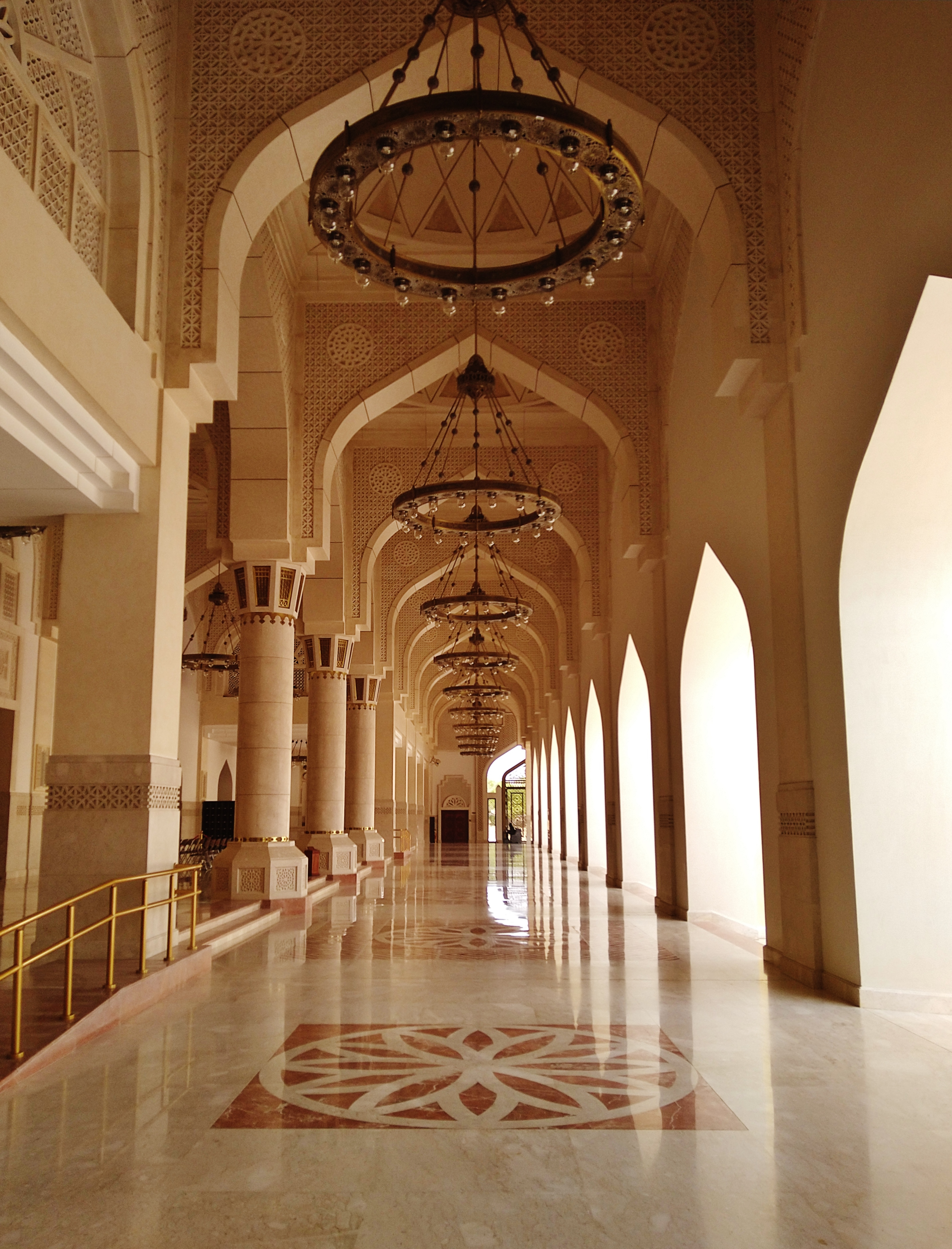
Iconic Mosque in Doha

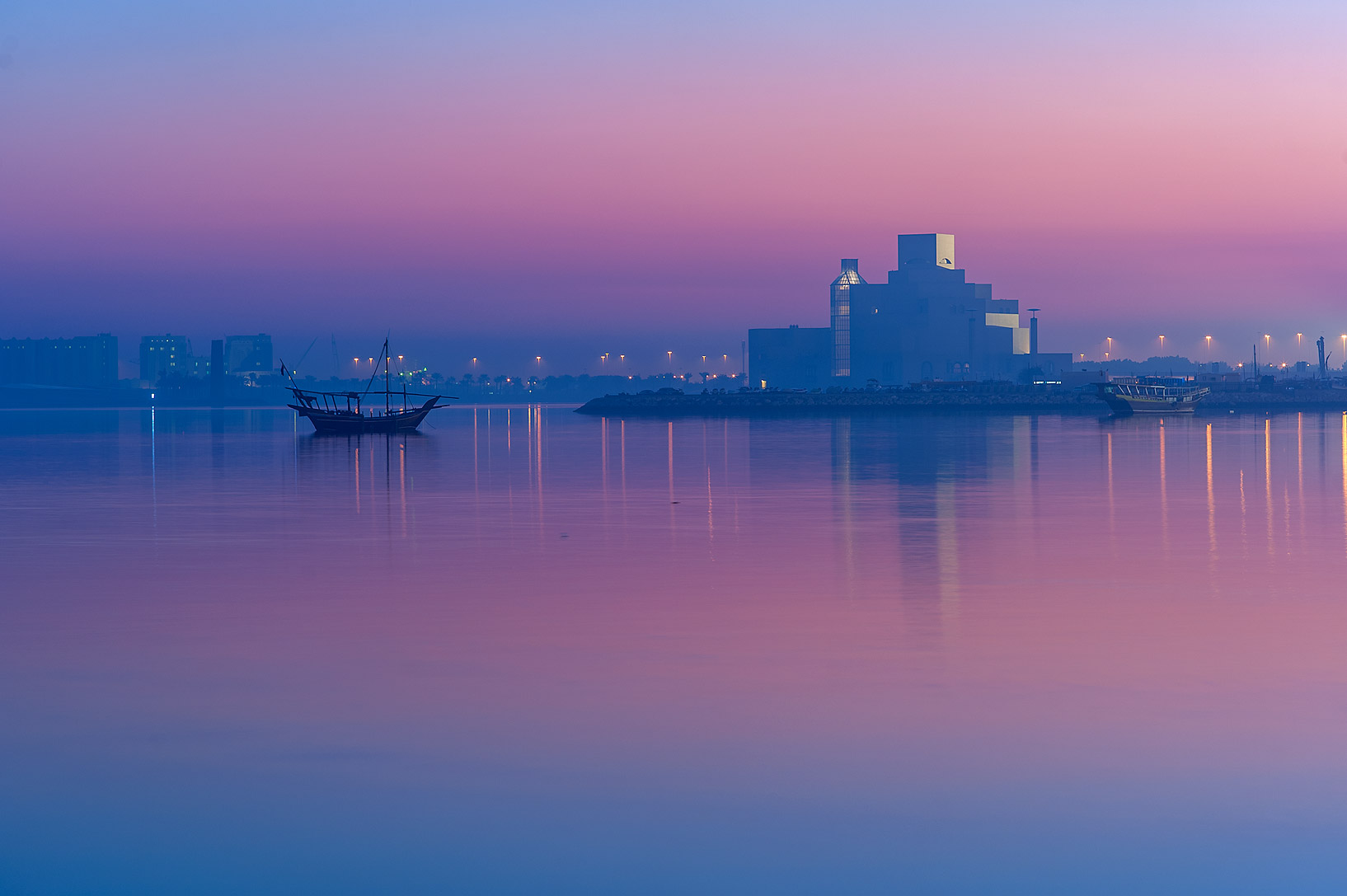
View of the Persian Gulf and the Museum of Islamic Art in Qatar at dusk

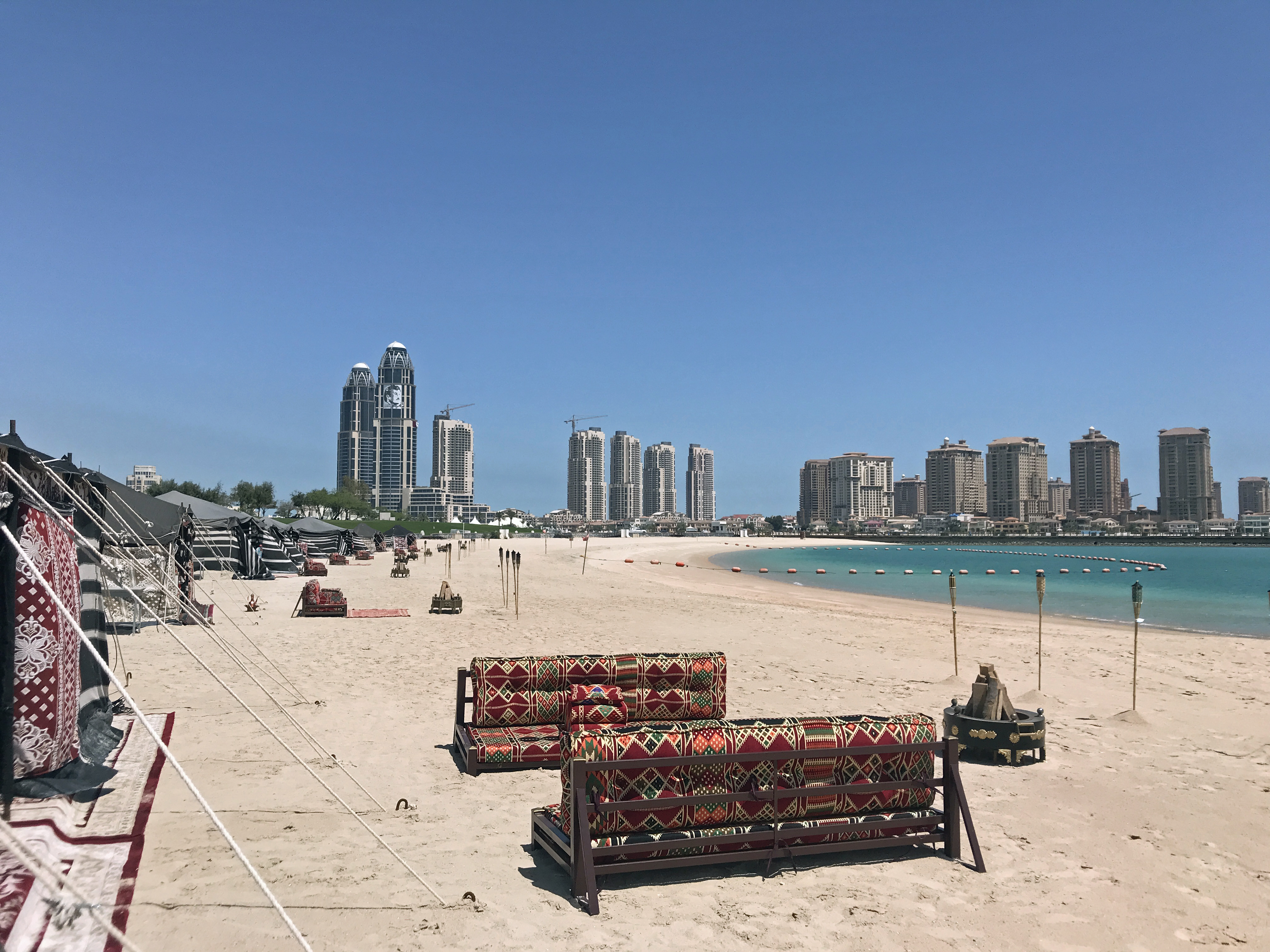
Beach in Doha

== Notable people ==
- Nourah Al Saad (born 1964) – writer

== See also ==
- Timeline of Doha
- Doha Declaration
- Doha Development Round of World Trade Organization (WTO) talks
- Qatar National Day, which is held in Doha every year on 18 December
