= Timeline of Doha =

The following is a timeline of the history of the city of Doha, Qatar.

== Prior to 20th century ==
- 1681 - Earliest documented mention of Al Bidda (now part of Doha).
- 1801 - Earliest description of Al Bidda and first attempt by the British to attack the city.
- 1820 - Population: 10,000 (estimate).
- 1821 - Al Bidda bombarded by the British as punishment for piracy.
- 1820s - Doha founded as an offshoot of Al Bidda.
- 1823 - Doha is mapped for the first time.
- 1828 - Ruling tribe of Doha have their fort bombarded by the Al Khalifa and are evicted from the town.
- 1841 - Al Bidda bombarded by the British as punishment for harboring pirate Jasim bin Jabir.
- 1848–50 - Al Thani family migrate to Doha.
- 1850 - Turkish fort built.
- 1852 - Economic blockade placed on Doha and Al Bidda by the Al Khalifa.
- 1867 - Doha sacked during the Qatari–Bahraini War.
- 1871 - Doha occupied by Turks.
- 1893
  - Al Bidda townspeople fired at indiscriminately by the Ottoman troops during the Battle of Al Wajbah.
  - Population: 6,000 (estimate).

== 20th century ==
- 1901 - Fariq Al-Salata Palace built.
- 1910 - Barzan Tower built near Doha.
- 1927 - Al Koot Fort built.
- 1952
  - Establishment of first formal boys' school.
  - Population: 10,000 (estimate).
- 1955 - Establishment of first formal girls' school.
- 1963
  - Population: 45,000 (estimate).
  - Doha (municipality) created.
- 1969
  - Al Sadd Sports Club formed.
  - Government House built.
- 1971 - Doha officially declared as the capital city of Qatar.
- 1972 - Amiri Diwan (palace) built.
- 1973 - Qatar University opened in Doha.
- 1975
  - Qatar News Agency headquartered in city.
  - Qatar National Museum opens in the Fariq Al-Salata Palace.
- 1976 - National Stadium opens.
- 1977 - Qatar University active.
- 1978 - Gulf Times begins publication.
- 1981 - Persian Gulf States Folk Heritage Center established.
- 1983
  - Doha Zoo built.
  - A 15-storey Sheraton hotel building, the tallest structure in Doha until 1997, is built.
- 1985 - Said Bin Sumich Mosque built.
- 1988 - American School of Doha established.
- 1995 - FIFA World Youth Championship is hosted exclusively in Doha-based stadiums.
- 1996
  - Al Jazeera television begins broadcasting.
  - Doha Golf Club opens.
- 1997 - Doha British School opens.
- 2000 - Landmark Mall Doha in business.

== 21st century ==
- 2001 - November: World Trade Organization Ministerial Conference of 2001 held in Doha; "Doha Declaration" adopted.
- 2004
  - Assassination of Zelimkhan Yandarbiyev
- 2005
  - Doha Sports City opens.
  - Doha Modern Indian School established.
- 2006
  - December: 2006 Asian Games held in Doha.
  - Fanar Islamic Cultural Centre established (approximate date).
  - Villaggio Mall in business.
  - Development of The Pearl Island artificial island begins.
  - Qatar Canadian School and Virginia Commonwealth University in Qatar art gallery established.
- 2007
  - Doha bid for the 2016 Summer Olympics announced.
  - Aspire Tower built.
  - Dubai Towers Doha construction begins.
- 2008
  - Museum of Islamic Art, Doha opens.
  - Doha International Maritime Defence Exhibition begins.
  - Tornado Tower built.
  - Souq Waqif (market) reconstructed.
- 2009
  - Doha Tribeca Film Festival begins.
  - Doha News blog begins publication.
  - Commercialbank Plaza and Al Fardan Residences built.
  - Al Quds Endowment Tower and Qatar National Bank Tower construction begins.
- 2010
  - Mathaf museum opens.
  - Population: 796,947.
  - Qatar 2022 FIFA World Cup bid selected.
  - Katara Cultural Village opens.
- 2011
  - December: 2011 Pan Arab Games held in Doha.
  - Boeing office in business.
- 2012
  - February: National Sports Day begins.
  - 28 May: Fire at Villaggio Mall.
  - Burj Qatar built.
  - Air pollution in Doha reaches annual mean of 93 PM2.5 and 168 PM10, much higher than recommended.
- 2013
  - Qatar Ministry of Development Planning and Statistics headquartered in Doha.
  - Statue of Zinedine Zidane installed on the Corniche, then removed.
- 2014 - Hamad International Airport begins operating.
- 2015 - Population: 956,457.
- 2016 - 8 March: Tiger roams free on Doha Expressway; later recaptured.
- 2019 - Doha Metro begins operating.
- 2022 - Hosted 2022 FIFA World Cup

== See also ==
- Doha history

== Bibliography ==
- British Admiralty (1916). "El-Qatar: Towns and Villages: Dohah". Handbook of Arabia. Vol. 1. London: British War Office. hdl:2027/njp.32101006882755.
- Yasser Elsheshtawy, ed. (2008). "Rediscovering the island: Doha's urbanity from pearls to spectacle". The Evolving Arab City: Tradition, Modernity and Urban Development. Routledge. ISBN 978-1-134-12821-1.
- Angie Turner (2008), "Doha", in Michael R.T. Dumper; Bruce E. Stanley (eds.), Cities of the Middle East and North Africa, USA: ABC-CLIO, p. 136+, ISBN 9781576079195
- "Doha". Oman, UAE & Arabian Peninsula. Lonely Planet. 2010. p. 272+. ISBN 978-1-74179-145-7.
- Ashraf M. Salama; Florian Wiedmann (2013). Demystifying Doha: On Architecture and Urbanism in an Emerging City. Ashgate. ISBN 978-1-4094-6636-9.
