= List of tallest buildings in Qatar =

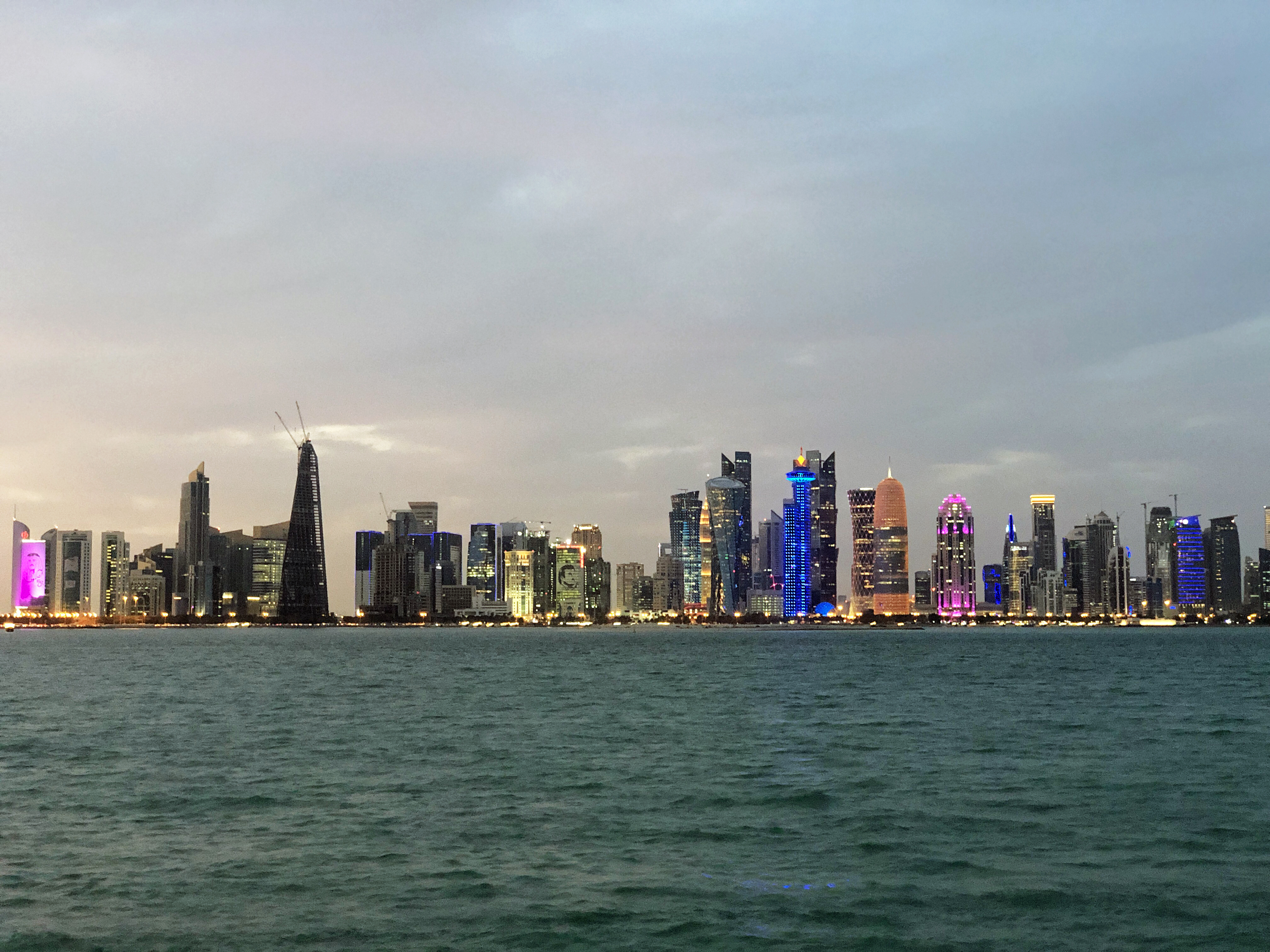
Doha Skyline in 2020

This is a list of the tallest buildings in Qatar. Most of the skyscrapers in Doha are located in the zone of West Bay. The tallest building in Doha is Aspire Tower and tallest building in Lusail is Lusail Plaza Towers. Apart from the current tallest buildings in the city, there are five supertall skyscrapers on hold. Doha as the center of Qatar skyscrapers, is a rapidly growing city, with many of its tallest skyscrapers having been finished in the last ten years. Doha is the tallest city in Middle East after Dubai.

== Completed buildings ==
Was the tallest building in Qatar upon completion

This list includes the completed or topped-out buildings in Doha and Lusail.

=== > 150 meters ===
Name	Image	Height m (ft)	Floors	Year	Location	Notes
Lusail Plaza Tower 3		301 m (988 ft)	75	2023	Lusail; 25.2536°N 51.30215°E	Tallest buildings in Lusail City and subsequently in Qatar.
Lusail Plaza Tower 4		301 m (988 ft)	75	2023	Lusail; 25.2536°N 51.30215°E	Tallest buildings in Lusail City and subsequently in Qatar.
Aspire Tower		300 metres (980 ft)	50	2007	Doha; 25.15449°N 51.26414°E	Tallest buildings in Doha
Al Fardan Residences		254 metres (833 ft)	64	2009	West Bay (Doha); 25.32870°N 51.53118°E	
Al Mana Tower		247 metres (810 ft)	57	2023	West Bay (Doha); 25.31389°N 51.52124°E	
Palm Tower A		245 metres (804 ft)	57	2011	West Bay (Doha); 25.31825°N 51.52666°E	
Palm Tower B		245 metres (804 ft)	57	2011	West Bay (Doha); 25.31825°N 51.52666°E	
World Trade Center Doha		241 metres (791 ft)	51	2013	West Bay (Doha); 25.3135°N 51.5183°E	
Doha Tower		238 metres (781 ft)	46	2010	West Bay (Doha); 25.19310°N 51.31419°E	
Aleph Doha Residences		230 metres (750 ft)	33	2016	West Bay (Doha); 25.32726°N 51.53521°E	
Al Faisal Tower		227 metres (745 ft)	33	2011	West Bay (Doha); 25.19313°N 51.31348°E	
Al-Asmakh Tower		227 metres (745 ft)	34	2017	West Bay (Doha); 25.19957°N 51.31324°E	
Qatar Petroleum District Tower 7		223 metres (732 ft)	47	2016	West Bay (Doha); 25.31670°N 51.51897°E	
InterContinental Doha The City		221 metres (725 ft)	60	2012	West Bay (Doha); 25.32666°N 51.52483°E	
Darwish Tower		220 metres (720 ft)	55	2022	West Bay (Doha); 25.32634°N 51.53762°E	
JW Marriott Tower Hotel		216 metres (709 ft)	52	2023	West Bay (Doha)	
Lusail Plaza Tower 1		215 metres (705 ft)	50	2023	Lusail; 25.2536°N 51.30215°E	
Lusail Plaza Tower 2		215 metres (705 ft)	50	2023	Lusail; 25.2536°N 51.30215°E	
Lusail Katara Hotel North Tower		211 metres (692 ft)	39	2022	Lusail; 25.23216°N 51.31533°E	
Lusail Katara Hotel South Tower		211 metres (692 ft)	39	2022	Lusail; 25.23216°N 51.31533°E	
Navigation Tower		209 metres (686 ft)	50	2008	West Bay (Doha); 25.32171°N 51.52730°E	
Pullman Doha West Bay		208 metres (682 ft)	52	2020	West Bay (Doha); 25.32402°N 51.52641°E	
West Bay Office Tower		208 metres (682 ft)	52	2020	West Bay (Doha)	
Al Baker Hotel Towers 2		203 metres (666 ft)	47	2023	West Bay (Doha); 25.32665°N 51.53155°E	
Abraj Quartier Gateway Towers		202 metres (663 ft)	43	2016	The Pearl Island, Doha	
City Center Rotana Doha		200 metres (660 ft)	58	2014	West Bay (Doha); 25.32450°N 51.53336°E	
Shangri-La City Center		200 metres (660 ft)	58	2014	West Bay (Doha); 25.32450°N 51.53336°E	
Merweb Hotel City Center		200 metres (660 ft)	51	2014	West Bay (Doha); 25.32450°N 51.53336°E	
Marriott Marquis City Center Hotel North Tower		200 metres (660 ft)	50	2011	West Bay (Doha); 25.32508°N 51.52808°E	
Marriott Marquis City Center Hotel South Tower		200 metres (660 ft)	50	2011	West Bay (Doha); 25.32508°N 51.52808°E	
Al Rabban Towers (Voco Doha West Bay Suites)		200 metres (660 ft)	29	2007	West Bay (Doha)	
Al Bidda Tower		197 metres (646 ft)	43	2010	West Bay (Doha); 25.18583°N 51.31332°E	
Samrya Twin Towers East		196 metres (643 ft)	41	2012	West Bay (Doha); 25.33041°N 51.52985°E	
Samrya Twin Towers West		196 metres (643 ft)	41	2012	West Bay (Doha); 25.33041°N 51.52985°E	
Tornado Tower		195 metres (640 ft)	52	2008	West Bay (Doha); 25.1909°N 51.3140°E	
Waldorf Astoria Hotel		192 metres (630 ft)	45	2021	West Bay (Doha)	
Qatar International Islamic Bank HQ Tower		191 metres (627 ft)	45	2014	West Bay (Doha)	
Al Baker Hotel Towers 1		190 metres (620 ft)	53	2023	West Bay (Doha); 25.32664°N 51.53155°E	
Dusit Hotel & Suites Doha		190 metres (620 ft)	50	2017	West Bay (Doha); 25.32789°N 51.53206°E	
The Vyra Suites Hotel		189 metres (620 ft)	45	2019	Doha	
Abdul al-Attah Residential Tower		188 metres (617 ft)	46	2006	Doha	
Corniche Park Towers (QIMC Tower)		186 metres (610 ft)	43	2024	West Bay (Doha); 25.31576°N 51.52424°E	
Centara West Bay Hotel & Residences		186 metres (610 ft)	42	2018	West Bay (Doha); 25.32827°N 51.53652°E	
Al Jassimya Tower		184 metres (604 ft)	42	2013	West Bay (Doha); 25.31844°N 51.52874°E	
West Bay 44 Ras Tower		180 metres (590 ft)	49	2009	West Bay (Doha); 25.33036°N 51.53415°E	
Bentley Luxury Hotel and Suites		180 metres (590 ft)	44	2020	West Bay (Doha)	
Wyndham Grand Doha West Bay Beach		180 metres (590 ft)	37	2018	West Bay (Doha)	
Al Fardan Towers 1		178 metres (584 ft)	40	2007	West Bay (Doha); 25.32150°N 51.52914°E	
Element by Westin Doha		176 metres (577 ft)	39	2016	West Bay (Doha)	
Crowne Plaza Doha		175 metres (574 ft)	45	2009	Doha	
Woqod Tower		174 metres (571 ft)	32	2012	West Bay (Doha)	
Awqaf Tower (AKH Tower)		172 metres (564 ft)	39	2010	West Bay (Doha)	
Ocean View		172 metres (564 ft)	44	2003	Doha	
Element West Bay		170 metres (560 ft)	33	2022	West Bay (Doha)	
Rosewood Doha Twin Towers 1		170 metres (560 ft)	40	2025	Lusail	
Burj Al Marina		163 metres (535 ft)	39	2018	Lusail	
The E18hteen Tower		163 metres (535 ft)	36	2017	Lusail	
Al Jazeera Tower		162 metres (531 ft)	37	2007	West Bay (Doha)	
Al Dareen Tower		160 metres (520 ft)	36	2012	West Bay (Doha)	
Qatar Telecom Headquarters (Ooredoo Tower)		158 metres (518 ft)	29	2004	West Bay (Doha); 25.32306°N 51.53760°E	
Bin Samikh Tower		158 metres (518 ft)	42	2014	West Bay (Doha)	
Kahramaa HQ Tower (Al Rames)		158 metres (518 ft)	36	2010	West Bay (Doha)	
Laffan Tower		158 metres (518 ft)	36	2009	West Bay (Doha)	
Rosewood Doha Twin Towers 2		157 metres (515 ft)	37	2025	Lusail	
West Bay Tower		155 metres (509 ft)	35	1999	West Bay (Doha)	
Mondrian Doha Hotel (Falcon Tower)		155 metres (509 ft)	27	2017	West Bay Lagoon Doha	
Delta Hotels Marriott City Center		152 metres (499 ft)	32	2013	Doha	
State Audit Bureau Tower A		152 metres (499 ft)	31	2017	Doha	
Manarat Tower		150 metres (490 ft)	34	2018	Lusail	
Burj Damac Sea View		150 metres (490 ft)	31	2024	Lusail	
Commercial Bank Office Headquarters		150 metres (490 ft)	20	2006	Doha	
Al Marina Twin Towers		150 metres (490 ft)	33	2015	Lusail	
Al Abdul Wahab Gholam Towers		150 metres (490 ft)	39	2020	Doha	

=== 90–149 meters ===
Tower name	image	Height (metres/feet)	Stories	Location (city)	Use	Year completed
City Tower		149 metres (489 ft)	34	Doha	Office	2013
Commercialbank Plaza		148 metres (486 ft)	22	Doha	Office	2009
Dafna Tower 4		144 metres (472 ft)	36	Doha	Hotel	2006
Logoona Mall Tower A		143 metres (469 ft)	35	Doha	Residential	2010
Logoona Mall Tower B		143 metres (469 ft)	35	Doha	Residential	2010
Governor West Bay		142 metres (466 ft)	32	Doha	Hotel	2014
Skala Tower		140 metres (460 ft)	35	Lusail	Residential	2025
Qatar Petroleum District Tower 6		140 metres (460 ft)	32	Doha	Office	2016
State Audit Bureau Tower B		140 metres (460 ft)	30	Doha	Office	2017
Al Sahab Tower		140 metres (460 ft)	32	Doha	Office	2009
Lusail Waterfront Tower		140 metres (460 ft)	33	Lusail	Hotel	2019
Areen Residential Tower		140 metres (460 ft)	31	Doha	Residential	2008
Al Fardan Towers 2		140 metres (460 ft)	32	Doha	Office	2007
Al Nasr Twin Towers		140 metres (460 ft)	24	Doha	Office	2003
Jaidah Tower		138 metres (453 ft)	30	Doha	Office	1980
Al Marina Twin Towers		138 metres (453 ft)	36	Lusail	Office	2017
Dafna Tower 3		136 metres (446 ft)	32	Doha	Residential	2006
Dafna Tower 2		136 metres (446 ft)	32	Doha	Residential	2006
Dafna Tower 1		136 metres (446 ft)	32	Doha	Hotel	2006
Diplomat Office Tower		136 metres (446 ft)	31	Doha	Office	2013
Burj Al Fardan		135 metres (443 ft)	32	Lusail	Office	2019
Al Rayyan Tower		134 metres (440 ft)	34	Doha	Residential	2011
Crottwel Residence		133 metres (436 ft)	39	Doha	Residential	1998
QIG Tower		132 metres (433 ft)	27	Lusail	Office	2017
Marina 50 (QSAS)		132 metres (433 ft)	27	Lusail	Office	2015
Al Madar Tower		132 metres (433 ft)	30	Doha	Office	2009
Banyan Tree Doha		130 metres (430 ft)	30	Doha	Hotel	2021
Burj Damac Sea View		130 metres (430 ft)	31	Lusail	Hotel	2024
Union Trust Office Tower		128 metres (420 ft)	31	Lusail	Office	2022
Qatar Petroleum District Tower 8		127 metres (417 ft)	29	Doha	Office	2016
QNOC Tower (Qatar Olympic Committee)		123 metres (404 ft)	28	Doha	Office	2003
Hilton Doha The Pearl		123 metres (404 ft)	38	Doha	Hotel	2020
Abraj Quartier AQ-3		123 metres (404 ft)	36	Doha	Residential	2018
Abraj Quartier AQ-4		123 metres (404 ft)	36	Doha	Residential	2018
Abraj Quartier AQ-5		123 metres (404 ft)	36	Doha	Residential	2018
Abraj Quartier AQ-6		123 metres (404 ft)	36	Doha	Residential	2018
Abraj Quartier AQ-7		123 metres (404 ft)	36	Doha	Residential	2018
Al Nakheel Tower (Ashghal Office)		123 metres (404 ft)	28	Doha	Office	2009
Al Noor Residential Tower		120 metres (390 ft)	29	Doha	Residential	2018
Y Tower		120 metres (390 ft)	30	Lusail	Office	2023
Abdullah Abdulghani Commercial Tower		119 metres (390 ft)	36	Doha	Residential	2010
Pinnacle Residences		118 metres (387 ft)	33	Doha	Residential	1995
Kahramaa New Tower		116 metres (381 ft)	20	Lusail	Office	2022
Doha Bank Tower		115 metres (377 ft)	27	Doha	Office	2015
Ritz Carlton Hotel		115 metres (377 ft)	27	Doha	Hotel	2000
Marina Tower 23		115 metres (377 ft)	28	Lusail	Residential	2022
Velero Hotel		114 metres (374 ft)	19	Lusail	Hotel	2021
Ministry of Transport Tower (Lotus Tower)		114 metres (374 ft)	26	Doha	Office	2012
Qatar Petroleum District Tower 4		113 metres (371 ft)	26	Doha	Office	2016
City Hotel		113 metres (371 ft)	28	Doha	Hotel	2004
Beach Tower		113 metres (371 ft)	33	Doha	Residential	2008
Wesaya Tower		112 metres (367 ft)	22	Doha	Office	2003
RasGas Tower		111 metres (364 ft)	28	Doha	Office	2008
Al Gassar Tower		110 metres (360 ft)	27	Doha	Office	2008
Rafal Tower		110 metres (360 ft)	26	Lusail	Office	2021
Dolphin Energy Tower		110 metres (360 ft)	25	Doha	Office	2006
Ministry of Environment Tower		110 metres (360 ft)	28	Doha	Office	2008
Al Seal Residential Tower		110 metres (360 ft)	32	Doha	Residential	2007
Qatar Petroleum District Hotel		110 metres (360 ft)	29	Doha	Hotel	2016
Hamad Port Control Tower		110 metres (360 ft)	20	Doha	Office	2019
Amwal Tower		110 metres (360 ft)	25	Doha	Office	2008
Qatar Petroleum District Tower 9		109 metres (358 ft)	25	Doha	Office	2016
W Doha Hotel & Residences		105 metres (344 ft)	28	Doha	Hotel	2009
Attiyah Tower		105 metres (344 ft)	24	Doha	Office	2008
Hilton Doha		105 metres (344 ft)	28	Doha	Hotel	2008
Al Majed Tower		105 metres (344 ft)	25	Lusial	Office	2023
Andaz Doha		104 metres (341 ft)	22	Doha	Hotel	2024
Beverly Hills Tower		104 metres (341 ft)	30	Doha	Residential	2006
Fatar office		104 metres (341 ft)	30	Doha	Office	1997
La Cigale Hotel		101 metres (331 ft)	28	Doha	Hotel	2007
The Ascott		101 metres (331 ft)	23	Doha	Hotel	2011
Al Hitmi Complex		101 metres (331 ft)	26	Doha	Office	2003
Supreme Education Council Tower		101 metres (331 ft)	23	Doha	Office	2002
Al Rabban Tower		100 metres (330 ft)	29	Doha	Residential	2009
Asas Twin Towers		100 metres (330 ft)	29	Doha	Office	2012
Qatar Charity Residential		98 metres (322 ft)	21	Lusail	Office	2022
Marina Tower 16		98 metres (322 ft)	24	Lusail	Residential	2022
Mövenpick Tower and Suites		97 metres (318 ft)	25	Lusail	Hotel	2007
Al Asiri Tower		97 metres (318 ft)	22	Doha	Office	2009
Burj Damac Waterfront		95 metres (312 ft)	20	Lusail	Residential	2021
Marina 09 Residences		95 metres (312 ft)	23	Lusail	Residential	2021
Plot 50 Tower		95 metres (312 ft)	22	Lusail	Office	2022
Al Jaber Twin Tower		92 metres (302 ft)	22	Lusail	Office	2022
Gulf Tower		92 metres (302 ft)	21	Doha	Office	2003
Ministry of Interior Tower		92 metres (302 ft)	21	Doha	Office	2001
Q Towers Lusail		91 metres (299 ft)	20	Lusail	Residential	2022
Al Shoumoukh Towers		90 metres (300 ft)	14	Doha	Office	2022
Somerset West Bay		90 metres (300 ft)	26	Doha	Residential	2008
Waterfront Hotel Apartments		90 metres (300 ft)	21	Lusail	Hotel	2021
FJ9 Residential Tower		90 metres (300 ft)	21	Lusail	Residential	2024

== Under construction ==
Building currently under construction
Building stopped construction

Building name	image	Height (metres/feet)	Stories	Status	Location (city)	Use	Year of completion
Doha Tower and Convention Center		551 metres (1,808 ft)	112	On hold	Doha	Multi-purpose	TBA
Qatar National Bank Tower		510 metres (1,670 ft)	101	On hold	Doha	Office	TBA
Al Quds Endowment Tower		495 metres (1,624 ft)	100	Cancelled	Doha	Multi-purpose	TBA
Dubai Towers Doha^{[A]}		437 metres (1,434 ft)	91	Under construction	Doha	Multi-purpose	2029
JW Marriott Tower Hotel		216 metres (709 ft)	52	Under construction	Doha	Hotel	2027
Mozoon Towers		208 metres (682 ft)	47	Under construction	Doha	Hotel	2027
A'Ayan Tower		191 metres (627 ft)	49	Under construction	Doha	Residential	2026
La Mer Tower		147 metres (482 ft)	39	Under construction	Lusail	Residential	2026
Al Ahli Bank Tower		111 metres (364 ft)	26	Under construction	Lusail	Office	2028

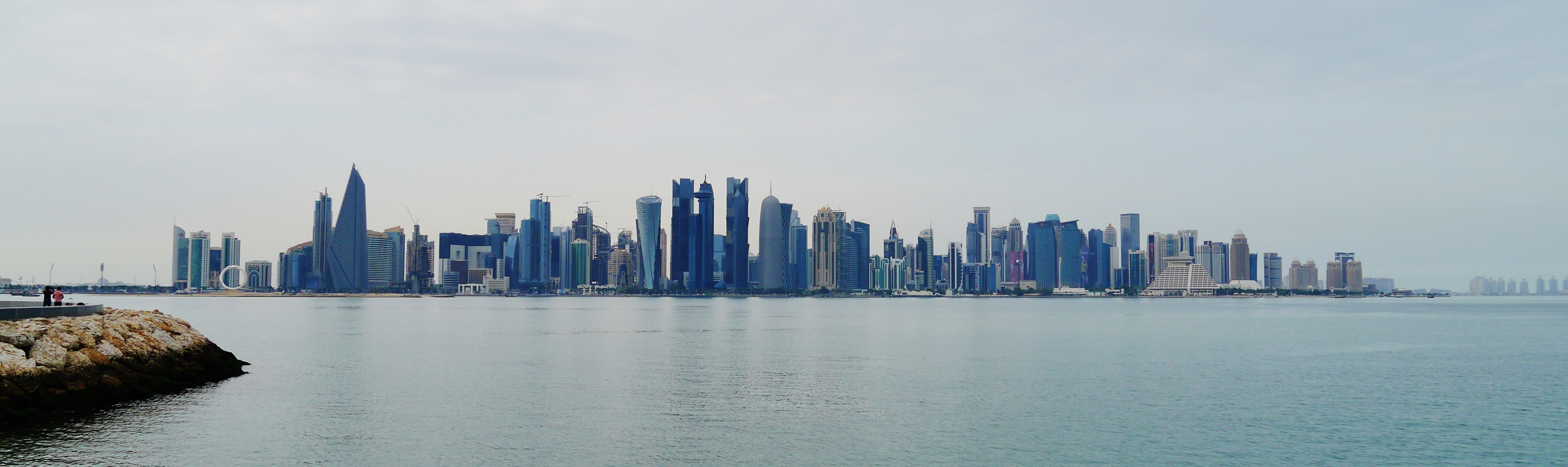
Skyline of Doha in 2023

== Proposed ==
Building name	Heights (metres/feet)	Stories	Location (city)	Use
Vertical City	750 metres (2,460 ft)	180	Doha	Multi-purpose
Oryx Tower		129	Doha	Multi-purpose
Barwa Tower	620 metres (2,030 ft)	119	Doha	Office
The Constellation Tower	500 metres (1,600 ft)	20	Doha	Office
QI Tower	466 metres (1,529 ft)	83	Doha	Office
Kamal Tower	408 metres (1,339 ft)	79	Doha	Multi-purpose
Luxury Height Tower	365 metres (1,198 ft)	85	Doha	Residential
The Climb Doha Tower	342 metres (1,122 ft)	83	Doha	Residential
Eqq Tower Doha	322 metres (1,056 ft)	73	Doha	Residential
Soccer Doha Tower	312 metres (1,024 ft)	80	Doha	Multi-purpose
Cytokinesis Tower	270 metres (890 ft)	70	Doha	Multi-purpose
Doha East & West Towers	200 metres (660 ft)	48	Doha	Multi-purpose
Desert Flower Tower	192 metres (630 ft)	38	Lusail	Multi-purpose
Al Zubara Tower	180 metres (590 ft)	43	Doha	Residential
Nozul Lusail Marina Tower	141 metres (463 ft)	25	Lusail	Multi-purpose
Lusail Office Tower	130 metres (430 ft)	31	Lusail	Multi-purpose
Wave Tower	110 metres (360 ft)	20	Lusail	Multi-purpose

== Notes ==
A. Construction is currently on hold due to lack of finances

== See also ==
- List of tallest buildings in Asia
- List of tallest buildings
