= Palm Towers Doha =

Skyscraper in Doha, Qatar

Palm Towers
- Interactive map of the Palm Towers area

General information
- Status: Completed
- Type: Office
- Location: Wes Bay, Doha, Qatar, Al Funduq St, Doha
- Coordinates: 25.31825°N 51.52666°E
- Construction started: 2006
- Completed: 2011

Height
- Roof: 245 m (804 ft)

Technical details
- Structural system: Reinforced concrete
- Floor count: 58 (both)
- Floor area: 82,473 m^{2} (888,000 sq ft)

Design and construction
- Architect: MZ Architects
- Structural engineer: Hill International; Doka GmbH

The Palm Towers are an office skyscraper complex in West Bay, Doha, Qatar. The two buildings are equally divided into 58 floors, standing at 245 m (804 ft) tall each, both being inaugurated in 2011. They share the fifth spot in the top of the tallest buildings in Qatar.

== History ==
=== Architecture ===
Designed to resemble a palm tree, the two hexagonal towers were inspired by the symbol of survival in the scorching deserts of Arab countries. They are intended to make a statement in the city skyline as part of Doha's tallest buildings. A basic image, deeply embedded in the public's memory, is transformed into one of the most prominent architectural features in Doha's skyline. Every building has 58 levels made of glass, separated into 3 sections by stainless steel panels that resemble the tree trunk. The tower resembles a modern obelisk with its symbolic form and sharp angles. The towers, with a total built-up area of 82,473 m^{2} (888,000 sq ft), include special duplex offices to meet the specific needs of certain clients in addition to the regular offices. The efficiency of the layout is enhanced by the circular core and hexagonal shape. The towers are linked at the bottom by a parking structure that is eight stories tall.

The two buildings glazings build feature a composition of 10-millimeter acid-etched face clear tempered glass with white back painting then back grey layer 2-millimeter chamfered edges from all sides.

The two buildings received the LEED Gold Certificate in 2012.

== See also ==
- List of tallest buildings in Doha, Qatar
