= Al Fardan Towers =

Residential skyscraper in Doha, Qatar

General information
- Status: Completed
- Type: Mixed-use, Residential, Office
- Location: Wes Bay, Doha, Qatar, 61 Al Funduq, Doha
- Coordinates: 25.32150°N 51.52914°E
- Construction started: 2005
- Completed: 2007

Height
- Roof: 178 m (584 ft) (Tower 1); 140 m (460 ft) (Tower 2)

Technical details
- Structural system: Reinforced concrete
- Floor count: 40 (Tower 1); 32 (Tower 2)
- Floor area: 130,069 m^{2} (1,400,000 sq ft)

Design and construction
- Structural engineer: Dar al-Handasah Shair & Partners; Doka GmbH

Al Fardan Towers is a mixed-use building complex in West Bay, Doha, Qatar built between 2005 and 2007 and consisting of two towers standing at 178 m (584 ft) tall with 40 floors (Tower 1) and 140 m (460 ft) tall with 32 floors (Tower 2).

== History ==
=== Architecture ===
The two towers are situated in West Bay's business district and surround themselves with various shops, cafés and restaurants. Their ground plan shape imitates a human eye and the facades of both towers are half glazed half patterned with windows and wallcovering. The ground level features a podium which hosts a car showroom, a retail shop and other commercial spaces.

The towers, despite being a twin pair of buildings, exercise different functions. The north tower is an office building with 30 typical office floors, a plant room and technical spaces and the south tower is a residential building with 40 typical apartment floors with a total of 174 units, a swimming pool and a healthcare club, and also features plant and technical spaces.

== See also ==
- List of tallest buildings in Doha, Qatar
