= France–Qatar relations =

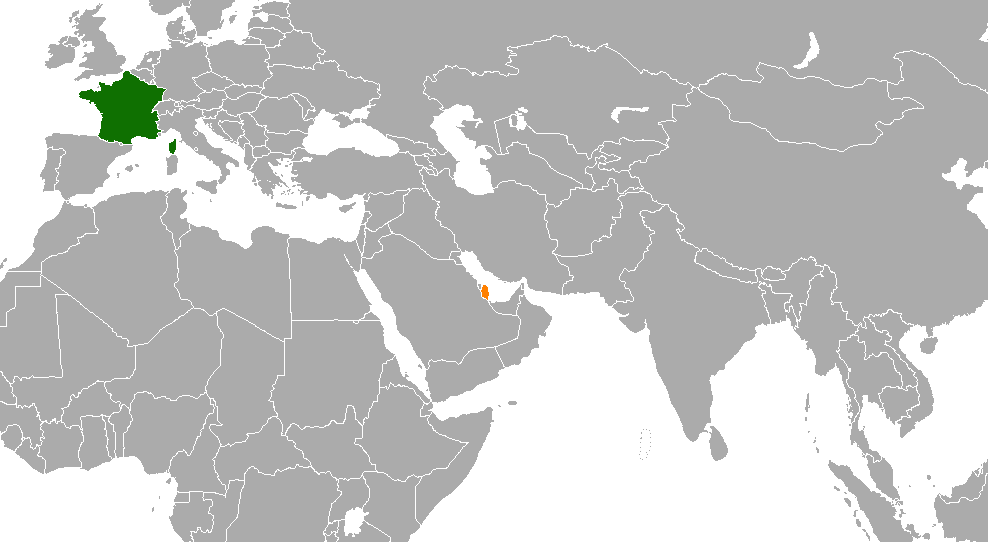

- France: Qatar

France–Qatar relations are the bilateral relations between France and the Qatar. The first embassy to be established was the Qatari embassy in France in 1972, and the first bilateral agreement was signed in 1974. Qatar has marked various concurrences with France, covering all areas such as cultural, political, economical, academic, scientific and military agreements. The nations are tied in a key discourse protocol, where conversation over various issues of significance to the two capitals are occurring consistently.

== History ==
France–Qatar relations unofficially date back to Qatar's independence on 21 September 1971, when Qatar's representative to the UN, Hassan Kamel, delivered his country's admittance speech to the UN in French. Qatar established its first embassy in France in 1972, and made its first presidential visit to France in 1974.

== Diplomatic representation ==
Qatar has had an embassy in France since 1972, situated in Rue de Tilsitt, Paris. The current Qatari ambassador to France is Ali bin Jassim Al-Thani who succeeded Khalid bin Rashid Al-Mansouri who held post from 2017 to 2019. France's embassy is based in the West Bay district of Doha, and is headed by the French ambassador to Qatar, Jean-Baptiste Faivre. He is the successor of Franck Gellet.

== Diplomatic visits ==
Emir Hamad bin Khalifa Al Thani was the first Arab leader to visit France after Nicolas Sarkozy assumed presidency in 2007.

On 22 June 2013, French president François Hollande visited Doha to discuss the economic ties between France and Qatar. He also met with Emir Hamad bin Khalifa Al Thani in order to discuss the Syrian Civil War.

On 3 May 2015, President Hollande visited Qatar where he signed cooperation agreements in the field of civil defence.

Qatar's ruler, Sheikh Tamim bin Hamad Al Thani, visited French president Emmanuel Macron in September 2017 to discuss the Qatari diplomatic crisis. Macron stated that the countries should lift sanctions against Qatari nationals. He also reiterated France's support for Kuwaiti mediation efforts and opined that the crisis is harmful to the stability of the region.

On 7 December 2017, Sheikh Tamim welcomed Macron to his first official visit to Doha. They discussed bilateral relations, the Gulf crisis and the situation in the Middle East. During the visit, both countries signed commercial contracts worth more than US$14 billion.

On 6 July 2018, His Highness, Sheikh Tamim bin Hamad Al-Thani travelled to Paris, France for an official state visit where he was received by French president Emmanuel Macron at the Élysée Palace. A few arrangements were endorsed amongst France and Qatar in the fields of food safety, driving licence recognition, and cybersecurity.

On 3 December 2021, Sheikh Tamim received president Macron for a working visit in Doha to discuss the regional situations in the Gulf states and Afghanistan. Macron thanked Qatar for its diplomacy during the Afghan crisis and the evacuations of hundreds of French nationals and Afghans after the fall of Kabul.

== Diplomatic cooperation ==
=== International organizations ===
Despite Qatar's population comprising only 1% French speakers, the country was admitted in the Organisation internationale de la Francophonie as an associate member in 2012. It was not required to join as an observer state prior to its full admittance.

=== Political ===
In effort to mend ties between Qatar and the countries which severed relations with it during the Qatar diplomatic crisis, France assigned a special envoy to mediate between the two parties in September 2017.

After controversial comments made by the French President Emmanuel Macron over cartoons depicting Muhammad, there was a push to boycott French products in Qatar and other Arab countries. In October 2020, an article published by The peninsula Qatar, one of the news websites that has Qatar’s daily updates, told that ban came off and companies in Qatar announced withdrawing the removal of French products from its shelves/inventory. Another report from France Diplomacy claimed that both nations share maintained relations since Qatar’s declaration of independence in 1971 and the mutual opening of diplomatic relations the following year. Consultations between the authorities, including at the highest level, are regular. The Strategic Dialogue, established in 2019, enables operational follow-up of the major projects which structure the bilateral relationship. The first round, co-chaired by the Foreign Ministers, took place in Doha on 28 March 2022. Since 2017, the President of the French Republic has travelled twice to Doha. During his first visit on 7 December 2017, several agreements were signed in the areas of the economy, education, defence and the fight against terrorism and radicalization.

On January 16, 2024, Qatar and France brokered a deal between Israel and Hamas. The purpose of the deal was to deliver urgent medication to approximately 45 Israeli hostages held by Hamas in Gaza. As a result, the most vulnerable civilians would receive humanitarian and medical aid.

The third annual France-Qatar Strategic Dialogue took place in Paris on June 12, 2025, co-chaired by French Minister for Europe and Foreign Affairs, Jean-Noël Barrot, and Qatari Prime Minister and Minister of Foreign Affairs, HE Sheikh Mohammed bin Abdulrahman bin Jassim Al Thani, the Dialogue reaffirmed the strong bilateral relationship between the two countries and committed to expanding their strategic partnership across key areas. Moreover, both ministers reiterated their shared commitment to a rules-based international order, international law, peace and stability in the Middle East, and close cooperation on regional and global crises.

=== Military ===
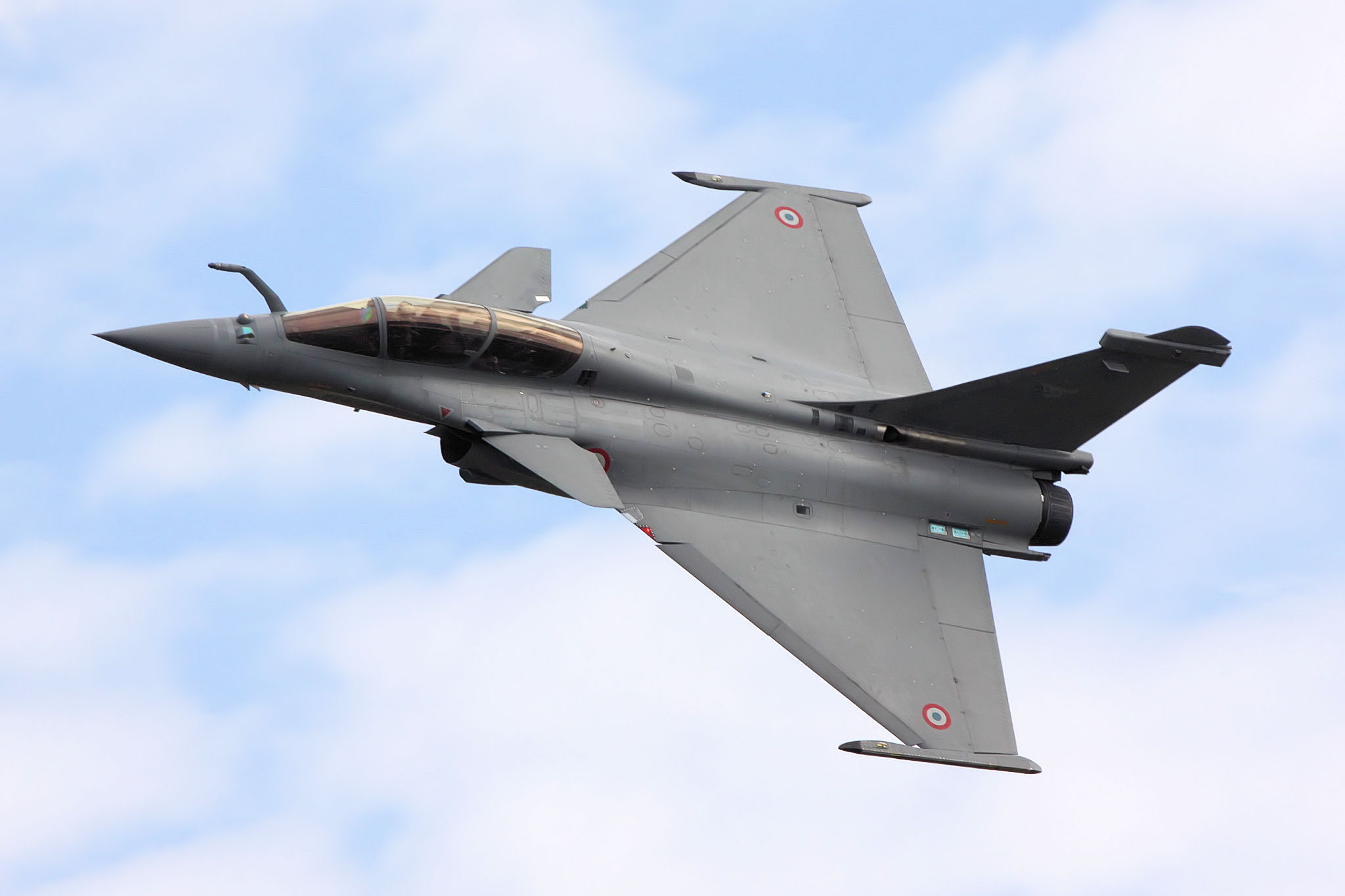
Dassault Rafale fighter jet

France and Qatar signed a defence pact in 1994.

In 2009, approximately 80% of Qatar's military equipment derived from France. France provides military training to Qatar's special forces.

In May 2015, French president François Hollande and Qatari emir Tamim bin Hamad Al Thani signed an agreement for Qatar to purchase 24 Dassault Rafale fighter jets to be used for reconnaissance missions.

In March 2018, Qatar purchased 12 more Dassault Rafale fighter jets as part of an existing contractual option with Dassault Aviation. France delivered the first five Rafale jets to Qatar on 5 June 2019 – the day that marked Qatar's two years since the economic and diplomatic blockade. In June 2019, as Qatar completed two years under the diplomatic embargo, the country received its first five of the 36 purchased Rafale fighter jets from France. The first aircraft was formally handed to Qatar in February 2019, but was kept in France itself before being delivered on 5 June 2019.

=== Business and investment ===
France passed a law in 2008 which accorded Qatari investors in Paris with certain tax exemptions.

Qatar became France's seventh largest customer and sixth largest supplier in the Middle East in 2012. Exports from France focus mainly on the supply of capital goods, deliveries of Airbus aircraft, and trade.

Qatar Investment Authority owned a 2% stake in French media company Vivendi in early 2012. It also owns a stake in Lagardère Group and construction company Vinci SA.

In 2012, Qatar entered in a preliminary agreement with France to invest 50 million euros in small-scale businesses in France's suburbs. However, the agreement drew criticism by France's political parties, and as a result, it was renegotiated later that year under the terms that it would not fund businesses based on their geographic location. In June 2013, a new agreement was announced which saw the French financial organisation Caisse des dépôts et consignations become involved and the total value of investment raised to 300 million euros.

In December 2017, both countries signed commercial contracts worth more than US$14 billion.

On 11 February 2019, the two countries concluded a "strategic dialogue" to strengthen cooperation on matters relating to the economy, energy and security.

In January 2020, Qatar signed a $470-million deal with France to build its first solar energy plant that could meet up to one-tenth of peak national power demand. Total S.A. holds a 49% of the foreign investors’ stake in the project.

=== Security ===
France, known for its expertise in internal security, plays a crucial role in the success of Milipol Qatar (from October 29 to 31, 2024), the leading international exhibition in the field of internal security of States. The France Pavilion, a joint initiative by CCI Seine-et-Marne and Business France, highlights the country's commitment to empowering its companies to contribute to Qatar's dynamic security market. French companies showcase their cutting-edge capabilities in fields such as cybersecurity, drone surveillance, and protecting critical infrastructure. The collaboration on internal security between both countries are the key aspect of their bilateral relations, reflecting a longstanding and mutually beneficial partnership. This collaboration was formalized in 2003 through close cooperation between the Qatari Internal Security Force and the French national gendarmerie. The partnership has since expanded to cover various areas, including counterterrorism, crisis response, and specialized training.

=== Education ===
French international school Lycée Bonaparte was opened in Doha in the mid-1970s. Lycée Voltaire, also a French school, was opened in Qatar under the supervision of Nicolas Sarkozy in 2008. Several issues ensued between the school board and the Ministry of Education. However, for instance, the Ministry of Education attempted to manipulate the school's curriculum by removing a chapter pertaining to Christianity in the Middle Ages from one of the school's text books.

HEC Paris, a business school, became the first non-English, European institution to establish a branch in Education City in June 2010. It also launched Qatar's first executive MBA in February 2011.

=== Sport ===
Qatar Sports Investment, a subsidiary of Qatar Investment Authority, purchased French football club Paris St-Germain in October 2012. The club value was estimated to be worth $130 million, and the QSI invested a further $340 million in the club's players. Qatar-based beIN Sports acquired co-broadcasting rights of Ligue 1 (France's top football league) in 2014.

During the 2024 Summer Olympics in Paris, Qatar provides security assistance to France including security personnel, foot patrols, cyber security analysis and drone surveillance.

=== Arts and culture ===
Abdullah bin Khalifa Al Thani, a member of Qatar's royal family, purchased the 17th-century hôtel particulier (grand townhouse) Hôtel Lambert in 2007 for a reported $88 million. He came under fire after the attempted to renovate the building in 2009, with critics stating that any reconstruction would harm France's architectural heritage.

== Resident diplomatic missions ==
- France has an embassy in Doha.
- Qatar has an embassy in Paris.
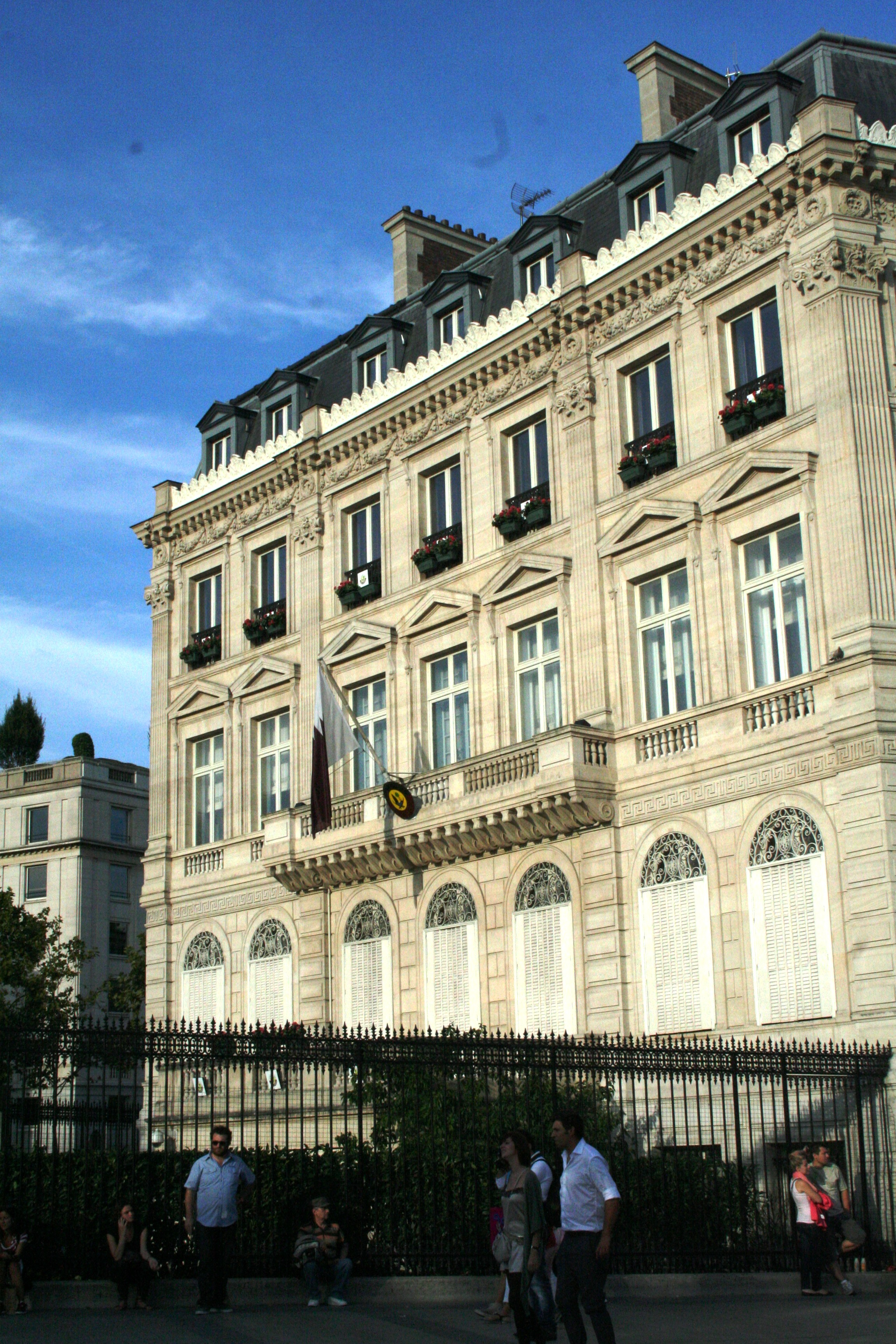
Embassy of Qatar in Paris

== See also ==
- Foreign relations of France
- Foreign relations of Qatar
