= Navigation Tower Doha =

Residential skyscraper in Doha, Qatar

Navigation Tower
- برج الملاحة (Arabic)
- Interactive map of the Navigation Tower area

General information
- Status: Completed
- Type: Office
- Location: Wes Bay, Doha, Qatar, 8GCG+JW2, Maysaloun Street, Doha
- Coordinates: 25.32171°N 51.52730°E
- Construction started: 2006
- Completed: 2011

Height
- Roof: 209 m (686 ft)

Technical details
- Structural system: Reinforced concrete
- Floor count: 53
- Floor area: 116,671 m^{2} (1,255,840 sq ft)
- Lifts/elevators: 8

Design and construction
- Architect: MZ Architects
- Architecture firm: MZ Architects
- Structural engineer: KONE; Doka GmbH

The Navigation Tower is an office skyscraper in West Bay, Doha, Qatar. Built between 2006 and 2011, the tower stands at 209 m (686 ft) tall with 53 floors and is the 22nd tallest building in Qatar.

== History ==
=== Architecture ===
The primary purpose of the project was developing a versatile, detailed yet functional strategy for an office building that can adapt to a challenging climate while also displaying a distinctive design that represents the client's image, authority, and dominance in the industry.

The project aimed to design a building with two main facades instead of four, integrating with the site's orientation to optimize daylight intake and minimize direct sunlight exposure to prevent overheating. There were no limitations on the architectural design, but the client wanted a striking skyscraper tailored for high-level executives in need of luxury and convenience, featuring around 50,000 m^{2} (540,000 sq ft) of versatile, detailed yet functional office areas, with the top 5,000 m^{2} (54,000 sq ft) designated for the company's main offices.

The slim volumetry of the building, with cut edges shapes out a sharp outline and stands impressively, evoking the grandeur of monolithic sculptures. Designed to match the shifting sun angles, the horizontal shades on the southern and northern sides serve as connectors between the expansive eastern and western sides, symbolizing the company's global maritime presence.

== See also ==
Navigation Tower (at center left)

- List of tallest buildings in Doha, Qatar
