= Al Mana Tower =

Residential skyscraper in Doha, Qatar

- برج المانع (Arabic)
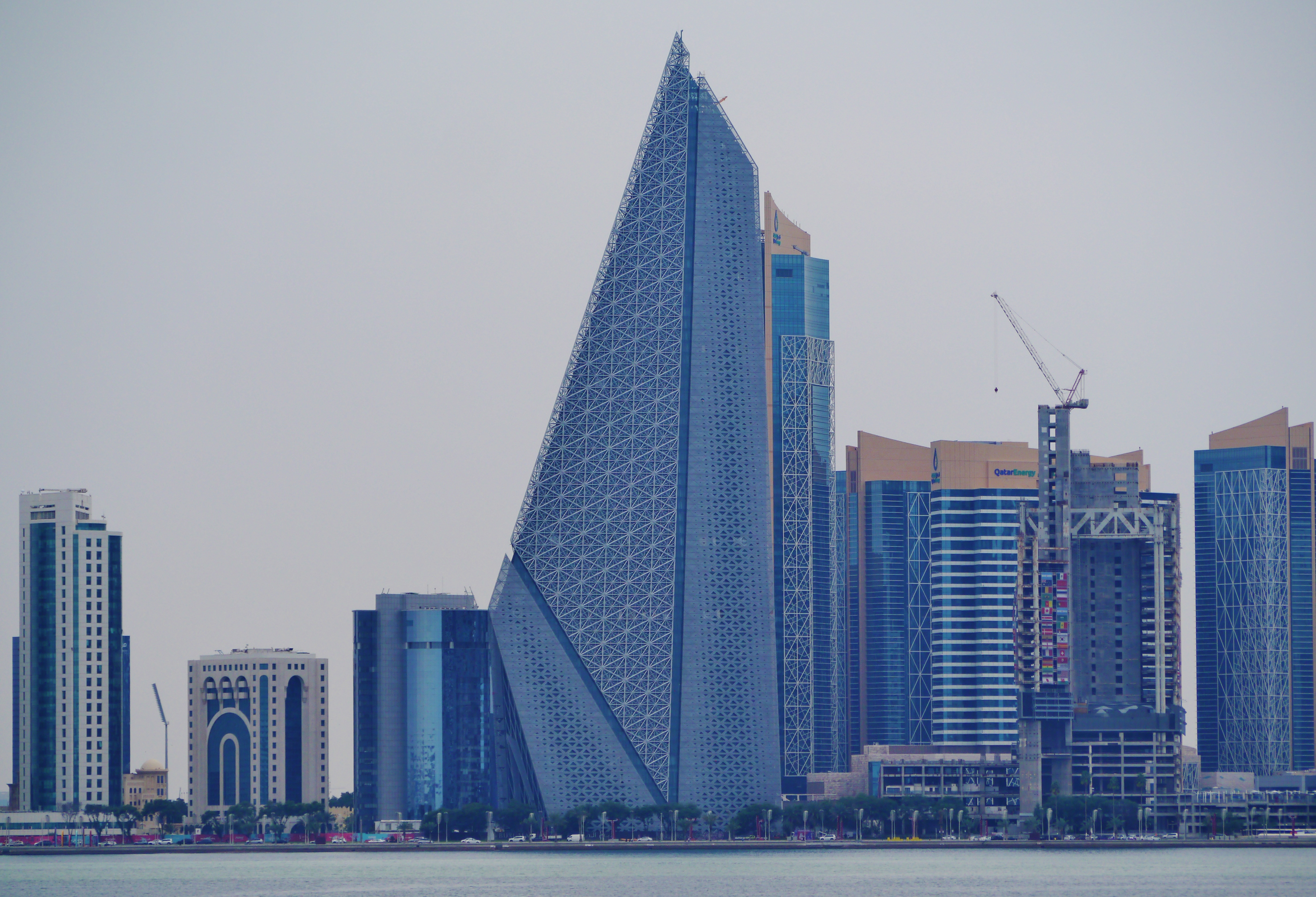

General information
- Status: Completed
- Type: Mixed-use, Residential, Office
- Location: West Bay, Doha, Qatar, Doha Corniche, Doha
- Coordinates: 25.31389°N 51.52124°E
- Construction started: 2014
- Completed: 2023
- Owner: Al Mana International Holdings

Height
- Roof: 247 m (810 ft)

Technical details
- Structural system: Reinforced concrete
- Floor count: 57 (+6 underground)

Design and construction
- Architects: MZ & Partners
- Structural engineer: KONE; Doka GmbH

Website
- Burj Al Mana

The Al Mana Tower also known as Burj Al Mana is a mixed-use skyscraper in West Bay, Doha, Qatar, standing at 247 m (810 ft) tall with 57 floors. Built between 2014 and 2023, it is the current fifth tallest building in Qatar.

== History ==
=== Architecture ===
The concept of the tower was inspired by traditional Middle Eastern architecture, though aiming for the creation of a futuristic landmark. The facades present three-dimensional pattern models replicating the Arabic Mashrabiya. The tower hosts the residential section between levels one and 37, and the office section between levels 37 and 48. It has a total of 168 one, two and three-bedroomed apartment units and 117 office suits divided and furnished as simplexes and duplexes. The building also benefits from a swimming pool, gyms, private elevators and retail spaces for supermarkets and pharmacies.

Head of the Commercial and Towers of Al Mana Capital Real Estate Wassim Soubra stated that due to its strategic positioning on the Corniche, Burj AlMana offers views and convenient access to key locations, guaranteeing easy connections to important hubs and through its distinctive architectural style, the landmark attracts companies wanting to showcase their status and goals in the market.

In December 2024, IBM opened a new office in Al Mana Tower. The opening was held alongside the Qatar Global AI Summit, and Qatar's communications and information technology minister, Mohammed bin Ali Al Mannai, Wissam Shmait, General Manager of IBM in Qatar and US ambassador Timmy Davis attended.

== See also ==
- List of tallest buildings in Doha, Qatar
