= Lycée Voltaire =

Lycée Voltaire may refer to the following schools:

In France:

- Lycée Voltaire (Paris) in Paris
- Lycée Voltaire (Orléans) in Orléans

Outside France:

- Lycée Franco-Qatarien Voltaire in Qatar
