= Porsche Design Tower (Stuttgart) =

Skyscraper in Stuttgart, Germany

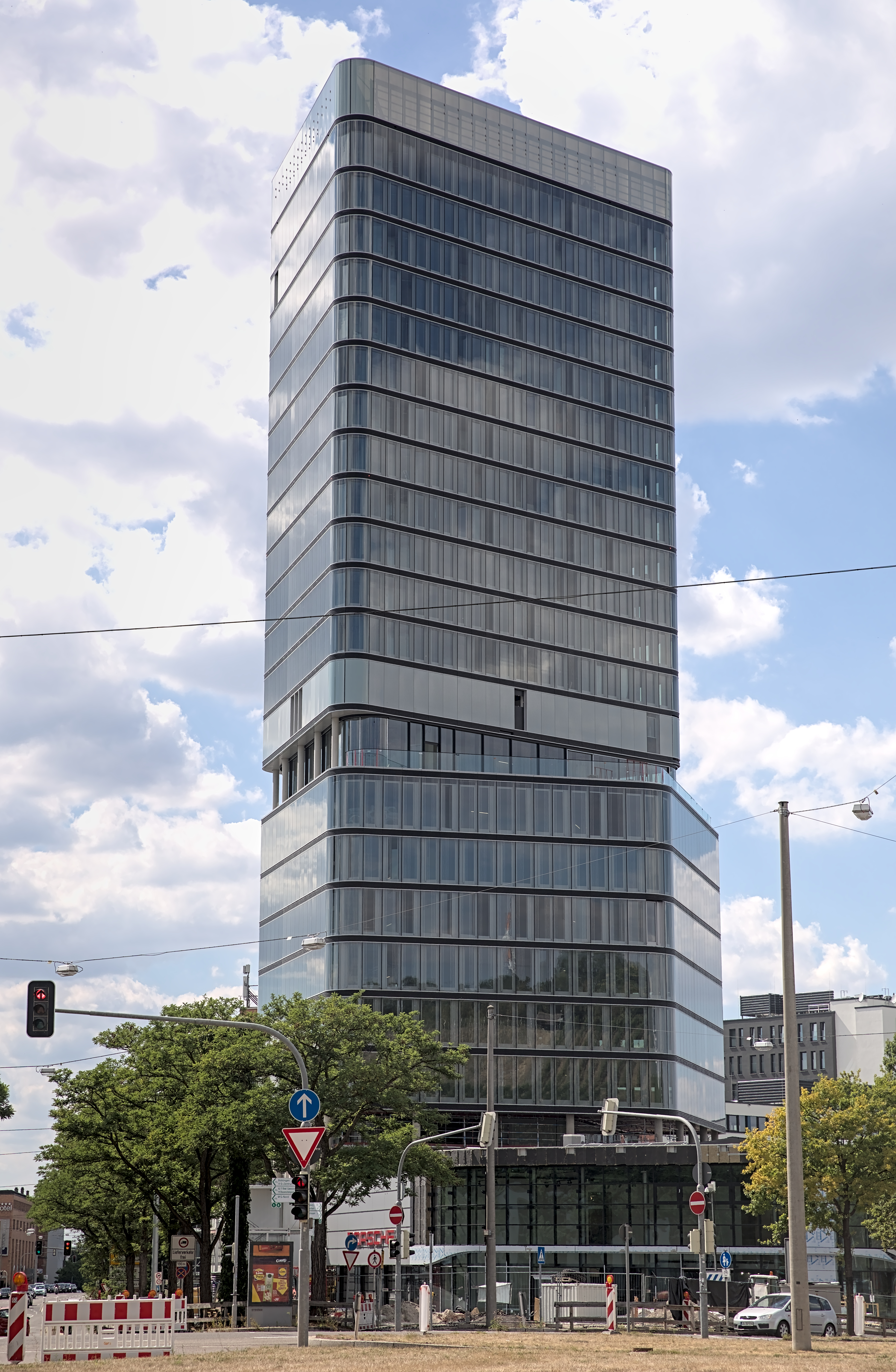
- Interactive map of the Porsche Design Tower area

General information
- Status: Completed
- Type: Mixed-use: Office / Hotel
- Location: Stuttgart, Germany, 6 Siemensstraße, Stuttgart, Germany
- Coordinates: 48°48′40″N 9°10′49″E
- Construction started: 2020
- Completed: 2023
- Owner: Porsche Design (branded)

Height
- Roof: 90 m (300 ft)

Technical details
- Structural system: Concrete
- Floor count: 25
- Floor area: 20,000 m^{2} (215,000 sq ft)

Design and construction
- Architect: Bülow Aktiengesellschaft
- Developer: Radisson Hotel Group
- Structural engineer: Doka GmbH (formwork)

Website
- Porsche Design Tower Stuttgart

The Porsche Design Tower is a mixed-use high-rise building in the Pragsattel district of Stuttgart, Germany. Built between 2020 and 2023, the tower stands at 90 m (300 ft) tall with 25 floors and is the current tallest habitable building in Stuttgart.

== History ==
=== Architecture ===
The Porsche Design Tower is 87 meters high and has 25 floors above ground, making it the tallest skyscraper in Stuttgart. It opened in mid-2023 and is branded by Porsche Design. The Porsche Design Tower has 134 underground parking spaces and a floor area of around 20,000 m^{2} (215,000 sq ft).

Along with a building in Sunny Isles Beach, it is the second building to bear the name Porsche Design Tower. A third construction project in Frankfurt was canceled in the planning phase.

Construction was originally scheduled to begin in July 2019 and be completed by the end of 2022, but the approval process was suspended in November 2019.

The construction site was set up in March 2020. Before that, the site had to be cleared of contaminated soil. In August 2020, a 119 m high construction crane was erected. The shell was completed in February 2022, the opening was in mid-2023.

In addition to a publicly accessible restaurant on the 10th floor, there is office space up to the 8th floor, the main tenant is Porsche Consulting GmbH. In addition to two technical floors, the upper floors of the tower house a hotel with 168 rooms and conference rooms, which the Radisson Hotel Group has operated under the Radisson Blu brand since November 2023. Porsche 's Stuttgart branch also moved to the property from Stuttgart-Zuffenhausen in September 2022.

== Gallery ==
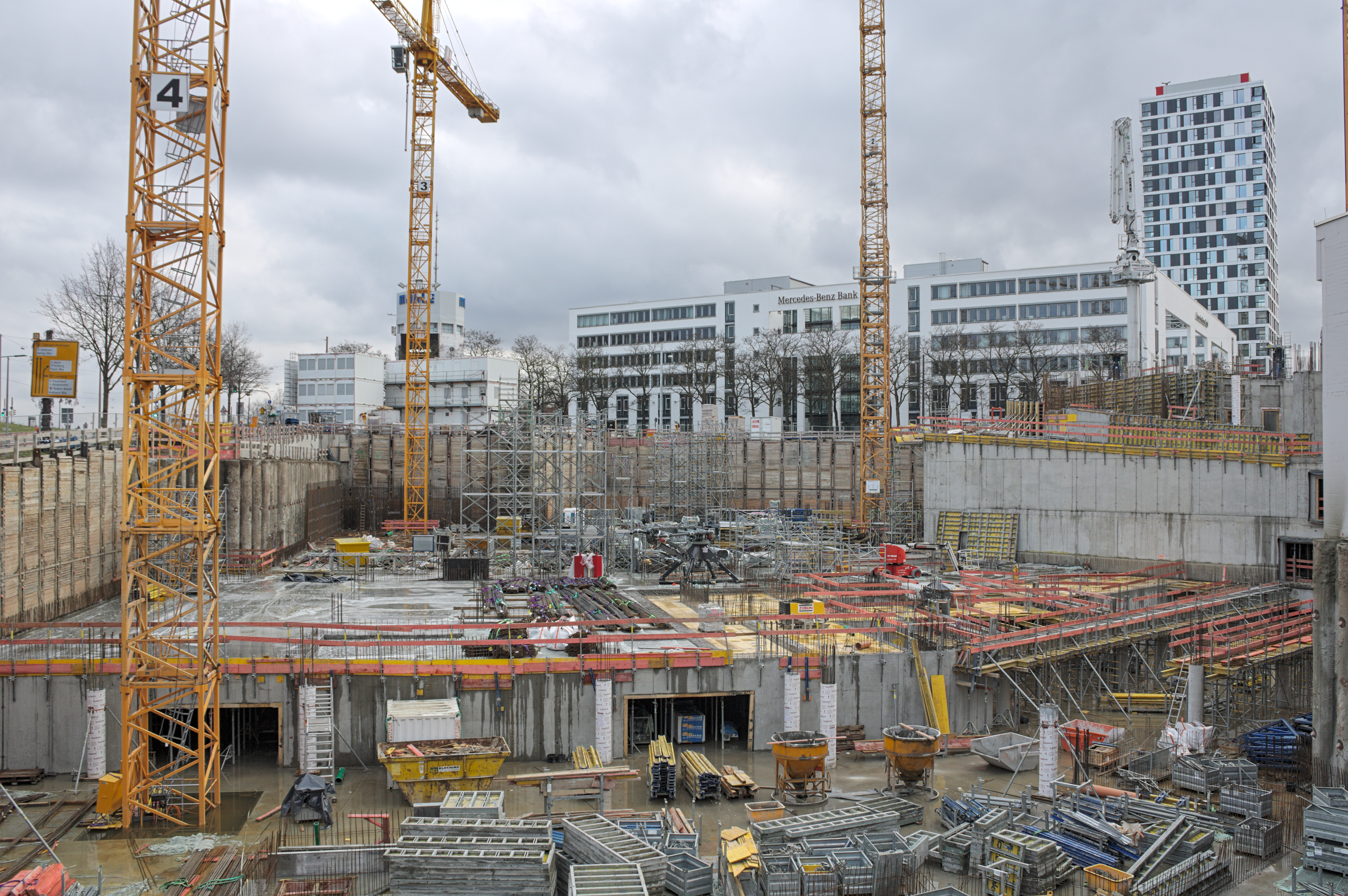
Construction progress in January 2021

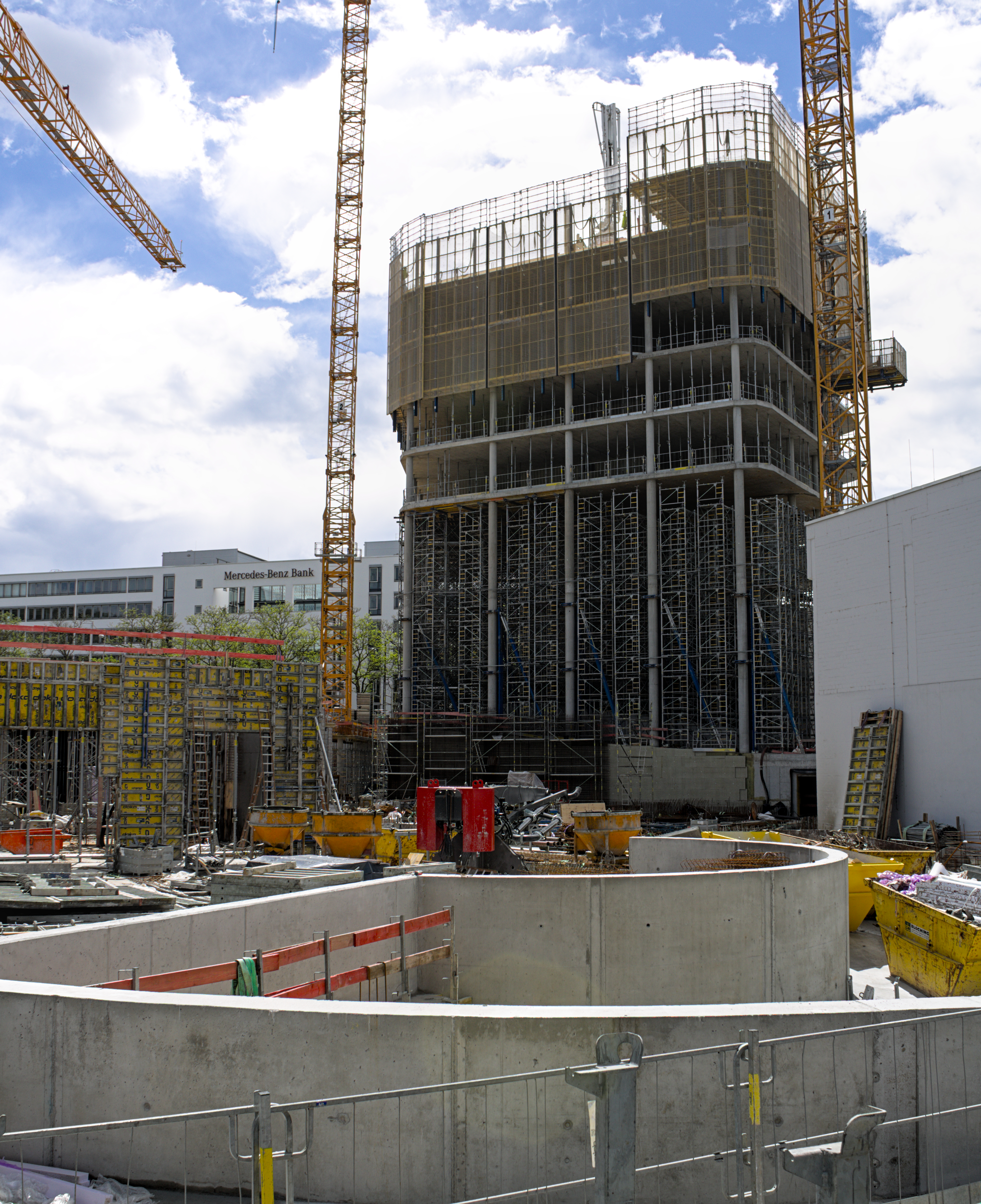
In May 2021

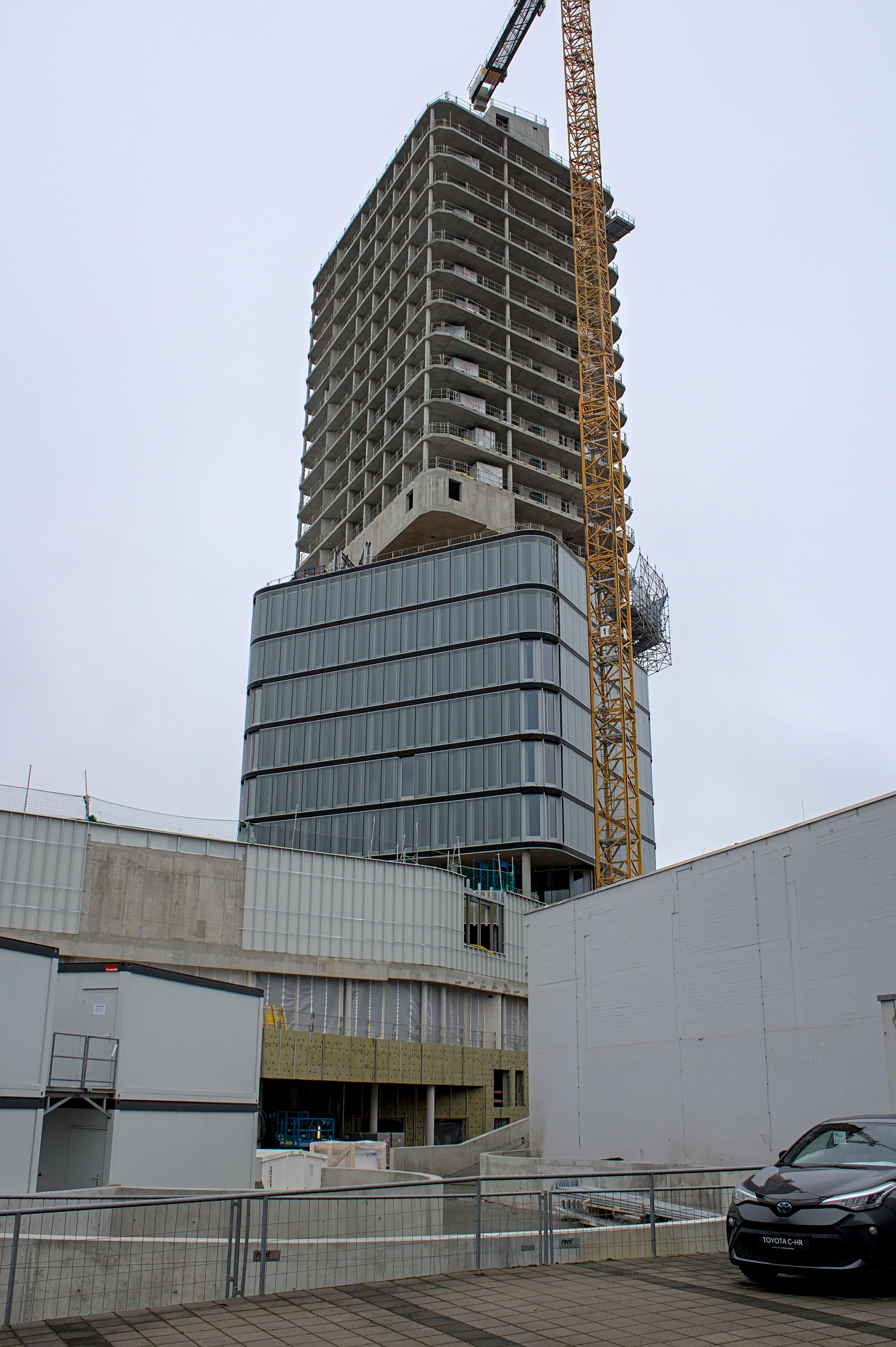
In December 2021

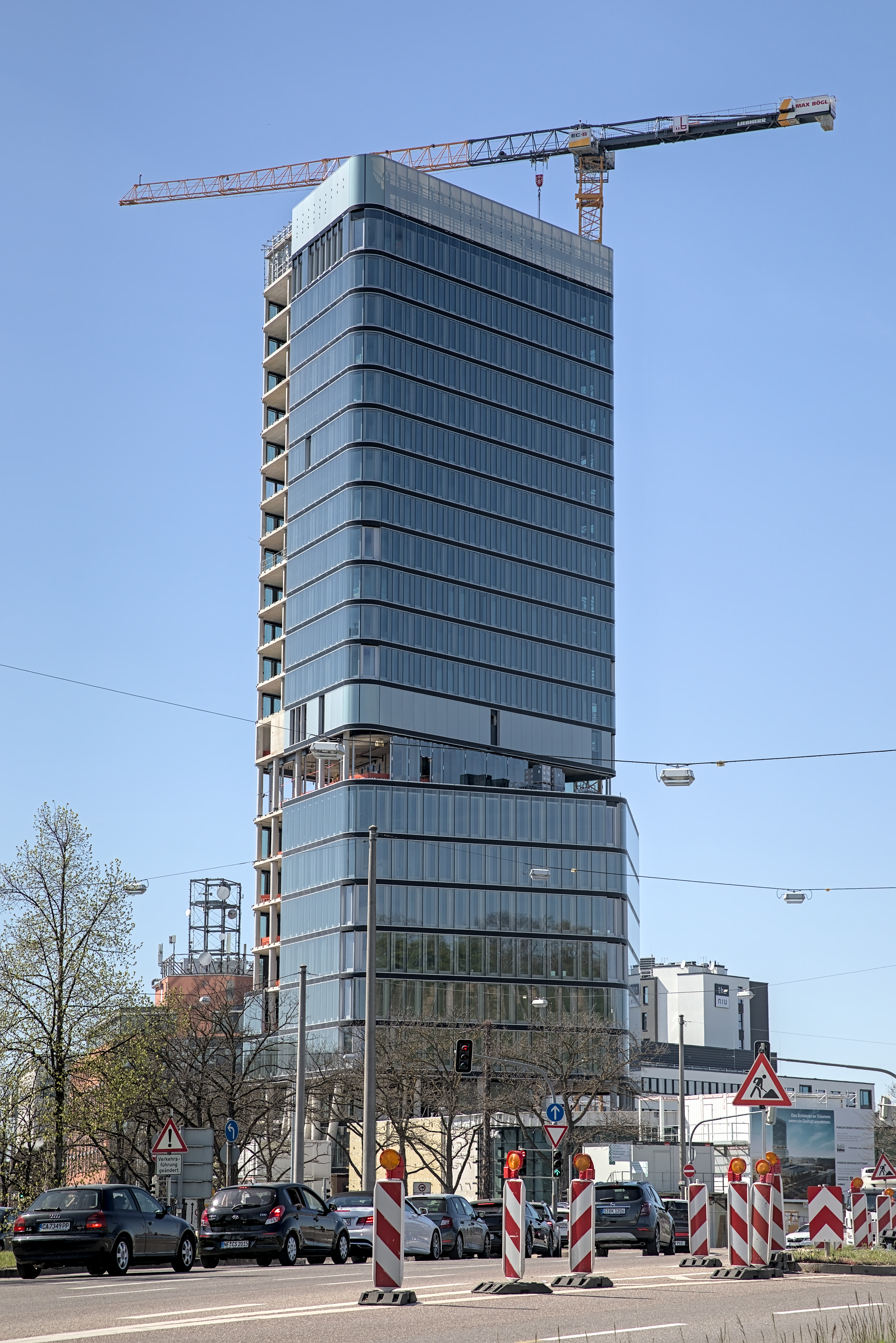
In April 2022

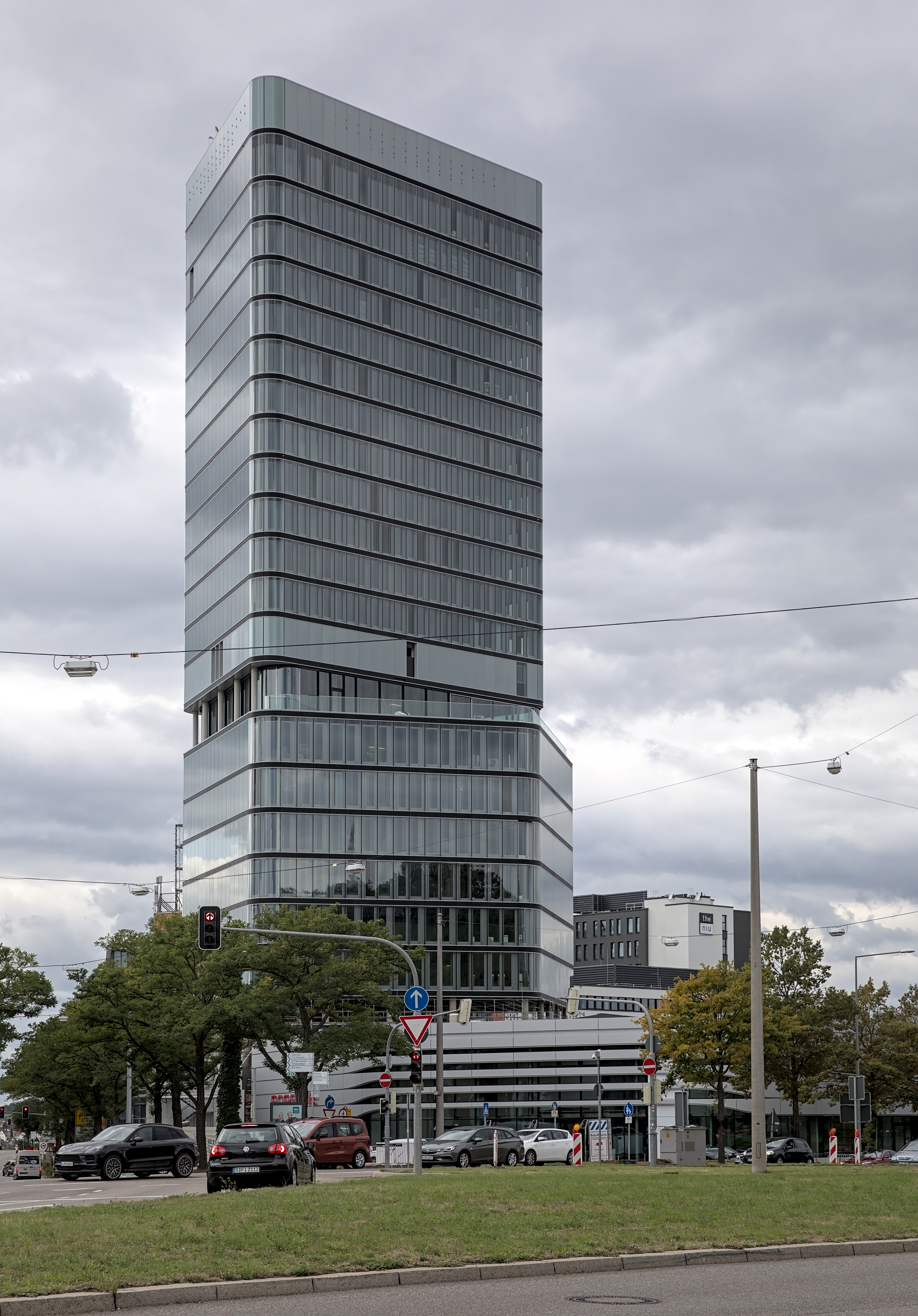
and in September 2022

== See also ==
- List of tallest buildings in Stuttgart
- List of tallest buildings in Germany
