= Al Fardan Residences =

Residential skyscraper in Doha, Qatar

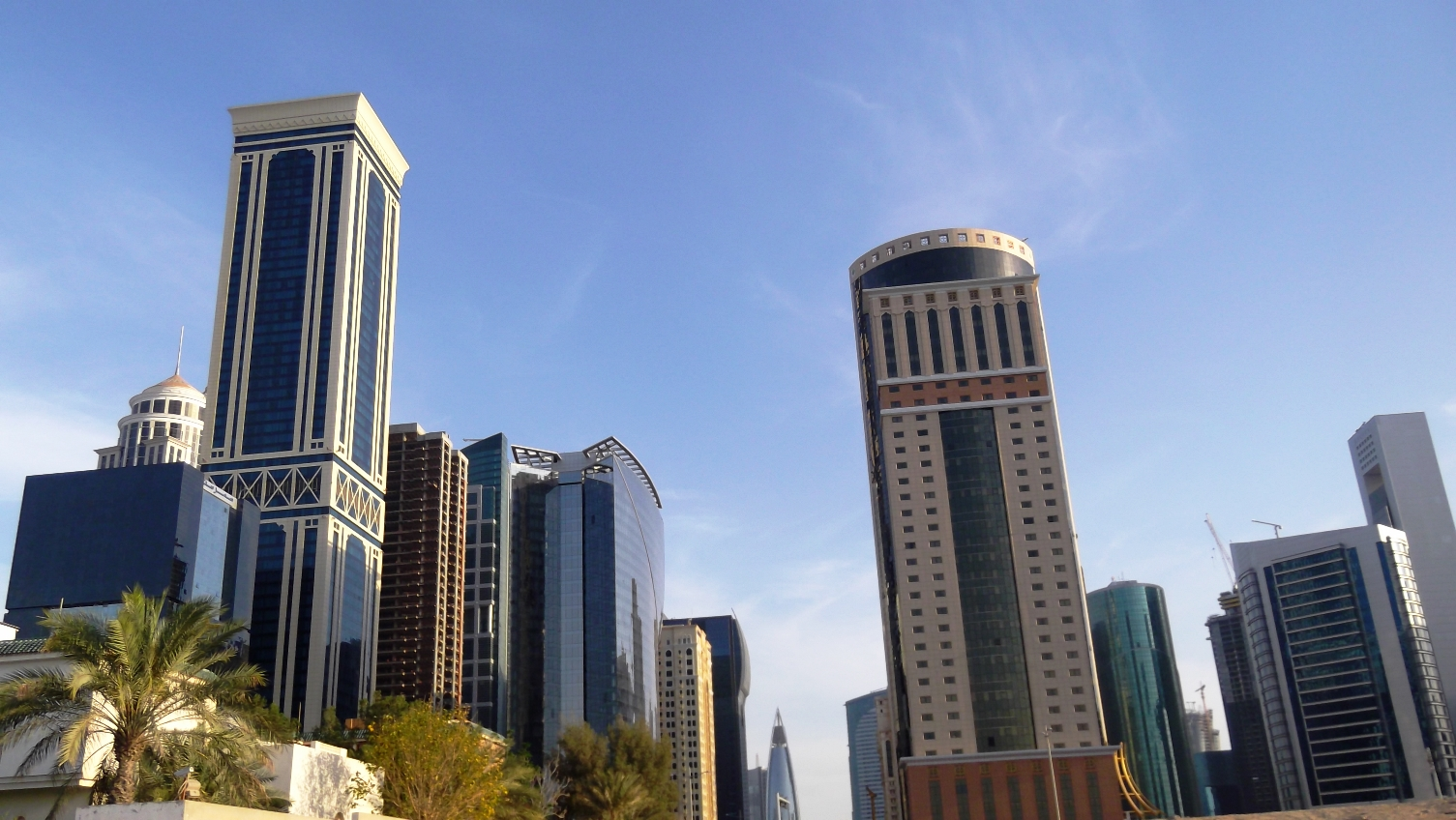
- The Barjeel Tower (left)
- Interactive map of the Al Fardan Residences area

General information
- Status: Consummate
- Type: Residential
- Location: Wes Bay, Doha, Qatar, Al Qassar Street, Doha
- Coordinates: 25.32870°N 51.53118°E
- Completed: 2009

Height
- Roof: 245 m (804 ft)

Technical details
- Structural system: Concrete
- Floor count: 64

Design and construction
- Structural engineer: Doka GmbH

Website
- www.kempinski.com/en/residences-doha

Al Fardan Residences, also known as the Barjeel Tower and the Wind Tower (or as Kempinski Residences and Suites), is a 64-storey residential skyscraper in West Bay, Doha, Qatar. At 254 metres (830 feet), it is the second tallest completed building in Doha. Each of the storeys is 4.1 metres (13.5 feet), each built with 94 "SKE 50 automatic climbers", in a 3 to 4-day cycle. Construction began in 2006 and was completed in 2009.

== See also ==
- List of tallest buildings in Doha, Qatar
