= List of tallest buildings in Stuttgart =

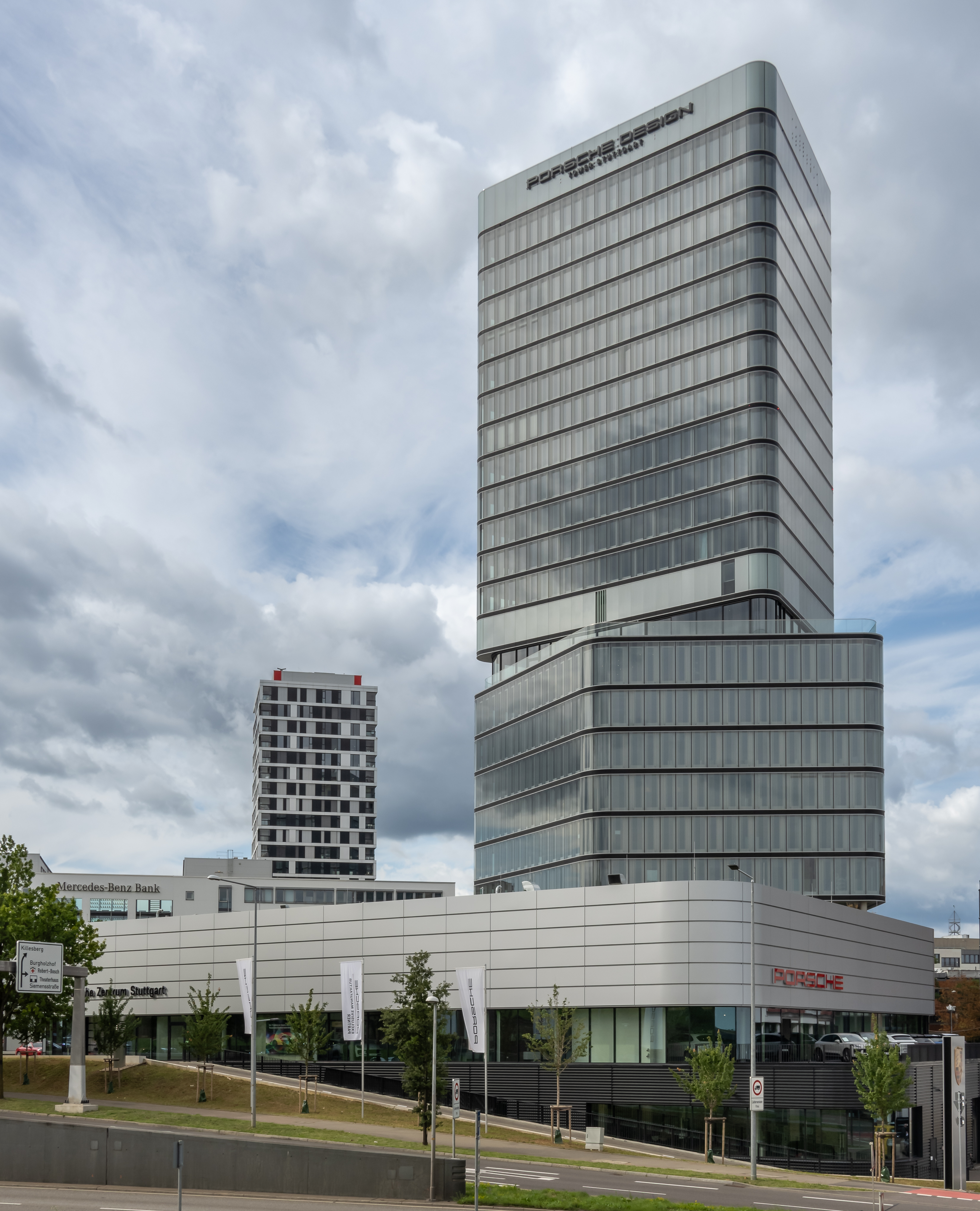
Porsche Design Tower (in the foreground) and Skyline Living (in the background). The two tallest high-rise buildings in Stuttgart

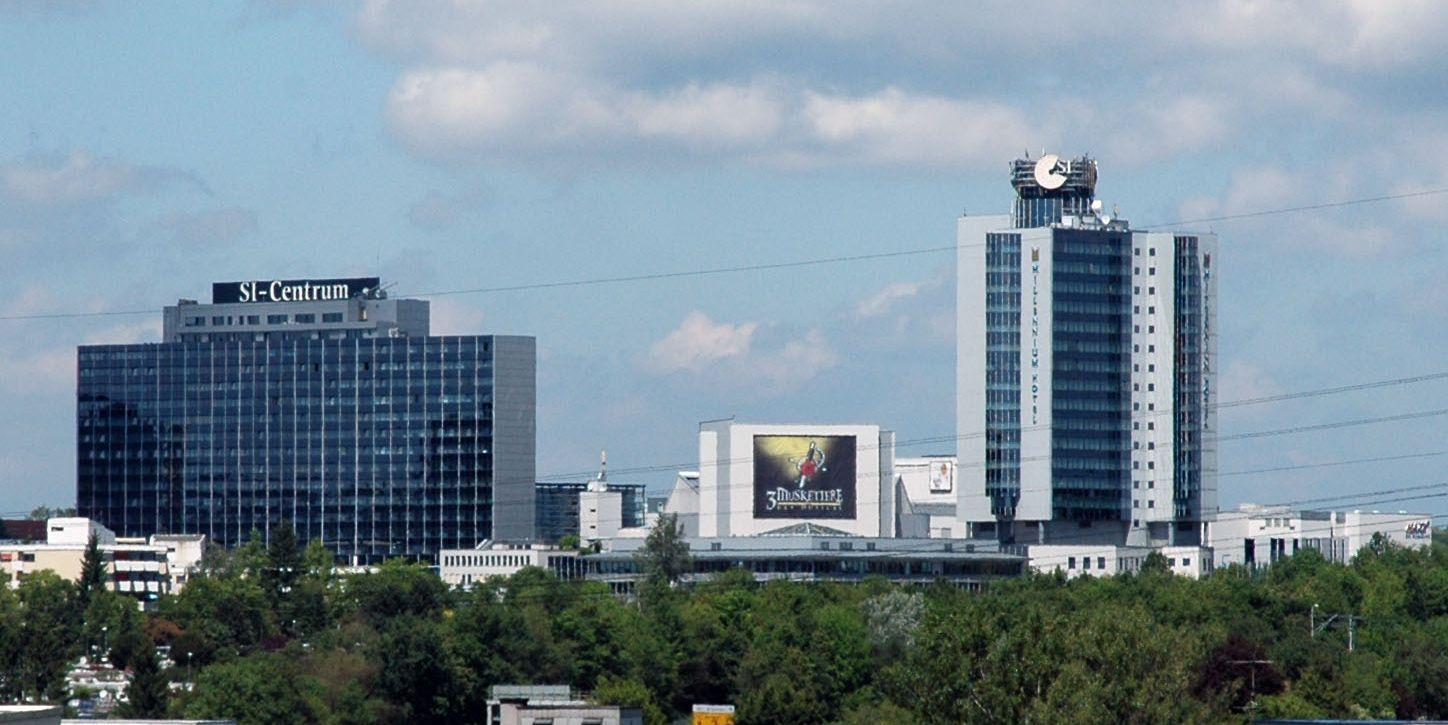
SI-Centrum in Stuttgart

This list of tallest buildings in Stuttgart ranks high-rise buildings and important landmarks that reach a height of 50 meters (160 feet).

Stuttgart's history of skyscrapers began 1928 with the completion of the 16-storey, 61-meter-high (200-foot) Tagblatt-Turm. The architect Ernst Otto Oßwald planned the tower in 1924 opposite the Schocken department store as the first high-rise building in Stuttgart and the first reinforced concrete high-rise in Germany.

As in every major city, there are also remarkable but unrealized high-rise plans in Stuttgart. Mention should be made here of a so-called Trump Tower (Germany), which was a topic of discussion from 2001. This planned Trump Tower was to be erected on the exposed Prag, a hill on the northern edge of Stuttgart's valley basin. The 180-metre-high office, hotel and residential tower, which was estimated to cost around 230 million euros at the time, was “controversial among the population, the local council and the architectural and real estate scene.” The skyscraper was initially to be built in Berlin. When this project failed, the alternatives of Frankfurt/M. and, in April 2001, Stuttgart were discussed. After 2003, the plans were no longer pursued.

A special landmark on the Stuttgart skyline is the 217-meters-high Fernsehturm Stuttgart, built in 1956. It was the first telecommunications tower in the world constructed from reinforced concrete, and it is the prototype for many such towers worldwide.

Rank	Name	Image	Height m (ft)	Floors	Year completed	Use / Note
	Stuttgarter Fernsehturm		216.6 m (711 ft)		1956	Telecommunications tower, Tallest structure in Stuttgart.
1	Porsche Design Tower		87.1 m (286 ft)	25	2022	Tallest high-rise building in Stuttgart, Office, Restaurant, Hotel
2	Skyline Living		79.7 m (261 ft)	21	2017	Residential, Office
3	LBBW-Hochhaus		73.8 m (242 ft)	19	2005	Headquarters of LBBW
4	Colorado		73.5 m (241 ft)	20	2007	Office
5	Dormero Hotel		71.6 m (235 ft)	20	1991	Hotel, Part of SI-Centrum
6	Julius-Brecht-Hochhaus		69.9 m (229 ft)	23	1969	Residential
7	Cloud No. 7		68.5 m (225 ft)	19	2017	Luxury high-rise in the Europaviertel.
8	StEP 6		67.5 m (221 ft)	16	2002	Headquarters of Debitel AG
9	Hannibal, Im Asemwald 52–62		67.4 m (221 ft)	24	1973	Residential
10	Hochhaus am Allianz Park		67.2 m (220 ft)	18	2025	Headquarters of Allianz Lebensversicherungs-AG
11	Hannibal, Im Asemwald 2–10		66.8 m (219 ft)	24	1972	Residential
11	Hannibal, Im Asemwald 22–32		66.8 m (219 ft)	24	1973	Residential
13	Salute-Hochhaus		64.4 m (211 ft)	21	1963	Residential
14	EnBW-City		63.8 m (209 ft)	17	2009	Headquarters of EnBW
15	Wohnhochhaus „Fasan II“		63.6 m (209 ft)	22	1965	Residential
16	Atlanta BusinessCenter		63.45 m (208 ft)	17	1992	Office
17	Daimler Hauptverwaltung		63.2 m (207 ft)	15	1958	Office, Height with star is 78.3 m.
18	Mercedesstr. 120		63 m (207 ft)	14		Office
19	Turm am Mailänder Platz		61.3 m (201 ft)	19	2021	Hotel
20	Tagblatt-Turm		61.2 m (201 ft)	16	1928	First high-rise building in Stuttgart.
21	Wohnhochhaus „Fasan I“,		60.6 m (199 ft)	21	1965	Residential
22	Stiftswaldstr. 1		60.5 m (198 ft)	21	1969	Residential
23	MPA Hochhaus		58.6 m (192 ft)	14	1969	Office
24	Fortuna		57.7 m (189 ft)	17	1996	Residential
25	Lorenzstr. 10		57.2 m (188 ft)	14	1975 (refurbishment 2012)	Headquarters of Alcatel-Lucent
26	Bülow-Turm		56.4 m (185 ft)	16	1991	Office
27	Kollegiengebäude 2		56.3 m (185 ft)	12	1964	University building
27	Kollegiengebäude 1		56.1 m (184 ft)	12	1960	University building
29	Sturmvogelweg 2–10		54.9 m (180 ft)	20	1975	Residential
29	Romeo-Hochhaus		54.9 m (180 ft)	19	1957	Residential
29	Paul-Lincke-Str. 5		54.9 m (180 ft)	18	1972	Residential
32	Naturwissenschaftliches Zentrum NWZ1 + NWZ2		53.9 m (177 ft)	11	1974	University building
32	GENO-Hochhaus		53.9 m (177 ft)	13	1972 (refurbished 2004)	Office
34	Van Technology Center (VTC)		53.84 m (177 ft)	14	2005	Office, Mercedes-Benz
35	Reinsburgstr. 21–27		52.8 m (173 ft)	15	1975 (refurbishment 2006)	Seat of Allianz
36	Fontana (Pullmann-Hotel)		52 m (171 ft)	15	1990	Hotel
36	Dessauer Str. 5		52 m (171 ft)	18	1971	Residential
38	Im Lauchau 31		51.1 m (168 ft)	17	1969	Residential
39	Mönchfeldstr. 110		50.08 m (164 ft)	18	1962	Residential
40	Stuttgart International		50.04 m (164 ft)	18	1969	Hotel, Part of SI-Centrum
41	Paul-Lincke-Str. 10		50 m (164 ft)	16	1974	Residential

== More high-rise buildings in the region ==
Rank	Name	Image	Height m (ft)	Floors	Year completed	Use / Note	City
1	Schwabenlandtower		107 m (351 ft)	34	On Hold	Residential	Fellbach
2	Bitzer-Hochhaus		75 m (246 ft)	18	2019	Headquarters of Bitzer	Sindelfingen
3	Wüstenrot Tower		72 m (236 ft)	19	1974	Headquarters of Wüstenrot	Ludwigsburg
4	Sky-Hochhaus		70 m (230 ft)	18	2016	Residential	Bietigheim-Bissingen
5	Festo-Hochhaus		66 m (217 ft)	16	2015	Festo Automation Center	Esslingen
6	Bosch-Hochhaus		60 m (197 ft)	12	2015	Bosch Research Center	Renningen

== See also ==
- List of tallest buildings in Germany
- List of tallest structures in Germany
