= Bitzer =

Bitzer may refer to:

== People with the surname ==
- Billy Bitzer (1872–1944), American pioneering cinematographer
- Donald Bitzer (1934–2024), American co-inventor of plasma display
- Marc Bitzer (born c. 1965), German business executive

== Other ==
- Bitzer SE, one of the leading companies in the area of refrigeration and air conditioning technology
- Bitzer, one of the leading characters of the TV series, Shaun the Sheep
