= Al-Asmakh Tower =

- برج الأصمخ
- Interactive map of the Al-Asmakh Tower area
- Alternative names: IBQ Tower

General information
- Status: Completed
- Type: Commercial offices
- Location: Majlis Al Taawon Street, Doha, Qatar
- Coordinates: 25°19′9.57″N 51°31′32.43″E
- Construction started: 2012
- Completed: 2017
- Owner: Regency Group Holding; International Bank of Qatar

Height
- Antenna spire: 227 m (745 ft)

Technical details
- Material: Concrete / Steel
- Floor count: 34

Design and construction
- Architects: Arab Engineering Bureau; Kohn Pedersen Fox
- Structural engineer: WSP Global; EHAF Engineering; Davis Langdon
- Main contractor: Dorra Group

Al-Asmakh Tower (formerly the IBQ Tower) is a building in West Bay Area in Doha, Qatar. Its design was inspired by New York City landmark Empire State Building. Its height is 227 meters (745 ft). It has five basements and 34 floors. The tower exterior features a modern glass façade reflecting the skyline. The tower is a single-function tall building, with 85% or more of its usable floor area dedicated to office space.
