= Aspire Tower =

- The Aspire Tower in two views

- Location within Doha

General information
- Type: Skyscraper; Hotel
- Architectural style: Modern architecture
- Location: Aspire Zone Road, Al Waab Street, Doha, Qatar
- Coordinates: 25°15′44.9″N 51°26′41.4″E
- Construction started: September 9, 2005
- Completed: May 22, 2007
- Opening: May 30, 2007
- Cost: €133,395,000
- Owner: Ministry of Sports and Youth (Qatar)
- Landlord: Aspire Zone

Height
- Tip: 300 m (980 ft)
- Roof: 300 m (980 ft)
- Top floor: 238 m (781 ft)
- Observatory: 238 m (781 ft)

Technical details
- Floor count: 36
- Floor area: 35,000 m^{2} (380,000 sq ft)
- Lifts/elevators: 17

Design and construction
- Architects: Hadi Simaan; AREP
- Structural engineer: Arup; Buro Happold
- Main contractor: Midmac Contracting; Buro Happold; Swissboring

Website
- TheTorchDoha.com

Aspire Tower, also known as The Torch Doha, is a 300-metre-tall (980 ft) skyscraper hotel located in the Aspire Zone complex in Doha, Qatar. Designed by architect Hadi Simaan and AREP and engineer Ove Arup and Partners, the tower served as the focal point for the 15th Asian Games hosted by Qatar in December 2006.

The tower is currently the second tallest structure and building in Doha and Qatar. In 2023, it was surpassed by the Lusail Plaza Towers. The tower has also been known as Khalifa Sports Tower or Doha Olympic Tower.

== Construction and use ==
Close-up of tower's apex

The tower was a landmark of the 2006 Asian Games due to its size and proximity to the main venue, the Khalifa International Stadium. Construction began in April 2005.

The final form consists of a 1-to-1.8-metre-thick, reinforced-concrete cylinder (the core), varying from 12 to 18 metres in diameter, encircled with radiating networks of cantilevered steel beams on each floor of its building modules. The modules themselves are composed of steel columns, metal decking, concrete slabs and outer tension and compression ring beams, which support glass-paneled outer walls. The bottom of each module is covered with glass fiber reinforced concrete. Beams, as well as steel struts tying all the structural components together, are bolted through the concrete core and hence are anchored into place, transferring vertical loads from perimeter columns and ring beams to the core. The façade consists of an energy-efficient glass skin, and helps efficiently maintain comfortable temperature levels in the desert climate.

The building was constructed by companies Midmac and BESIX subsidiary Six Construct and was completed in November 2007 at a final cost of €133,395,000.

== Occupancy ==
The tower houses a five-star hotel, a sports museum, a health club with a cantilevered swimming pool, a revolving restaurant, and an observation deck. Landmark of Qatari Hospitality,5 Star Luxury Hotel,163 Room & Suites Flying Carpet Restaurant, Three Sixty Revolving Restaurant; also served as a giant torch for the 15th Asian Games.

== Pool ==
The Tower features a Swimming pool 80 meters (260 feet) above ground that is cantilevered from the core, and extends out 12 meters (39 feet) from the facade. Elliptical in plan, the pool is supported on a substantial steel truss structure some 4 meters (13 feet) deep.

== LED and 360 Screen ==
LED technology installed across the front allows the creation of effects; each LED is individually controllable in all colors. The largest external 360 screen measured 11,345 m^{2} (112,116 ft^{2} 81 in^{2}), and was achieved by Sports City Advertising Qatar, in Doha, Qatar on 31 May 2022. Sports City Advertising attempted this record to showcase the Torch Building that has the screen all around it. The Torch Tower has a new record for tallest external 360 degree screen set up which is recorded in Guinness.

== See also ==
- Hyperboloid structure
- List of towers
- Aspire Park
