= Qatar Petroleum District =

Suburb in Doha, Qatar

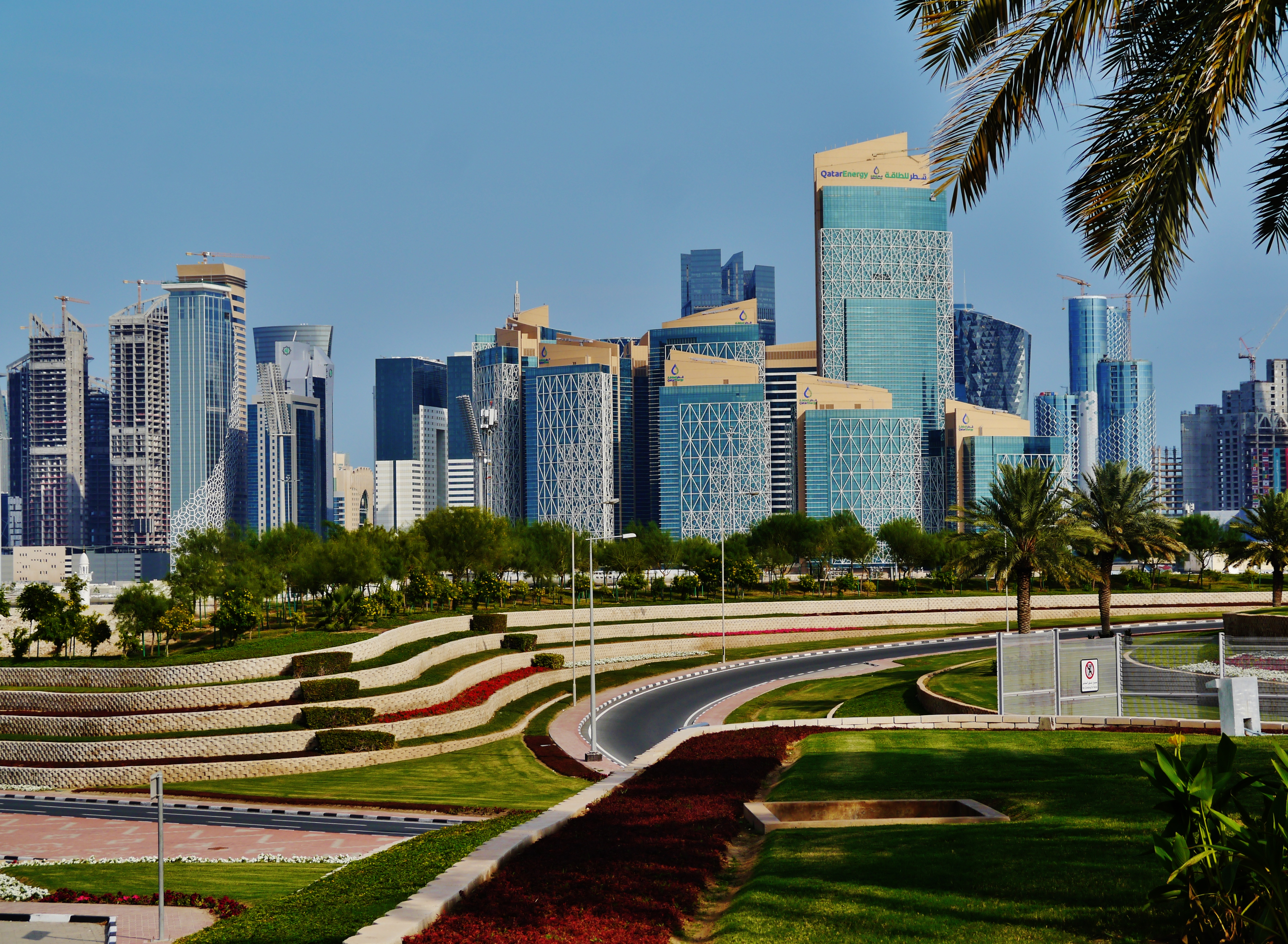
- Interactive map of the Qatar Petroleum District area

General information
- Status: Completed
- Type: Commercial offices / Hotel
- Location: Majlis Al Taawon Street, West Bay Doha, Qatar
- Coordinates: 25.31670°N 51.51897°E
- Construction started: 2012
- Completed: 2016
- Owner: Government of Qatar
- Management: Qatargas Industries Qatar QAPCO Gulf

Height
- Antenna spire: 222 m (728 ft) (Tower 7)

Technical details
- Material: All-Concrete
- Floor count: 307 (Overall)

Design and construction
- Architect: Arab Engineering Bureau
- Structural engineer: Aljaber Engineering l.l.c Midmac Contracting Co. W.L.L.
- Main contractor: AECOM; Bouygues Batiment International

Qatar Petroleum District is a set of ten towers office buildings on the Majlis Al Taawon street, West Bay Doha, Qatar. It is the headquarters for QatarEnergy. The tallest building called Tower 7 is 222.07 metres (728.6 ft) high and has 47 floors. It was begun in 2012 and completed in 2016. The design, construction and comments of this collection have been under the supervision of AECOM. Qatar Petroleum District towers a five-star business hotel, restaurants, conference centre, mosque and other amenities.
