= Doha Tower =

- برج الدوحة
- Interactive map of the Doha Tower area
- Alternative names: Doha High Rise Office Building, Burj Doha, Burj Qatar

General information
- Status: Completed
- Type: Commercial offices
- Location: Corniche Street, West Bay; Doha, Qatar
- Coordinates: 25°19′3.10″N 51°31′41.93″E
- Construction started: 2005
- Completed: 2012
- Cost: Qatari Riyal 455 million US$125 million)
- Owner: Sheikh Saud bin Muhammed Al Thani
- Operator: Hamad Bin Saoud Group

Height
- Architectural: 238 m (780.8 ft)

Technical details
- Material: Concrete / Steel
- Floor count: 46; 3 below ground
- Floor area: 110,000 m^{2} (1,184,000 sq ft)
- Lifts/elevators: 23 elevators

Design and construction
- Architect: Jean Nouvel
- Architecture firm: Consulting Engineering Group
- Structural engineer: Terrell Group
- Main contractor: China State Construction Engineering Corporation

Website
- burjdoha.qa

Doha Tower, also known as Burj Doha (Arabic: برج الدوحة), and previously named as Burj Qatar and Doha High Rise Office Building, is a high rise tower in West Bay, Doha, Qatar. On October 18, 2012, the building received the CTBUH Skyscraper Award for the Best Tall Building Worldwide from the CTBUH. The $125-million office building, designed by French architect Jean Nouvel, has a height of 238 metres (781 ft), with 46 stories.

In 2004 the project was first named as the Doha High Rise Office Building and after completion of construction in 2012 was branded as Burj Doha by the owner, H. E. Sheikh Saud bin Muhammed Al Thani. The public has noted the building's "phallic form", suggestive of what Nouvel calls a "fully assumed virility." After the people called it informally the Burj Qatar, the Government of Qatar renamed it officially the Doha Tower.

The Doha Tower comprises 46 floors above ground, three floors below ground and a total gross floor area of approximately 110,000 m^{2}. It has no central core, leaving more internal space available to its occupants. The design is unique, the first skyscraper with internal reinforced concrete diagrid columns, which form a cross (X) shape that connects with the eye-catching cylindrical facade. The design expresses the local culture, connecting the very modern with ancient Islamic designs (Mashrabiya). Islamic screens were designed to shade the building from high temperatures as well as the unpleasant sand residue found on glass throughout the region. The building is designed to hold offices for businesses wishing to operate in the diverse business district of West Bay.

The Doha Tower was owned by Sheikh Saud bin Muhammed Al Thani and managed by Hamad Bin Saoud Group. It is currently the seventh tallest building in Doha.

== Features ==
The $125 million building, designed by French architect Jean Nouvel, has a height of 238 metres (781 ft), with 46 stories. The service core is slightly off-center to maximize interior space and flexibility of use. This was also achieved by providing diagrid columns of reinforced concrete set in the shape of a cross.

Its cylindrical shape is reminiscent of Nouvel's Torre Glòries office building in Barcelona, which served as conceptual inspiration for the Doha Tower. Unlike the Barcelona building, The Doha Tower's façade was designed for local conditions: the brise soleil was "constructed of multi-layered patterns invoking ancient Islamic screens designed to shade buildings from the sun."

The German Lindner Group provided the NORTEC raised access floor system for the tower. The floor panels, consisting of calcium sulphate, feature unique dimensions of 500 x 500 mm and are applied with a special scratch-resistant covering made of galvanised steel sheets. The covering is an exclusive design by Lindner. The pinnacle of the cylindrical building, which has a base of 45 metres (148 ft) in diameter, is crowned by a dome.

== Awards and recognition ==
Doha Tower in West Bay skyline at dusk

The Chicago-based Council on Tall Buildings and Urban Habitat named it the best tall building in the Middle East and North Africa in 2012, citing the way the cylindrical building uses "ancient Islamic patterns" in its design.

At the fifth annual Middle East Architect Awards 2012, the tower received the "Overall Project of the Year" award. On this occasion, Jean Nouvel was presented with a specially-made scale model of the tower.

== See also ==
- List of tallest buildings in Doha, Qatar
- The Gherkin, in London
