= Tornado Tower =

Office skyscraper in Doha, Qatar

Coordinates: 25°19′09″N 51°31′40″E

- برج تورنادو
- Tornado Tower

- Location within Doha

General information
- Status: Completed
- Location: Doha, Qatar

Height
- Height: 640 feet (195 m)

Technical details
- Floor count: 52

Other information
- Parking: underground

The Tornado Tower, also called the QIPCO Tower, is a high-rise office skyscraper in the city of Doha, Qatar. The building stands at a height of 640 feet (195 m) tall with 52 floors.

== History ==
Construction began in 2006 and was completed in 2008. It was built by MIDMAC and the BESIX Group subsidiary Six Construct. On delivery, the tower featured several innovations in energy efficiency and CO_{2} reduction. Tornado Tower was designed and supervised by CICO Consulting Engineers

== Description ==
Ground-level view of Tornado Tower

The Tornado Tower is located on a 199,000 square foot plot of land, but only occupies 32,300 square feet of it, leaving plenty of open space around it to enhance its aesthetic. The circular footprint of the building, with a 97-foot diameter at its base, includes a ground level restaurant and a bank, among other amenities. Sixteen elevators serve the approximate 904,000 square feet of office space the building contains. The building is accompanied by 1500 car parking spaces housed within three levels of underground basement parking. Due to the hour glass shape of the building, the total rentable office space available on each floor varies from 13,560 to 25,800 square feet. This offers high flexibility in both the size of office space available and the layout of office space on each floor. The top three floors of the tower are luxury office space and are surrounded by terraces and balconies. The top level of the VIP floors has direct access to a helicopter landing pad.

It is the tenth tallest building in the city of Doha. It is considered a variation of London's Gherkin. HEC Paris has a campus in the building. The Canadian and the Australian embassies are located in the building.

== See also ==
- List of tallest buildings in Doha, Qatar
- 30 St Mary Axe
