= Commercialbank Plaza =

Coordinates: 25.313479°N 51.518283°E

- Location within Doha

General information
- Status: Completed
- Type: Commercial offices
- Location: Doha Corniche, Qatar
- Completed: 2009

Technical details
- Material: Concrete / steel / glass

Design and construction
- Architects: LOM architecture and design, London

Commercialbank Plaza is a 22-storey office building on the North Shore of Doha, Qatar, built as a new head office by the Commercial Bank of Qatar. The building was opened on May 13, 2009 by Sheikh Hamad bin Jassim bin Jaber Al Thani, Prime Minister and Foreign Minister of Qatar.

The building is 148m high and provides 120,000sqm of floor space. It is the ninth tallest building in Qatar. Commercialbank Plaza was designed by LOM architecture and design, an architectural practice based in London.

The building is the first in the Middle East with a fully transparent glass facade, achieved with the use of a triple skin of glass and blinds which track the sun. The building design has been described in the press as 'Transparency writ large' Tenants of the Commercialbank Plaza include the US law firm Squire Patton Boggs and Sotheby's.
