= Lusail Plaza Towers =

Coordinates: 25°25′3.6″N 51°30′21.5″E

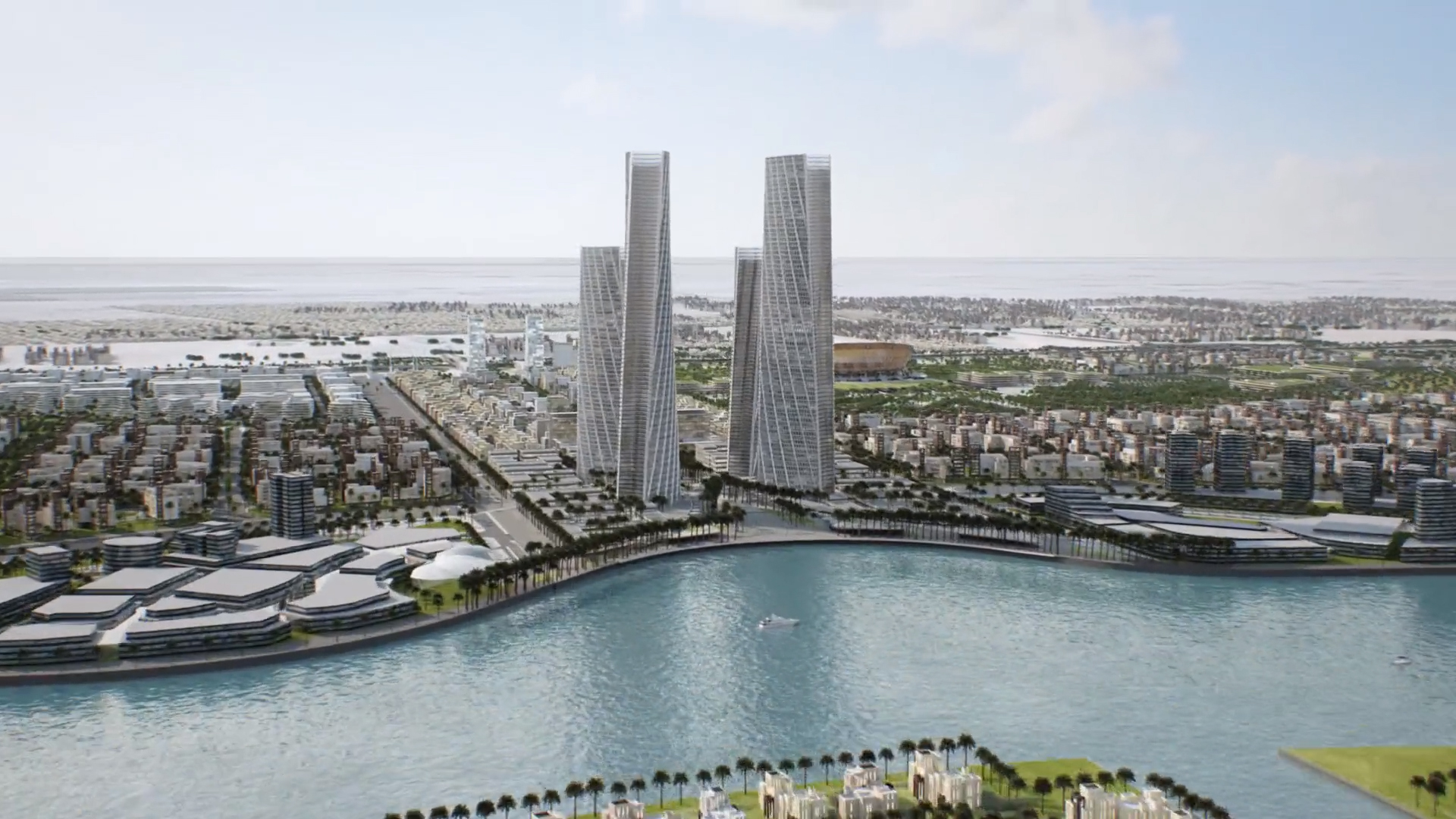
- Alternative names: Lusail Plaza Complex

General information
- Status: Completed
- Type: Commercial offices
- Location: Al Sa'ad Plaza, Commercial Boulevard, Lusail, Qatar
- Construction started: 2020
- Completed: 2025
- Cost: US$530 million
- Owner: Qatari Diar Real Estate Investment Company

Height
- Antenna spire: 301 m (988 ft); 215 m (705 ft)

Technical details
- Material: Concrete/steel
- Floor count: 70 (Towers 3 & 4); 48 (Towers 1 & 2)

Design and construction
- Architect: Foster and Partners
- Main contractor: Hyundai Engineering & Construction

Lusail Plaza Towers or Al Sa'ad Plaza Towers are a set of 4 office towers on the Al Sa'ad Plaza, Commercial Boulevard, Lusail, Qatar. The two buildings are 301 metres (988 ft) and the two others 215 m (705 ft) high and has 220 floors in the four towers complex. Construction began in 2020 and was completed in October 2023 (core and shell+ lobby finishings). Since 2023, towers 3 and 4 of the plaza have stood as the tallest buildings in Qatar.

The 1.1 million-square-metre development is the headquarters for the Qatar National Bank, Qatar Central Bank and Qatar Investment Authority alongside several other global organisations including Qatari Diar. Lusail Plaza Towers was designed by Foster & Partners.The Lusail Plaza Tower features an oval shape that rotates 90 degrees as it rises, naturally shifting the viewing axis outward to provide stunning views of the surrounding city and coastline.

== See also ==
- List of tallest buildings in Doha, Qatar
