= Al Faisal Tower =

- Interactive map of the Al Faisal Tower area

General information
- Status: Completed
- Type: Commercial offices
- Location: Conference street, Doha, Qatar
- Coordinates: 25°19′31.38″N 51°31′34.84″E
- Construction started: 2008
- Completed: 2011
- Owner: Sheikh Faisal Bin Qassim Al Thani; Sheikha Aisha Bint Abdullah Al Thani

Height
- Antenna spire: 227 m (745 ft)

Technical details
- Material: All-Concrete
- Floor count: 54

Design and construction
- Architect: Diwan Al Emara
- Main contractor: Al Habtoor Group; Buro Happold; Qatari Modern Maintenance Company

Website
- alfaisalholding.com Al Faisal Tower

Al Faisal Tower is a 54-storey office building on the Conference street, Doha, Qatar. The building is 227.07 metres (745.0 ft) high and has 54 floors. It was begun in 2008 and completed in 2011. Al Faisal Tower is situated in Doha business district. The tower features vast office spaces, an auditorium, cafeteria, and parking for 570 cars, providing everything businesses need to thrive.
