= World Trade Center Doha =

- Interactive map of the World Trade Center Doha area

General information
- Status: Completed
- Type: Commercial offices
- Location: Al Dafna, Qatar
- Coordinates: 25.3135°N 51.5183°E
- Construction started: 2010
- Completed: 2013
- Owner: Qatar General Insurance & Reinsurance Co.

Height
- Antenna spire: 241 m (791 ft)

Technical details
- Material: Concrete / steel
- Floor count: 51
- Lifts/elevators: 27

Design and construction
- Architects: MZ & Partners
- Main contractor: Arabtec Holding PJSC

World Trade Center Doha is a 51-storey office building on the Doha Corniche in Al Dafna, Qatar. This tower belongs to Qatar World Trade Center. The building is 241.10 metres (791.0 ft) high and has 51 floors. It was begun in 2010 and completed in 2013.
