= Lycée Franco-Qatarien Voltaire =

Coordinates: 25.3569°N 51.5019°E

Lycée Franco-Qatarien Voltaire Arabic: المدرسة القطرية - الفرنسية فولتير

Location
- West Bay, Doha; Qatar

Information
- Established: 2008; 17 years ago
- Enrollment: 518 (2015)

Lycée Franco-Qatarien Voltaire (Arabic: المدرسة القطرية - الفرنسية فولتير) is a French international school in West Bay, Doha, Qatar, in proximity to the Institut français du Qatar and the University of Qatar. As of 2015 it has 518 students.

The school was established on 15 January 2008. It originated from an international convention agreed upon between the French and Qatari governments on 3 May 2007, which stipulates the establishment of the school. Nicolas Sarkozy and Tamim Bin Hamad Al Thani attended the inauguration.
