= Bitzer SE =

Manufacturer of refrigeration and air conditioning technology

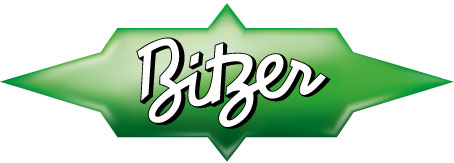
- Type: European Corporation (SE)
- Founded: 1934
- Headquarters: Sindelfingen, Germany
- Key people: Christian Wehrle (CEO), Rainer Große-Kracht (CTO), Martin Büchsel (CSMO), Frank Hartmann (CFO)
- Products: Products for refrigeration and air conditioning: Reciprocating compressors; Screw compressors; Scroll compressors; Heat exchangers; Pressure vessels
- Revenue: 1,12 billion Euro (2024)
- Number of employees: 4,500 (2024)
- Website: www.bitzer.de

Bitzer SE (Societas Europaea) is a manufacturer of refrigeration and air conditioning technology. In 2024, the company, which is headquartered in Sindelfingen, Germany, earned sales of €1,12 billion. Bitzer SE has 75 locations and, as of 2024, had approximately 4,500 employees worldwide.

== History ==
Martin Bitzer founded what would later become Bitzer in 1934 as Apparatebau für Kältetechnik. The company started out by manufacturing expansion valves and 2-cylinder DC piston compressors. By 1959, Martin Bitzer had expanded his company to 206 employees and was exporting his products to 56 countries.

In 1961, graduate engineer Ulrich Schaufler took over the Bitzer Kühlmaschinenbau GmbH company. He remained as its head until his death in 1979, when he was succeeded by his son, Peter Schaufler. The company had 270 employees and earned sales of 30 million German marks (DM).

== Growth ==
In the following years, Peter Schaufler founded over 40 subsidiaries on all five continents, including production locations in Germany, Portugal, China, Australia, South Africa, Brazil, Indonesia and the United States. Bitzer is active shareholder in various companies and, most recently, acquired Denmark-based control solutions manufacturer Lodam electronics a/s in 2007, the transport cooling division of the Finnish company Lumikko in 2011, and, most recently, the long-standing company Armaturenwerk Altenburg GmbH in 2013. In all of its subsidiaries, Bitzer insists on an environmental policy that conserves resources, and the company has earned a wide variety of certifications.

In 2008, the parent company was restructured as a European Corporation (SE), Bitzer SE.

== Products ==
The company manufactures components for refrigeration and air conditioning technology:

- Reciprocating compressors
- Screw compressors
- Scroll compressors
- Pressure vessels
- Heat exchangers

== See also ==
- BDR Thermea
