= Doka GmbH =

Company producing and supplying scaffolding

Doka
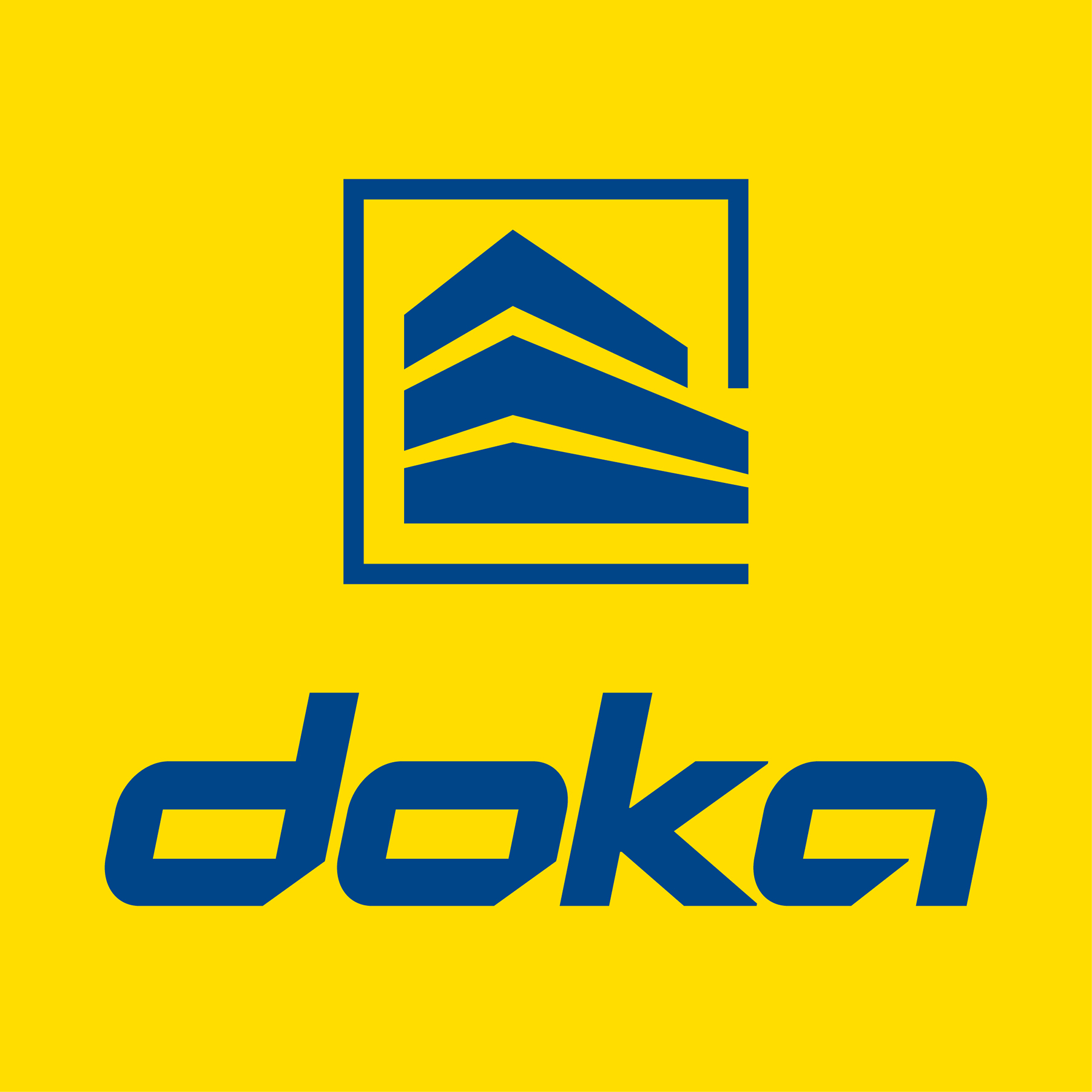
- Type: GmbH
- Industry: Construction
- Founded: 1958
- Headquarters: Amstetten, Austria
- Area served: Worldwide
- Key people: Robert Hauser, Viktor Sigl, Dr. Hubert Mattersdorfer (Executive Board)
- Products: Formwork, Engineering, Scaffolding
- Revenue: € 2,086 million (consolidated revenues of the Umdasch Group AG, annual report 2025)
- Number of employees: ~8,400
- Subsidiaries: 150
- Website: www.doka.com

Doka is an international producer and supplier of formwork and scaffolding used in all fields of the construction sector. It is a branch of the Umdasch Group AG (JSC) based in Amstetten, Austria. Doka has a worldwide workforce of ~8,400, with 150 branches in 54 countries. The consolidated revenues of the Umdasch Group AG amounted to 2,086 million euros in 2025.

== History ==
Doka, undasch The Store Makers and undasch Industrial Solutions make up the Umdasch Group AG with its headquarters located in Amstetten, Austria. In 1868 Stefan Hopferwieser founded the company St. & A. Hopferwieser as a carpenter in the town of Kollmitzberg. During the first 80 years of the company, the company had diversified into carpentry, sawmill wood and metal manufacturing, producing among others furniture, home appliances, metal hardware and packaging. In 1949, the engineer Josef Umdasch, who was married to Mathilde Hopferwieser (granddaughter of Stefan Hopferwieser) became the managing director of the company rebuilding and restructuring it. Josef Umdasch had been a board member of the company since 1939. In the 1950s prefabricated formwork production and store fitting production arms of the company crystallized into the two modern branches within the corporate group. In 1961 the corporate group was renamed to Umdasch KG. After Josef Umdasch retired his children Hilde and Alfred Umdasch directed the company.

=== Doka ===
In 1958 the company branch Doka was founded. The company founding and company name are interlinked with their first product and projects. In Austria in the 1950s, large infrastructural construction was underway including several hydro electrical dams. The dams were being built on the Danube river (Donau) and its tributaries by the Austrian utility "Donaukraftwerke" or DOKW for short, translating as 'Danube power stations'. Because of the great size of these structures, traditional timber beam formwork was too labor-intensive to form the large walls. Thus a large scale systematic and reusable formwork was developed, with the wooden formwork panels being produced and shipped from the Amstetten company. Originally the DOKW was the delivery address, but then became the product name (DOKW boards). Linguistic usage slurred DOKW into DOKA, which became the name of the newly founded company. In 1961 the first subsidiary was established in Germany, followed in 1977 by Brazil and Kuwait.

== Criticism ==
From 2021 to 2023, the company continued to generate revenues in Russia, with no official announcement regarding changes to its operations or manufacturing presence. In June 2024, LPF CAPITAL LLC became the new owner of the organization, and references to UMDASH GROUP AG and DOKA GMBH LLC were removed from the Unified State Register of Legal Entities. On 18 June 2024, the company's name changed from DOKA RUS LLC to REFORM LLC.

== Product and service overview ==
The formwork products, systems and design service include formwork panels, slab formwork, wall formwork, one-sided wall formwork, climbing formwork, tunnel formwork, dam formwork, bridge formwork (cast-in-place balanced cantilever bridge, concrete arch bridge and steel combination bridge formwork), shoring / falsework, tie systems and field support, software and training. The company is also a global supplier of scaffolding solutions for a varied spectrum of applications. Doka's business is based on a combination of production, equipment sale & rental, engineering and maintenance. Most of the formwork production takes place at Doka's central plant in Amstetten. The Doka three-ply sheets are made in the branch plant in Banská Bystrica in Slovakia. With the acquisition of MFE 2024, Doka also has production capabilities in the Southeast Asia region.

Another area of Doka's business is digital solutions aimed at increasing productivity in construction. At bauma 2025, the company presented Doka 360, an integrated platform that digitally maps all central stages of the formwork process – from planning and ordering to material management and returns.

== Projects ==
Projects built using Doka Formwork

- 2004–2010: Burj Khalifa (Dubai, United Arab Emirates)
- 2008–2013: European Central Bank (Frankfurt, Germany)
- 2012–2015: Lotte World Tower (Seoul, South Korea)
- 2015–2020: Central Park Tower (New York, United States)
- 2016–2022: Varso Tower (Warsaw, Poland)
- 2016–2022: Aftetal Bridge (Bad Wünnenberg, Germany)
- 2017–2020: Exchange 106 (Kuala Lumpur, Malaysia)
- 2018–2023: Sydney Metro (Australia)
- 2019–2024: Karlatornet (Gothenburg, Sweden)
- 2019–2025: A16 Rotterdam Bridge (Netherlands)

== Sustainability Goals and Commitments ==
Doka aims to achieve net-zero emissions by 2040.

Doka is the first company in the formwork and scaffolding industry to commit to the Science Based Targets initiative (SBTi), and its sustainability targets are being validated against scientific criteria.

In June 2024, as a member of the German Concrete Formwork Quality Association (Güteschutzverband Betonschalungen Europa e.V., or GSV), Doka helped spearhead the introduction of the first industry-wide minimum standards for calculating Product Carbon Footprints (PCF) in its sector. Since then, PCF data conforming to the new GSV standard have been available for more than 7,000 Doka products.
