= West Bay (Doha) =

- Area
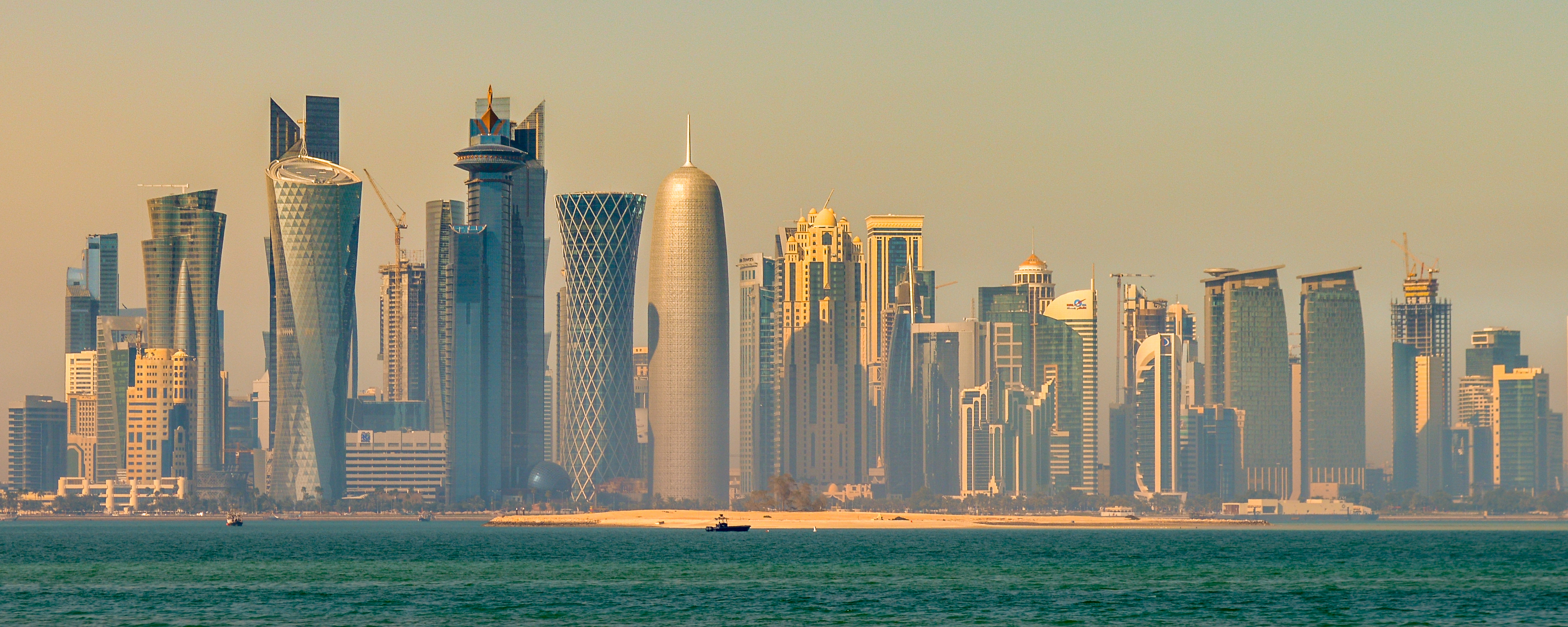
- The skyline of the Al Dafna district of West Bay

- Location within Doha Location within Qatar
- Coordinates: 25.3246°N 51.5307°E
- Country: Qatar
- Municipality: Doha

West Bay (Arabic: الخليج الغربي) is an area in Doha, Qatar that encompasses the city's east coast districts, namely, Al Qassar, Al Dafna, West Bay Lagoon, and Onaiza. West Bay includes many modern buildings unlike other, older districts of Doha. Most of the tallest skyscrapers in Qatar are found in this area.

== History ==
American architect William Pereira was tasked by the Qatari government with envisioning a transformative urban development project in the 1980s, colloquially referred to as the 'New Doha', situated directly north of the pre-existing city. Unlike the prior Llewelyn-Davies plan, Pereira's proposal did not seek to overhaul the existing urban fabric of Doha. Instead, it focused primarily on establishing new development areas in areas dredged in the late 1970s, with only incidental overlap with the old city.

Pereira's plan introduced several key elements aimed at reshaping the urban landscape. Firstly, it advocated for the extension of the ringroad system to the north, facilitating connectivity between the historic center of Doha and the emerging development zones in the northern reaches. Secondly, Pereira proposed the creation of cul-de-sac residential neighborhoods, reminiscent of Western suburban models, to accommodate the burgeoning population. Additionally, he endorsed the earlier proposal by Llewelyn-Davies to enhance the waterfront Doha Corniche by undertaking extensive dredging of the low-lying sand deposits north of Doha Port.

The reclaimed land resulting from these dredging activities, supplemented by other excavations, formed the foundation for what is now known as 'West Bay'. Despite its transformation, some residents still colloquially refer to this area as dafna, a term derived from Arabic meaning landfill, reflecting its origins. West Bay was earmarked to host Qatar University, the first national university, along with a new central business district, residential accommodations for senior Qatari executives, and a designated hotel and resort area. Notably, the iconic Sheraton Grand Doha Resort & Convention Hotel, which would dominate Doha's skyline for years, first emerged in this area in 1978, before being completed in 1981. Connectivity between West Bay and old Doha was facilitated by a network of primary north-south roads and secondary transverse connectors.

In Qatar's first census conducted in 1986, West Bay was the tentative name for seven newly established zones of Doha along the coastline: Zone 60 and Zone 62 to Zone 67. Contemporary usage of the term refers to all the districts currently occupying these zones, which currently includes Al Qassar, Al Dafna, West Bay Lagoon (official name Leqtaifiya), Onaiza, and Hazm Al Markhiya.

== Transport ==
Mowasalat manages a shuttle service for the West Bay Area under the auspices of the Ministry of Transport and Communication. The sole route is circular, running through 36 stops at 12-minute intervals from 6 AM to 9 PM on all days of the week. It passes through most of the hotel and business districts in West Bay.

The underground West Bay Metro Station began operation on 8 May, 2019. It was launched during Phase 1 of Doha Metro's Red Line North.

== Education ==
One of Lycée Franco-Qatarien Voltaire's branches, Qatar's French international school, is located in West Bay. Schools in West Bay include:

Name of School	Curriculum	Grade	Genders	Official Website	Ref
International School of Choueifat	International	Kindergarten – Secondary	Both	N/A	
Lycée Franco-Qatarien Voltaire - West Bay branch	International	Kindergarten – Secondary	Both	Official website	
Newton International School - West Bay branch	International	Secondary	Both	Official website	
Qatar International School	International	Kindergarten – Secondary	Both	N/A	

== Gallery ==
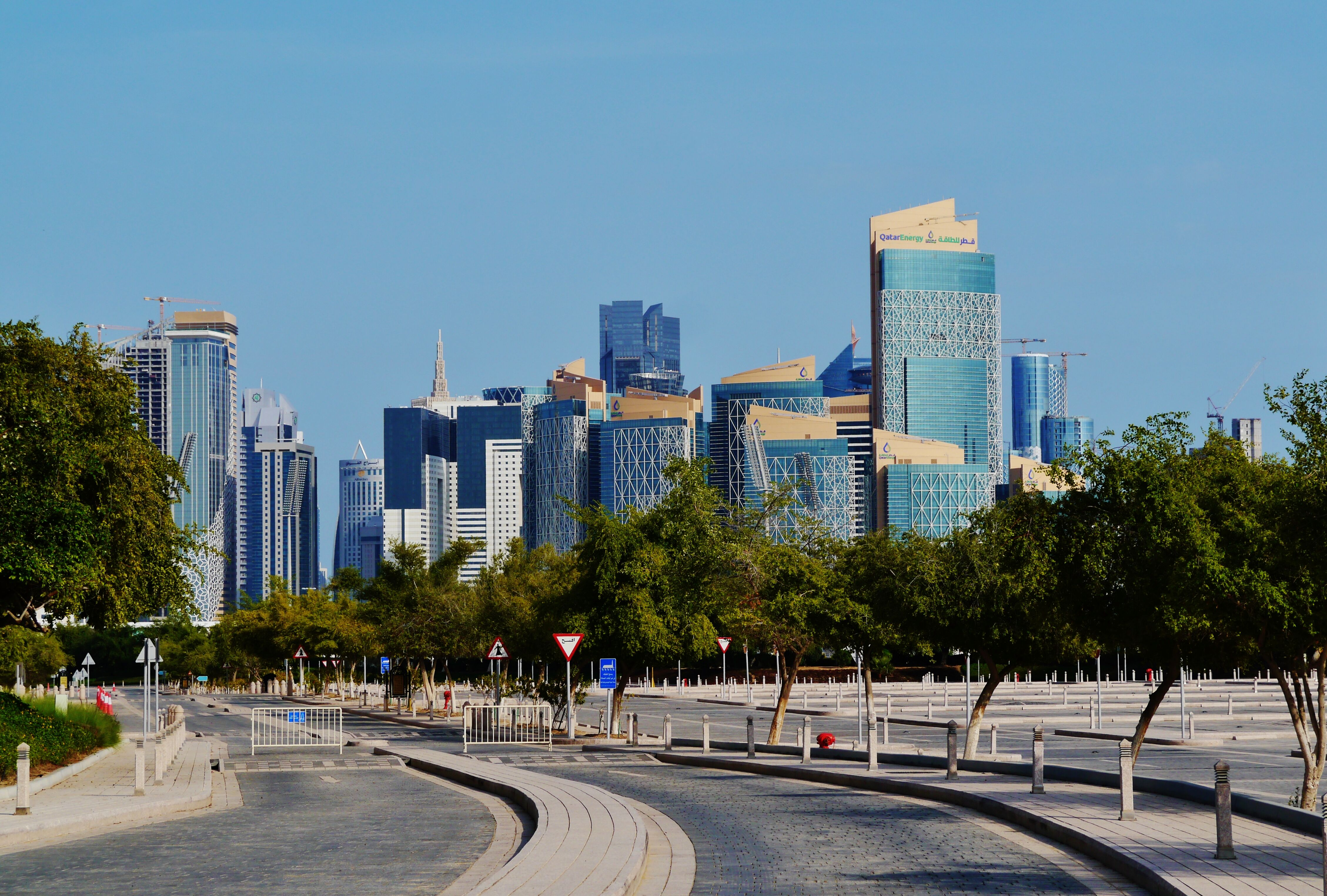
Skyline of West Bay, Doha

== See also ==
- List of tallest buildings in Qatar
