= Oxygen Park =

Park in Education City, Qatar

Oxygen park
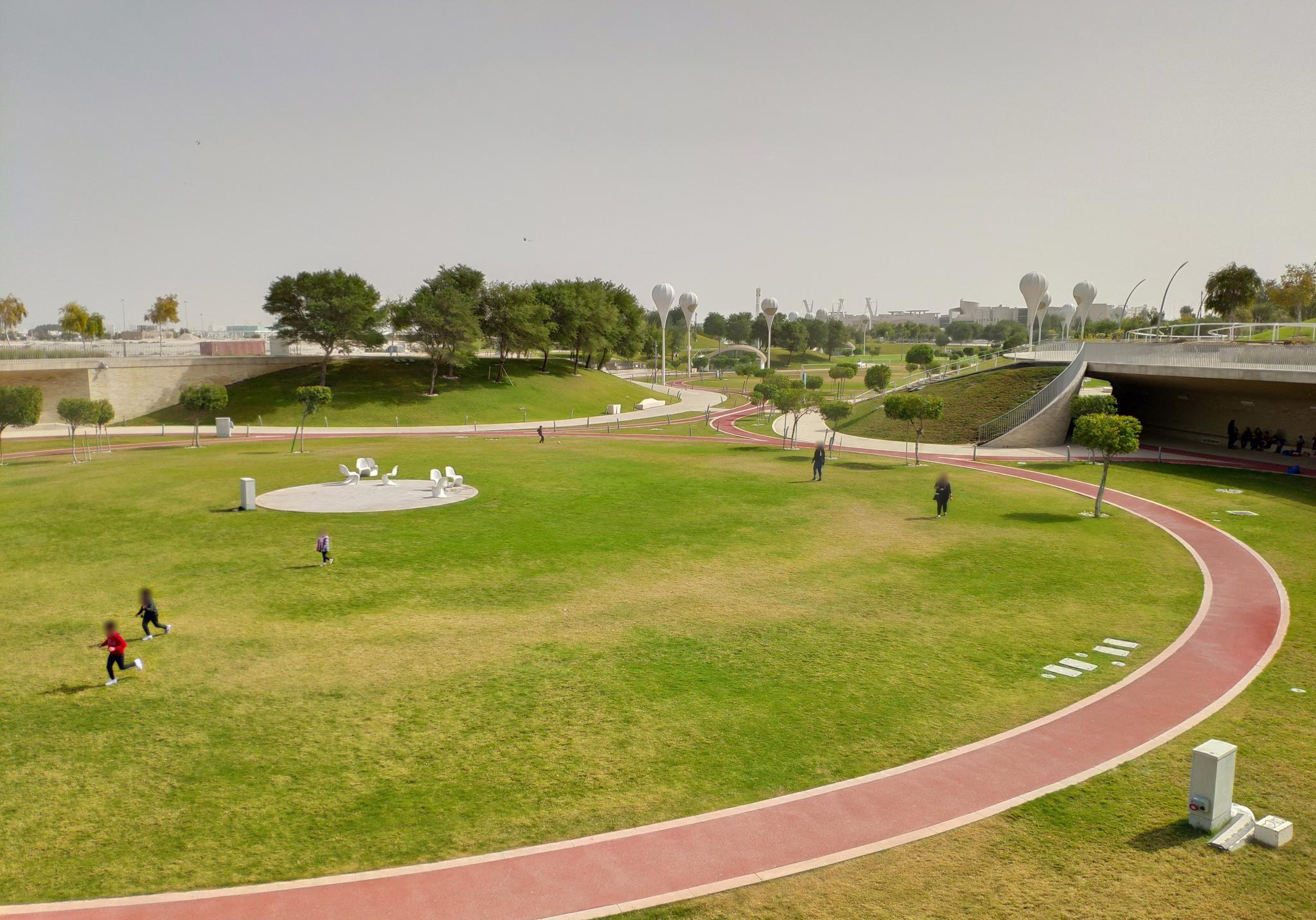

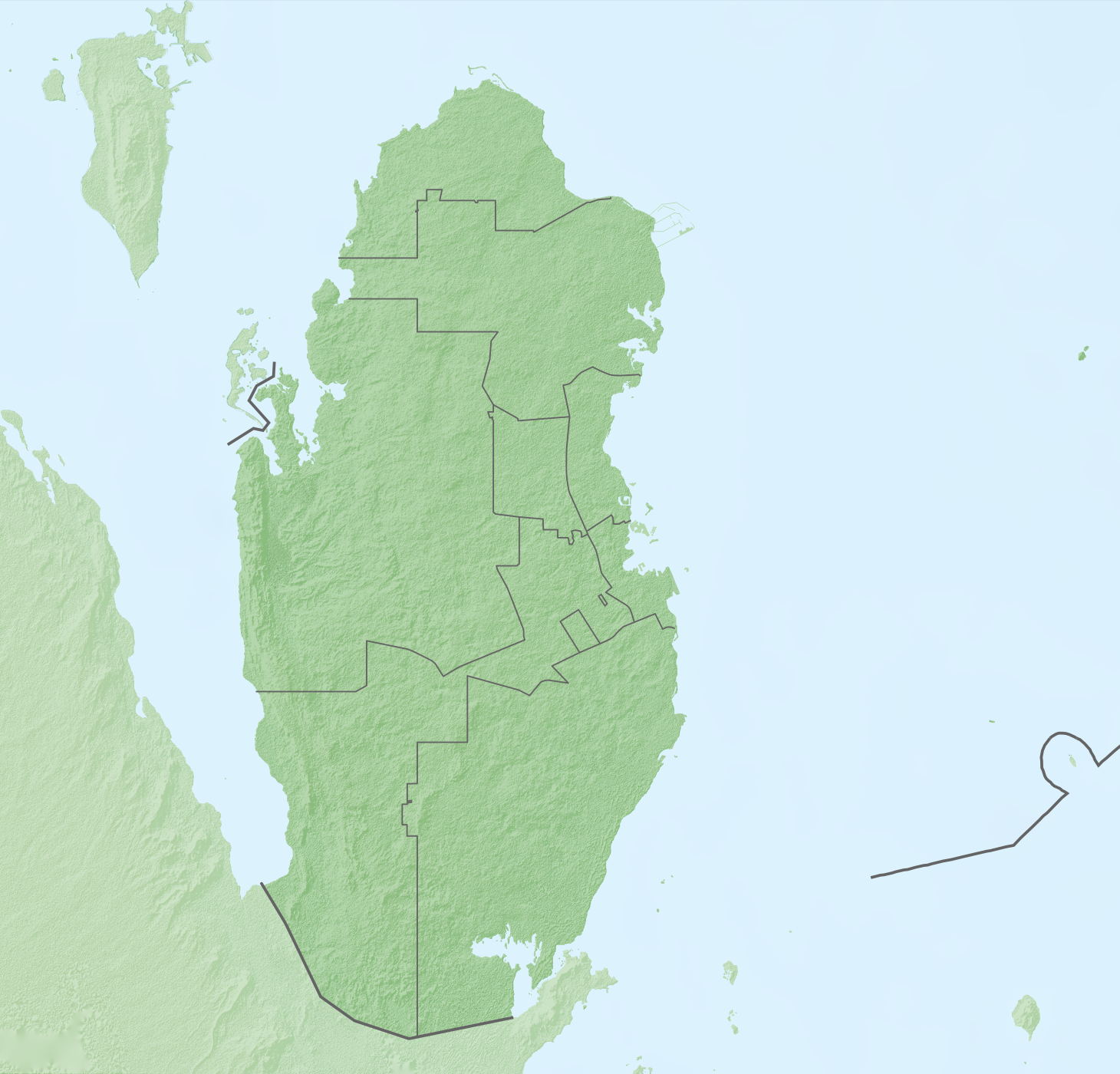
- Location within Qatar
- Location: Education City, Qatar
- Coordinates: 25°18′31″N 51°26′27″E
- Area: 0.13 km^{2} (0.050 sq mi)
- Created: 2019
- Operator: Qatar Foundation
- Open: 06:00–21:00
- Parking: Yes
- Public transit: Qatar National Library station

Oxygen Park is a public park in Education City on the outskirts of Qatar’s capital, Doha. Located between the Qatar National Library and Education City Mosque to the North, and Education City Stadium to the South, the park has two "zones" – the Western side for sports (including multi-use pitches and semi-covered running track), and the Eastern for recreation (including "children’s playground, an amphitheatre and individual gardens"). The park also includes several water features and distinctive "balloon lights".

The Qatar Foundation commissioned AECOM to design the park, under Erik Behrens and James Haig Streeter as Architecture, and Landscape Design Lead respectively:

Looking to the Qatari natural landscape for clues was critical. ‘We drew our inspiration from the wind-eroded rocks and fluid land formations in Qatar,’ says Behrens. ‘Oxygen Park is designed to convey a beautiful and fluid surface; its undulations enable it to flow effortlessly as ground, roof, wall, and ceiling.’

The park has been used for community events – such as an annual walkathon to raise awareness of diabetes. From December 2019, Monday evenings became designated as "Ladies-Only Night".

== Environmental impact ==
Oxygen Park was developed as a large, landscaped zone intended to expand green space and improve local environmental conditions in an area dominated by major institutional buildings. Its design links different parts of the Education City campus through shaded, vegetated pathways and incorporates running tracks, rest areas, and partially sunken sports facilities to encourage outdoor activity while mitigating heat exposure. Drawing on Qatar's desert landforms, the park's undulating terrain combines planted surfaces with built elements to create cooler microclimates and a varied topography, complemented by night lighting.

== Awards ==
- Finalist: World Architecture Festival (2017)
- Silver: International Association for Sports and Leisure Facilities (IAKS) (2019)
- Popular Choice: Architizer A+Awards, in the category "Landscape & Planning, Public Park" (2019)
- Silver: International Design Awards, in the category "Architecture, Landscape" (2020)
