= List of mosques in Qatar =

This is a list of mosques in Qatar. As of 28 May 2017, there were a total of 2,000 mosques recorded in the country.

Name	Images	Location		Year	Remarks
Name	Images	Locale	City	Year	Remarks
Abu Hamour Central Mosque		Abu Hamour	Al Rayyan		
Education City Mosque: Minaretein Center		Education City	Al Rayyan	2013	
Hamza bin Abdulmuttalib Mosque			Al Wakrah	1984	
Abdulla Bin Zaid Al Mahmoud Islamic Cultural Center Mosque		Al Souq	Doha	2008	Tallest mosque in Qatar
Ahmed Bin Majid Mosque		Al Messila	Doha		
Al Asmakh Mosque		Mushayrib	Doha		
Al Hitmi Mosque		New Fereej Al Hitmi	Doha		
Al Qubaib Mosque			Doha		
Al Shouyoukh Mosque		Mushayrib	Doha	1914	
Ali Bin Ali Mosque		Nuaija	Doha		
Asian City Mosque		Asian Town	Doha		
Doha Mosque			Doha		
Ghanem Ali Abdullah Qassem Al Thani Mosque		Al Mansoura	Doha		
Green Mosque		Fereej Bin Omran	Doha		
Hamad International Airport Mosque		Hamad International Airport	Doha	c. 2017	
Imam Muhammad ibn Abd al-Wahhab Mosque		Ad-Dawhah	Doha	2011	National Mosque of Qatar. Can accommodate up to 30,000 worshippers
Imam Zain Ul Abidin Mosque		Al Mansoura	Doha		
Katara Mosque		Katara Cultural Village	Doha	2010	
Katara Cultural Village Mosque (Golden Mosque)		Katara Cultural Village	Doha		
Mosque Juma Bin Omran Al Qubaisi		Fereej Bin Omran	Doha		
Omar Bin Al-Khattab Mosque		Madinat Khalifa South	Doha		
West Bay Mosque		West Bay	Doha		
Pearl Qatar Masjid			The Pearl-Qatar		
Barzan Towers Mosque		Barzan Towers	Umm Salal; Mohammed		

== See also ==
- Islam in Qatar
- Lists of mosques
