= Al Wahda Arches =

Monumental arches in Doha

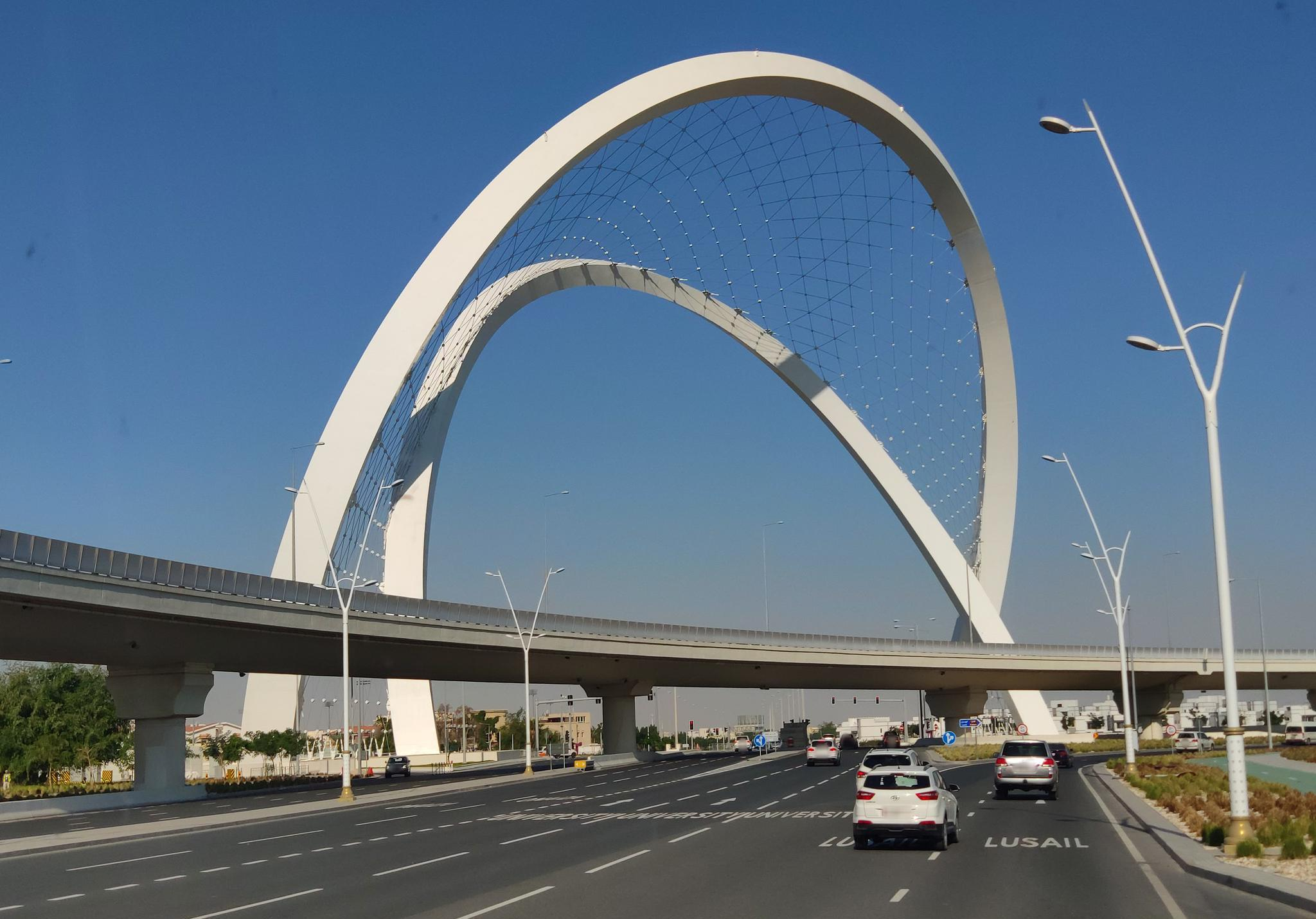
- Interactive map pinpointing the arches' location
- Location: Lusail Expressway, Onaiza, Qatar
- Coordinates: 25°20′7″N 51°31′6″E
- Designer: Erik Behrens, AECOM
- Type: Arch
- Material: Steel & cable
- Width: 147m, 140m
- Height: 100 m, 78m
- Weight: 9,000+ tons
- Beginning date: 2013
- Completion date: 2020
- Dedicated date: 16 December 2017
- Dedicated to: "5/6": the Qatar diplomatic crisis

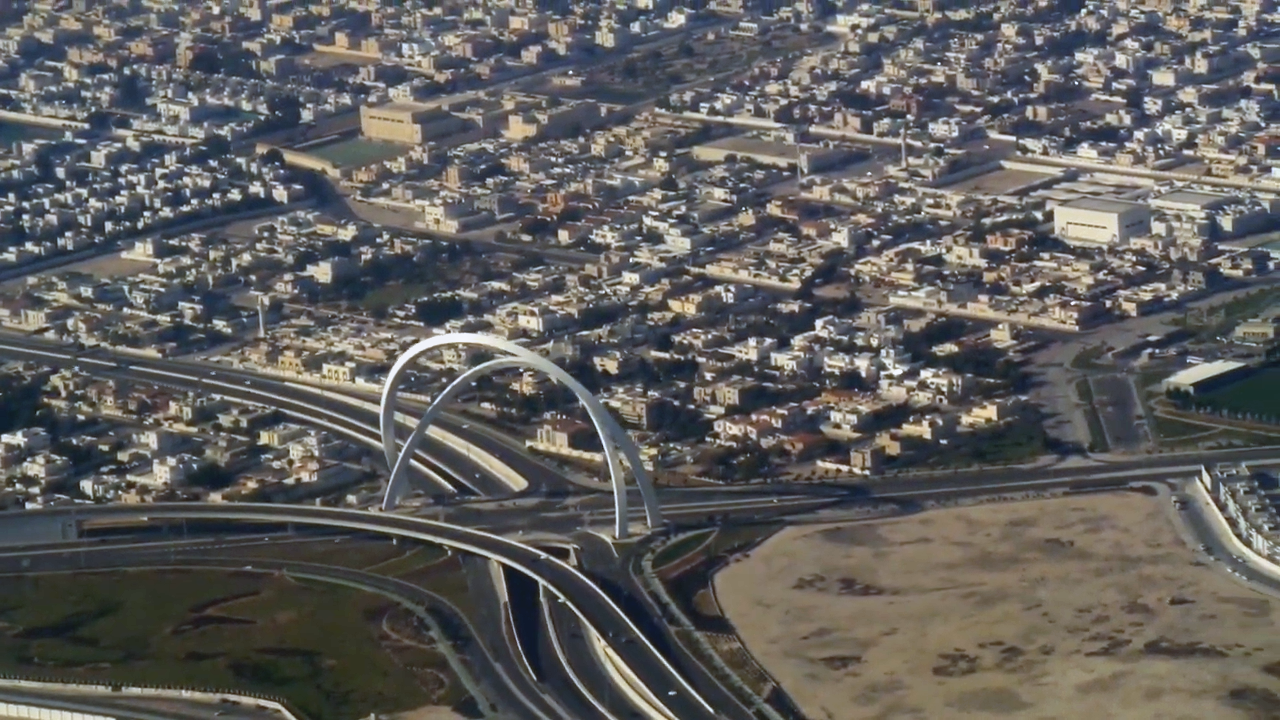
Aerial view of the arches, highway interchange, and neighbouring Onaiza district (2020)

The Al Wahda Arches (also called 5/6 Arch, Qatar Arch, Gateway Arch) is a monumental pair of 20° inclined steel arches, spanning the "5/6 interchange" of the Lusail Expressway, Qatar which connects West Bay with Lusail City. It is the tallest monument in the country and has received a 2020 International Design Award and 2018 ENR Global Best Project award. Intended to be viewed while in motion as an "immersive public artwork", the arches are connected to each other by a cable net – a reference to Qatar's pearl diving heritage. The structure itself consists of 54 large steel pieces, weighing over 9,000 tons, while the base of the arches are clad in Limra Limestone from Turkey.

The monument, suspended viewing platform, and associated visitor centre were commissioned by Ashghal (the public works authority), designed by German architect Erik Behrens for AECOM, engineering by Maffeis Engineering and constructed by Eversendai – with an intended completion date of 2016. At a cost of $74m, construction began in December 2013 and after partial completion was inaugurated along with the expressway for National Day celebrations in December 2017. Due to construction occurring during the 2017 Qatar blockade the arches have taken on a local cultural significance of "resilience", and are now known as the 5/6 Arches (referring to 5 June when the diplomatic crisis began) along with "5/6 interchange" and the neighbouring "5/6 park". The construction expressway interchange and Arches replaced the "Rainbow (Arch) roundabout" which used to stand on the site.

In 2018 Ashghal and Qatar Post issued a set of commemorative stamps featuring the arches which integrated with an associated augmented reality phone application.
