= Qatar Philharmonic Orchestra =

The Qatar Philharmonic Orchestra (QPO), a member of Qatar Foundation for Education, Science and Community Development, was founded in 2007 by Sheikha Mozah bint Nasser Al Missned, the then Emir of Qatar's consort. The orchestra performs both Western and Middle Eastern works, encouraging the enjoyment and creation of such music by the people of Qatar and the region.

== History ==
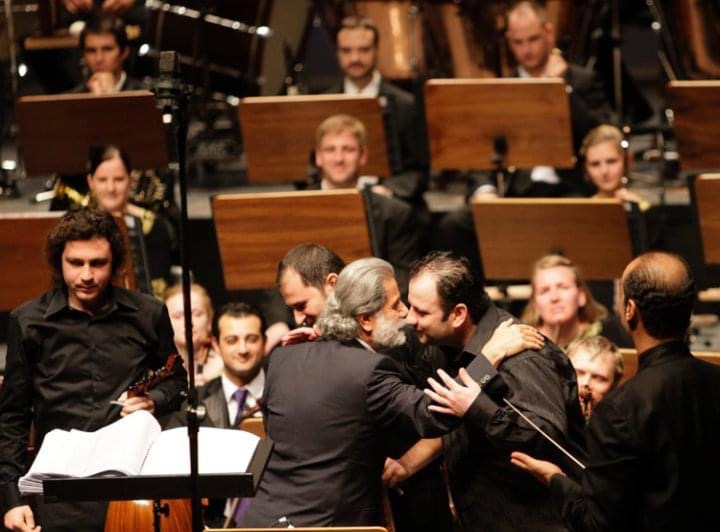
Qatar Philharmonic Orchestra in 2008

Kurt Meister, the former managing director of the Bavarian Radio Symphony Orchestra, was invited by Sheikha Mozah to create an orchestra of international standard and recruited players from over 30 countries, maintaining the high standards and traditions of the German musical school.. In 2008, Egyptian conductor Nader Abbassi was appointed musical director and Lebanese musician Marcel Khalife became the artistic director and composer-in-residence.

The QPO's inaugural concert was held in Doha on 30 October 2008, conducted by Lorin Maazel. The 101-player orchestra's home is now the Opera House at the Katara Cultural Village. In advancing its role in the promotion of Middle East composers, the orchestra now has nearly forty such works in its repertoire. In addition to its Qatar season, the orchestra has also toured internationally, in the Middle East (Syria), Europe (UK, France, Austria, Italy, Russia), Asia (China) and the United States (New York and Washington).

On 8 September 2014, during a European tour, the orchestra's musical director Han-na Chang resigned, citing "persistent administrative difficulties and irreconcilable artistic differences".

In May 2015, the orchestra performed a 50 minute concert in the MIA Park in celebration of the Commercial Bank of Qatar’s 40th anniversary.

The orchestra performed Nikolai Rimsky-Korsakov’s “Capriccio Espangnol” in May 2016 at the Qatar National Convention Center. Also that year, they attended the BBC Proms Festival and performed Tchaikovsky’s Symphony No. 5 and Rachmaninov’s piano concert.

In February 2018, they performed multiple concerts, including “Pictures at an Exhibition”, “Philharmonic at the Library: Flute with Strings”, “Kitajenko Conducts Shostakovich 10”, as well as the “Video Games Live 2018”.

Together with guest conductor Alastair Willis, the orchestra performed “The Desert Rose” symphony in October 2022, which was commissioned for their 10 year anniversary in 2019.

The new musical season was opened in September 2023 with “Gulf Folk Meets The Philharmonic”, conducted by Kamoliddin Urinbaev and held at the Abdul Aziz Nasser Theatre. The QPO had performed the composition for the first time in August 2022 to promote the preservation of Gulf music.

QPO announced in October 2023 they were cancelling all previously scheduled events in an effort to stand in unity and “redirect their focus toward the pressing needs in Palestine”.

In April 2025, the QPO performed for the first time in South Korea at the Aram Nuri Theater in Goyang a year after the QPO and the Goyang Cultural Foundation signed a Memorandum of Understanding marking the 50th anniversary of the diplomatic relationship between the countries.

In September 2025, the QPO participated in the Qatar-Argentina Year of Culture with its first performance in Latin America, at Teatro Colón in Buenos Aires.

== Artistic and musical directors ==
- Marcel Khalife, artistic director 2008–2010
- Nader Abbassi, musical director 2008–2011
- Michalis Economou, musical director 2011–2013
- Han-na Chang, musical director 2013–2014

== Guest conductors ==
List of guest conductors who have conducted the Qatar Philharmonic Orchestra:

- Lorin Maazel
- Dmitri Kitayenko
- Gianluigi Gelmetti
- Andreas Weiser
- Marc Minkowski
- James Gaffigan
- David Afkham
- Philippe Auguin
- Bob Ross
- Pablo Mielgo
- Alastair Willis
- James Shearman

== See also ==
- Music of Qatar
