= Erik Behrens =

German architecture

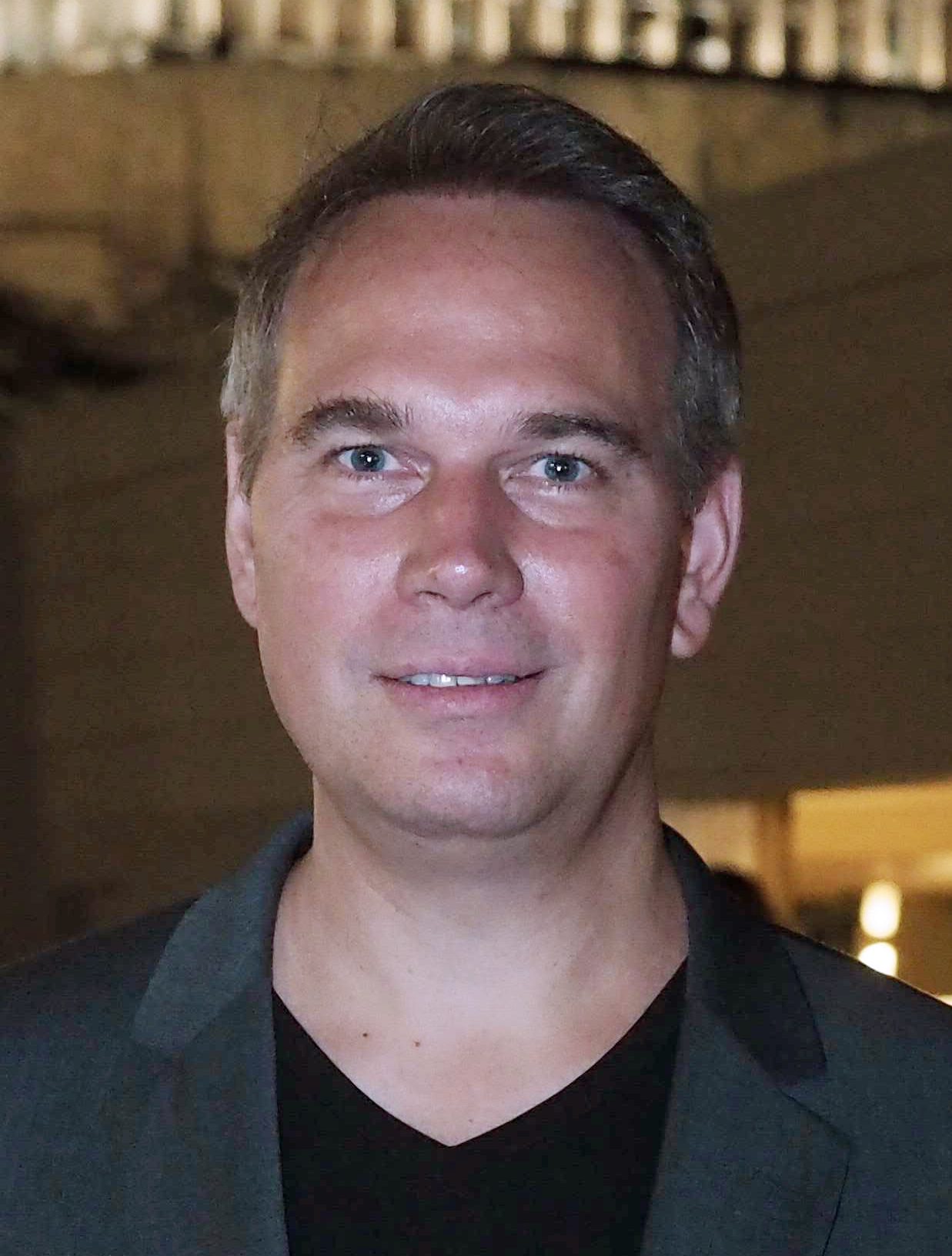
- Behrens in 2022
- Born: May 14, 1975 (age 51)
- Education: Karlsruhe Institute of Technology
- Occupation: Architect
- Notable work: Waterloo International railway station, Al Wahda Arches, Gordie Howe International Bridge, Oxygen Park
- Website: https://www.erikbehrens.com/

Erik Behrens (born 14 May 1975) is a German architect and designer.

== Early life and career ==
In 2006, Behrens moved to London to join EDAW, where he worked on the design of the London 2012 Olympic Park and its legacy development. His projects have received several national and international awards, including the International Architecture Awards from the Chicago Athenaeum.

In 2020, the Al Wahda Arches in Qatar, a 100-meter-tall immersive public artwork, was completed. Behrens served as AECOM’s architecture design director and project leader for the renovation of the Waterloo International railway station. In Saudi Arabia, he is leading the design for an equestrian village in the AlUla desert.

Behrens is the architect of the Gordie Howe International Bridge, the longest Cable-stayed bridge in North America. Additionally, he and James Haig Streeter were commissioned by the Qatar Foundation to design Oxygen Park in Doha.

== Awards ==
- 2022 Chicago Athenaeum International Award – Al Wahda Arches
- 2021: Chicago Athenaeum International Award – Oxygen Park
- 2018: ENR Best Global Projects Award – Lusail Expressway
- 2017: Finalist World Architecture Festival – Oxygen Park
- 2016: World Architecture News Future Project Award 2016 – Underwater Domes of Istanbul, Turkey
- 2008: Shenzhen-Hong Kong Biennale of Urbanism and Architecture – Greenmetropolis
- 2008: European Urban and Regional Planning Award- Greenmetropolis

== Publications ==
- Archplus, 168 Chinesischer Hochgeschwindigkeits Urbanismus, 2004, ISSN 0587-3452
- MADA in Model, 2005, ISBN 7-80177-305-5/TU
- Urban Landscape 07, Fuck the Context, Technische Universitaet Muenchen, 2007
- Updating Germany 100 Projects for a Better Future, Hatje Cantz Verla, 2008, ISBN 978-3775722629
- New Geographies, Harvard University Graduate School of Design, 2008, ISBN 978-1-934510-13-1.
- Stadt Bauen, Deutscher Stadtebaupreis 2008, Jovis, ISBN 978-3-939633-88-4
- Ecological Urbanism, Co-published by Harvard University Graduate School of Design and Lars Muller Publishers, 2016, ISBN 978-3037784679
- Territories, Die Stadt aus der Landschaft entwickeln, Birkhauser, 2019, ISBN 978-3-7643-8844-7

== Gallery ==
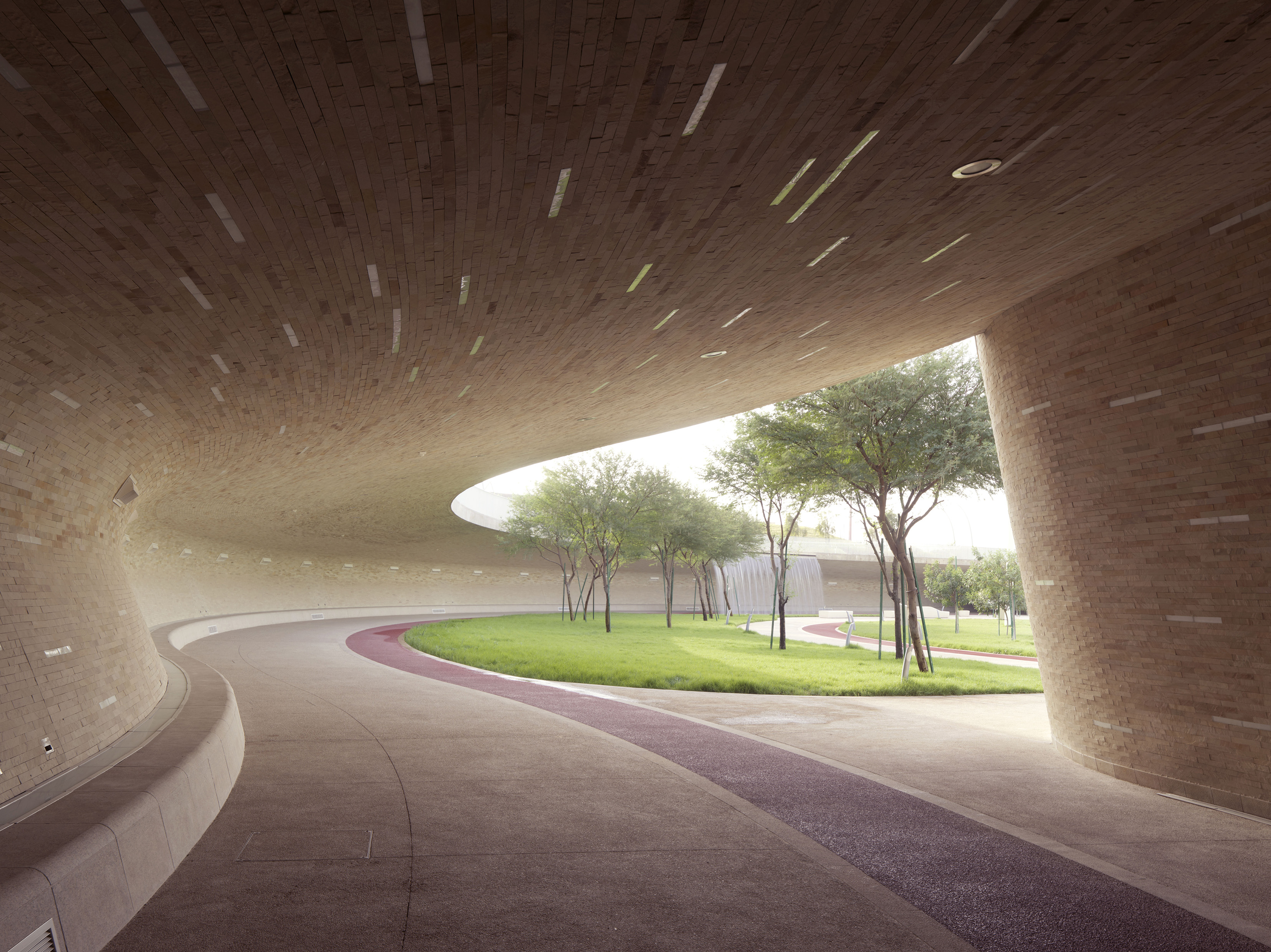
Qatar’s capital, Doha, Oxygen Park

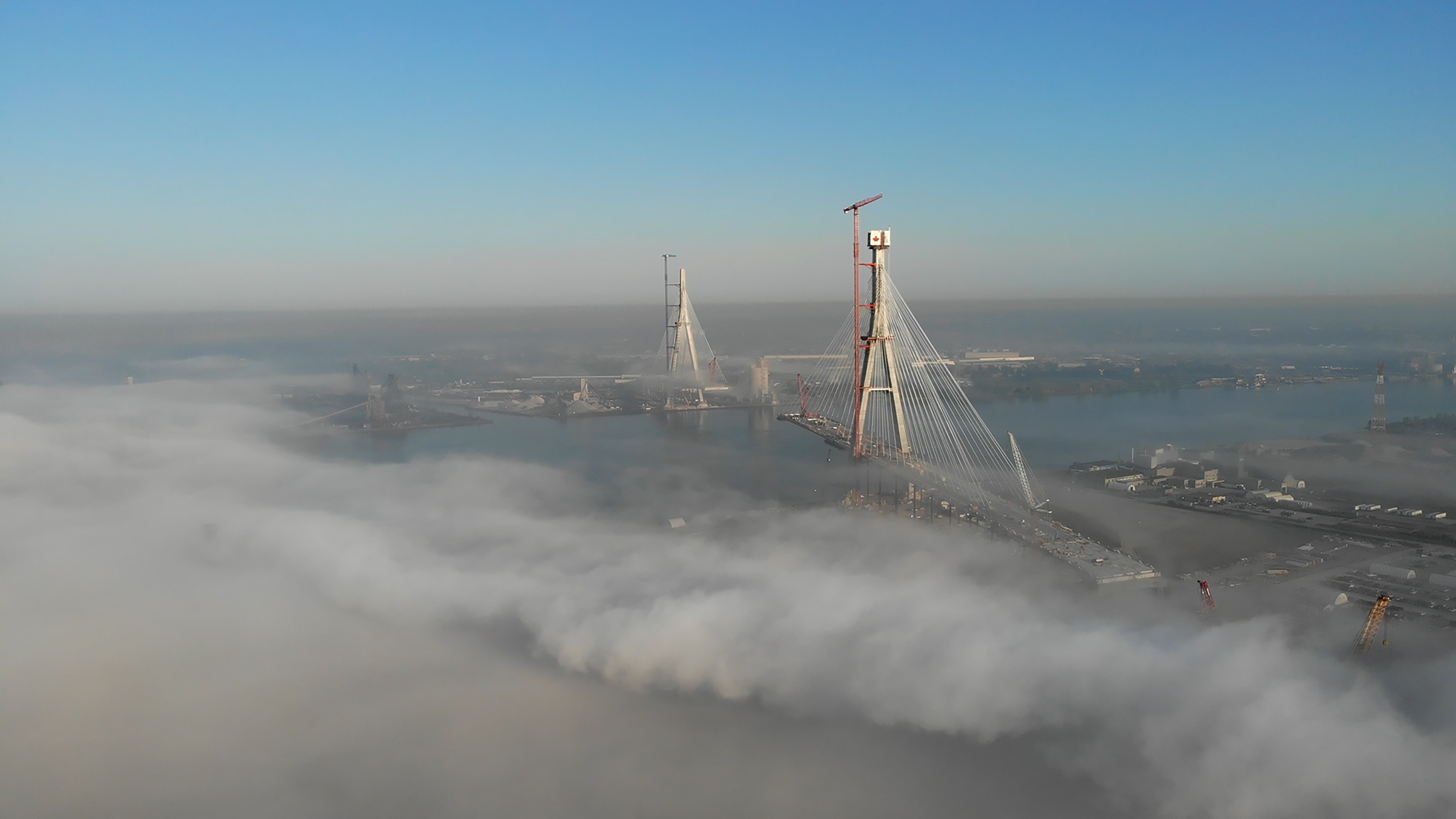
Detroit River, Canada–United States border, Gordie Howe International Bridge

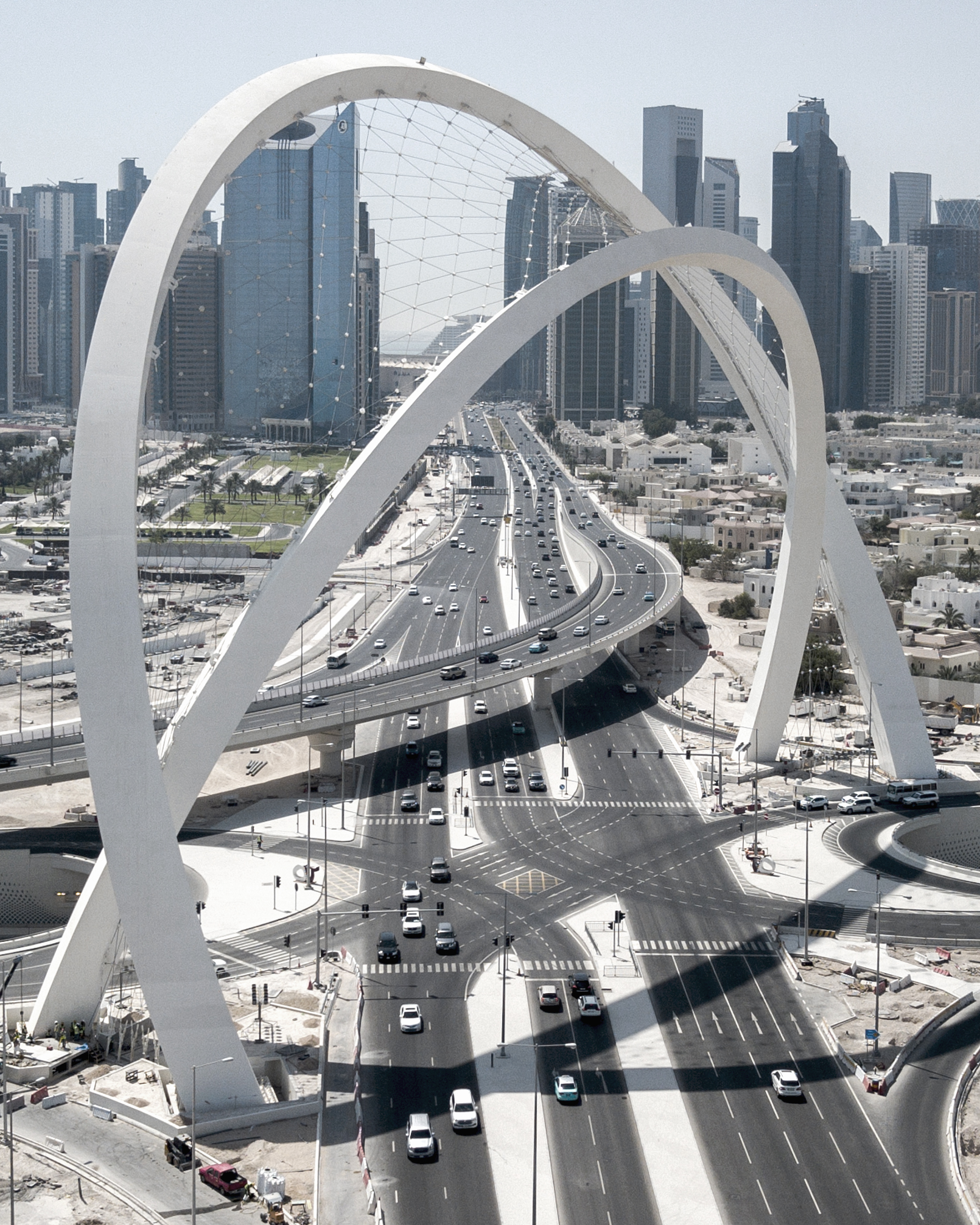
Lusail Expressway, Onaiza, Qatar, Al Wahda Arches

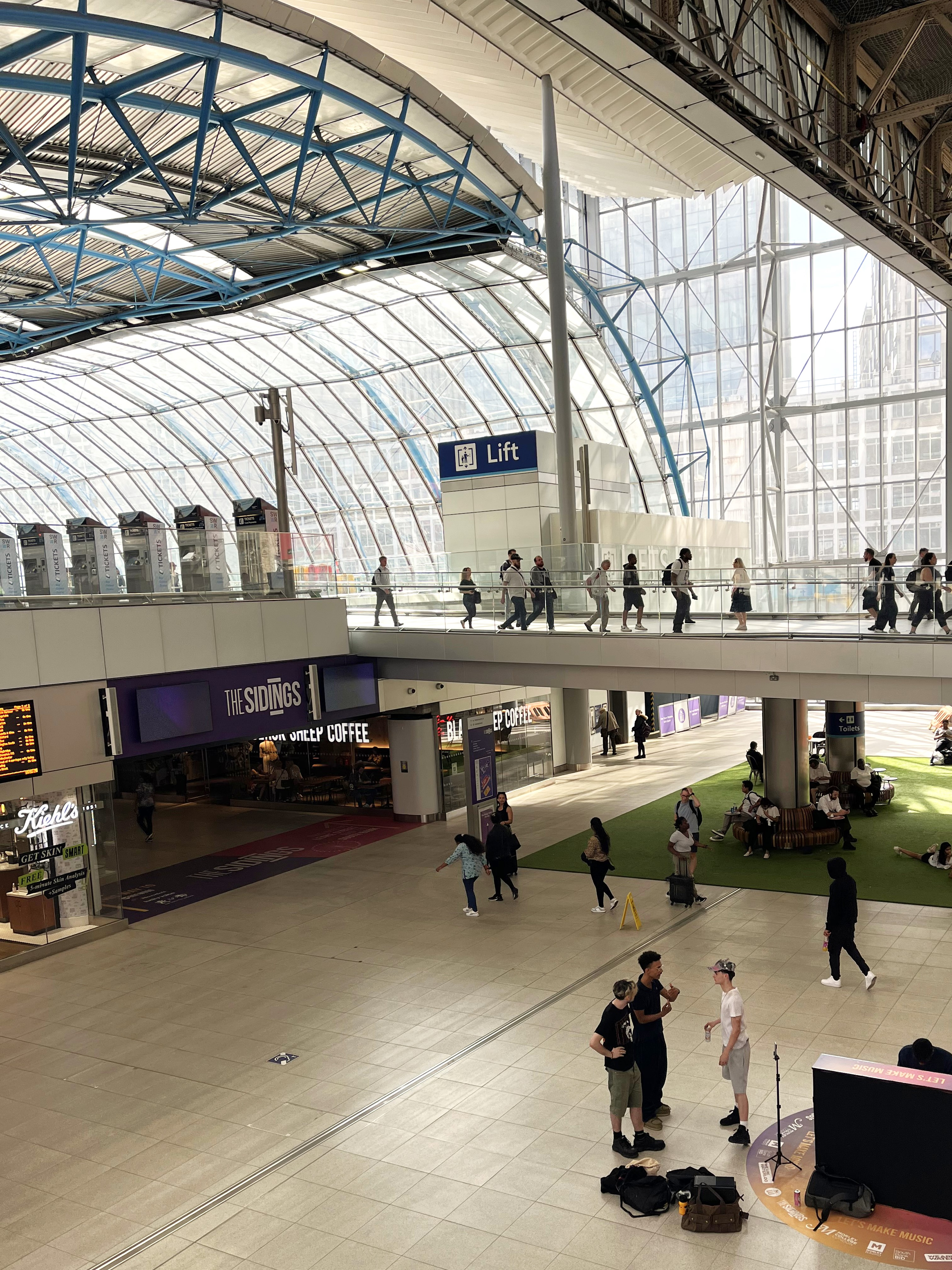
Waterloo International railway station
