= Katara Mosque =

Mosque in Doha, Qatar

- جامع كتارا
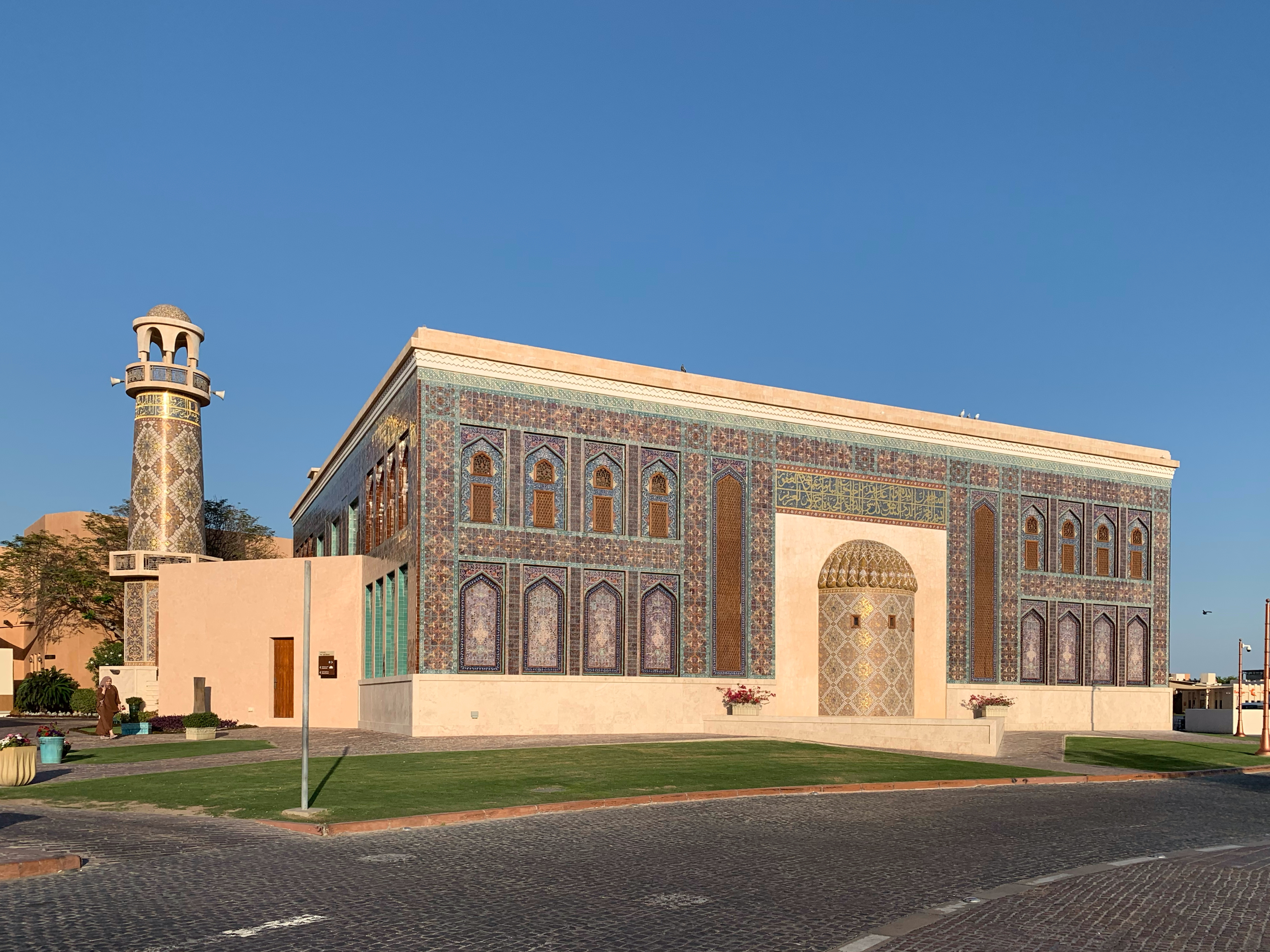
- The mosque exterior in 2023

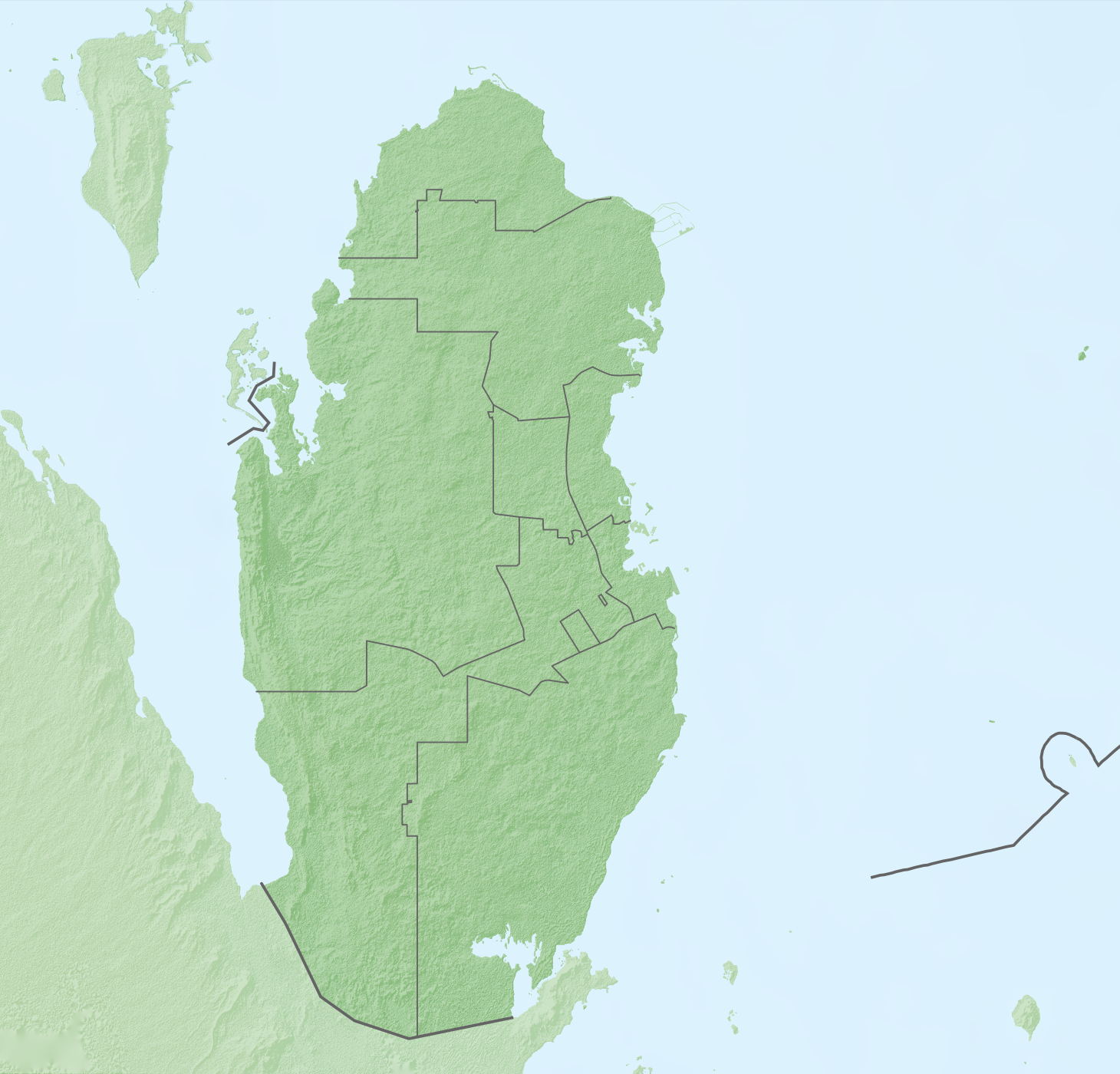
- Location of the mosque in Qatar

Religion
- Affiliation: Islam
- Ecclesiastical or organizational status: Mosque
- Status: Active

Location
- Location: Doha
- Country: Qatar
- Interactive map of Katara Mosque
- Coordinates: 25°21′33.6″N 51°31′29.2″E

Architecture
- Architect: Zainab Fadil Oglu
- Type: Mosque architecture
- Completed: 2010

Specifications
- Dome: Nine
- Minaret: One
- Materials: Mosiac tiles

The Katara Mosque (Arabic: جامع كتارا), also known as the Great Katara Mosque and the Blue Mosque, is a mosque in the Katara Cultural Village of Doha, Qatar.

The mosque was designed by Zainab Fadil Oglu, a Turkish designer. It was constructed using glittering turquoise and purple external mosaic tiles.

== See also ==
- Islam in Qatar
- List of mosques in Qatar
