= Han-na Chang =

South Korean conductor and cellist

Han-Na Chang (Korean: 장한나, born December 23, 1982) is a South Korean conductor and cellist.

== Biography ==
Born in Suwon, Gyeonggi-do, South Korea, Chang began studying piano at age 3, and cello at age 6. In 1993, her family moved to the United States, where she was enrolled in the pre-college division of the Juilliard School. In 1993, she attended Mischa Maisky's masterclasses in Siena, Italy, and continued to study with him privately. In 1994, she competed in the Fifth Rostropovich International Cello Competition, and was awarded the First Prize as well as the Contemporary Music Prize. Chang subsequently studied privately with Mstislav Rostropovich. In 1995, she made her debut recording of Tchaikovsky's Variations on a Rococo Theme and Saint-Saëns' Cello Concerto No. 1 with Rostropovich conducting the London Symphony Orchestra. In addition to studies at Juilliard, Chang majored in philosophy at Harvard University. In 2006, Gramophone Magazine (UK) named Chang a 'Classical Superstar of Tomorrow'.

Chang subsequently developed an interest in conducting, and studied with James DePreist. She made her professional conducting debut in Korea in 2007. In 2009, she founded the Absolute Classic Festival, based in Gyeonggi Province, Korea, with a focus on young musicians, and serves as its artistic director. Chang made her UK conducting debut with the Philharmonia Orchestra in January 2012, and conducted the Royal Liverpool Philharmonic for the first time in February 2012. Her musical focus has shifted to conducting, away from cello performances.

Chang first guest-conducted the Qatar Philharmonic Orchestra in June 2012. In December 2012, the orchestra named her its next music director. She led the orchestra in its first appearance at The Proms on 7 September 2014. The next day, 8 September 2014, Chang resigned the music directorship of the orchestra, with immediate effect, citing "persistent administrative difficulties and irreconcilable artistic differences with the management".

Chang became principal guest conductor of the Trondheim Symphony Orchestra as of the 2013–2014 season. In March 2016, the orchestra announced the appointment of Chang as its next chief conductor, effective with the 2017–2018 season. She is the first female conductor to be named chief conductor of the Trondheim Symphony Orchestra. In November 2018, the orchestra announced the extension of Chang's contract as chief conductor through the 2022–2023 season. Chang is scheduled to conclude her tenure as chief conductor of the Trondheim Symphony Orchestra at the close of the 2024–2025 season.

In October 2021, Chang first guest-conducted the Hamburger Symphoniker, as an emergency substitute conductor. Following the appearance, the Hamburger Symphoniker appointed Chang as its principal guest conductor (Erste Gastdirigentin), the first female conductor to be named to the post, effective with the 2022–2023 season.

On 6 April 2026, Chang was appointed head of Seoul Arts Center.

== Albums ==
- Vivaldi Cello Concertos (2008)
- Romance – Lalo Cello Concerto & other pieces (2007)
- Shostakovich Cello Concerto No. 1/ Cello Sonata (2006)
- Prokofiev Sinfonia Concertante/ Cello Sonata (2003)
- The Swan (2001)
- Haydn Cello Concerto C major and D major (1998)
- Tchaikovsky Rococo Variations/Saint-Saëns Cello Concerto No. 1 (1996)

== Sources ==
- Yoshihara, Mari (2007). Musicians from a different shore: Asians and Asian Americans in classical music. Temple University Press. ISBN 1-59213-332-0

Cultural offices
Preceded by Michalis Economou	Music Director, Qatar Philharmonic Orchestra; 2013–2014	Succeeded by (post vacant)
Preceded by Krzysztof Urbanski	Chief Conductor and Artistic Leader, Trondheim Symphony Orchestra; 2017–present	Succeeded by incumbent
