= Katara Cultural Village =

Cultural and commercial complex in Doha, Qatar

Coordinates: 25.3603257°N 51.5263631°E

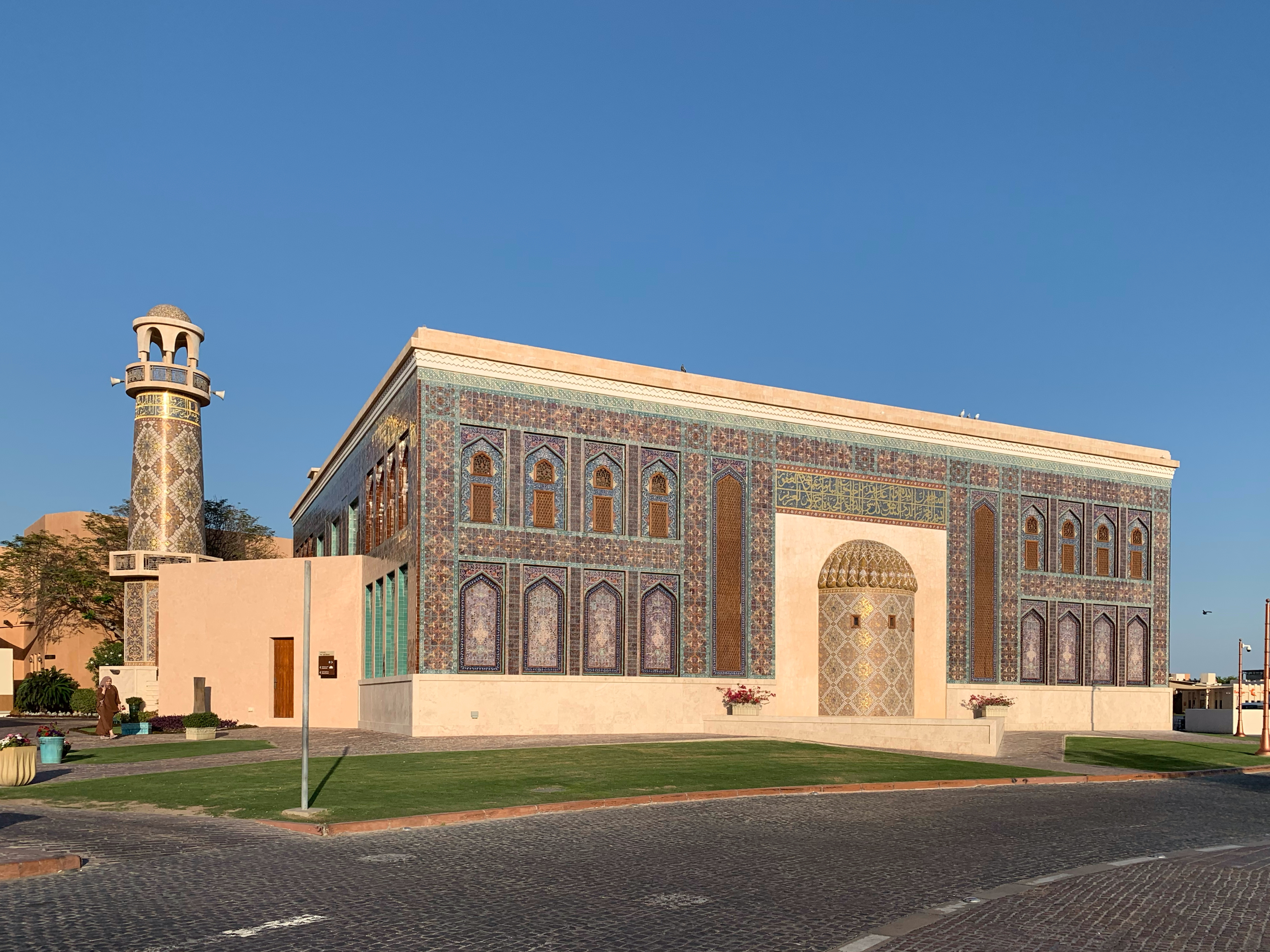
Katara Mosque

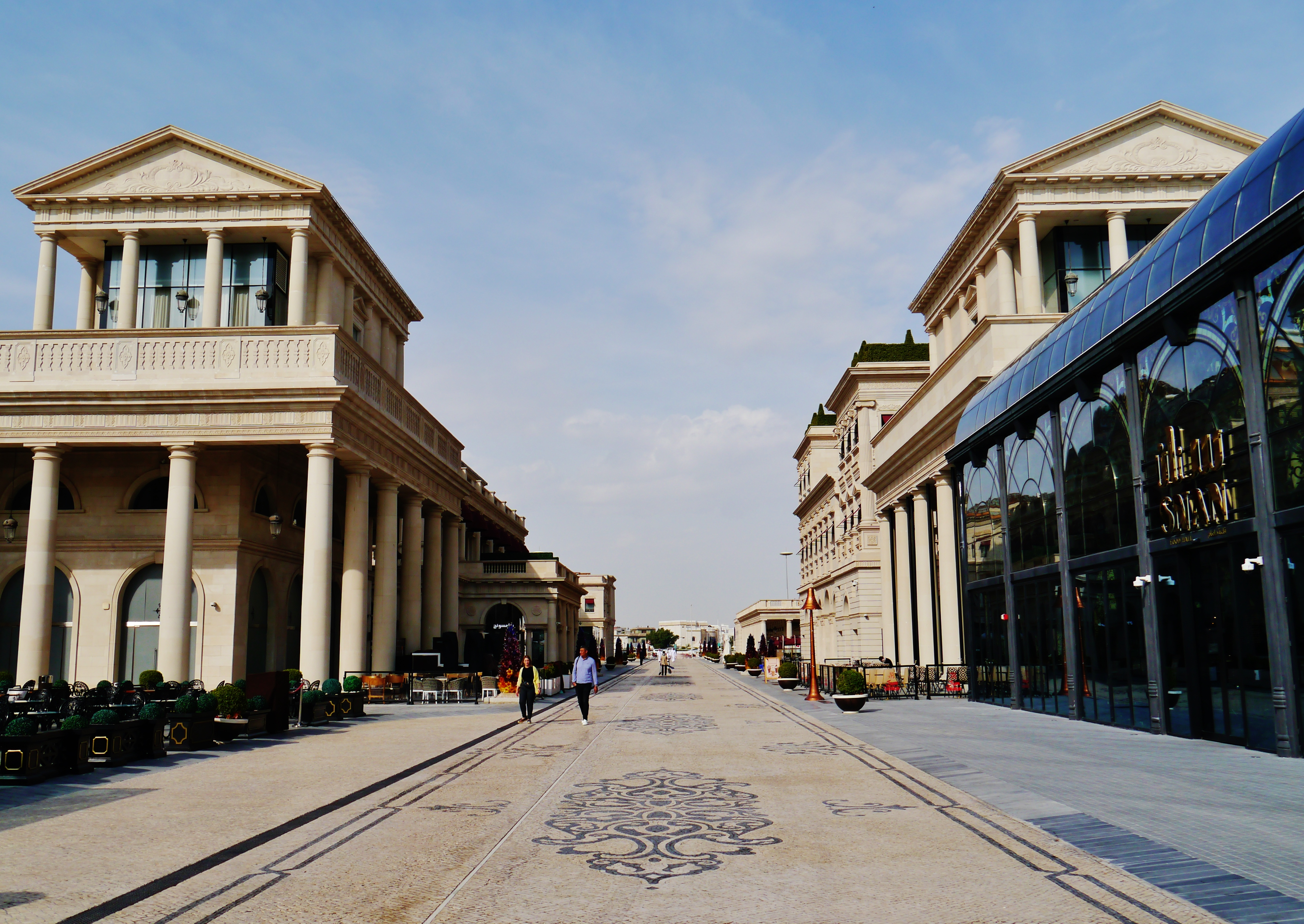
Central plaza

Katara Cultural Village (Arabic: الحي الثقافي كتارا), also known simply as Katara (Arabic: كتارا), is a cultural and commercial complex in Doha, Qatar, located on the eastern coast between West Bay and the Pearl.

It was soft-opened in October 2010 during the Doha Tribeca Film Festival.

== Overview ==
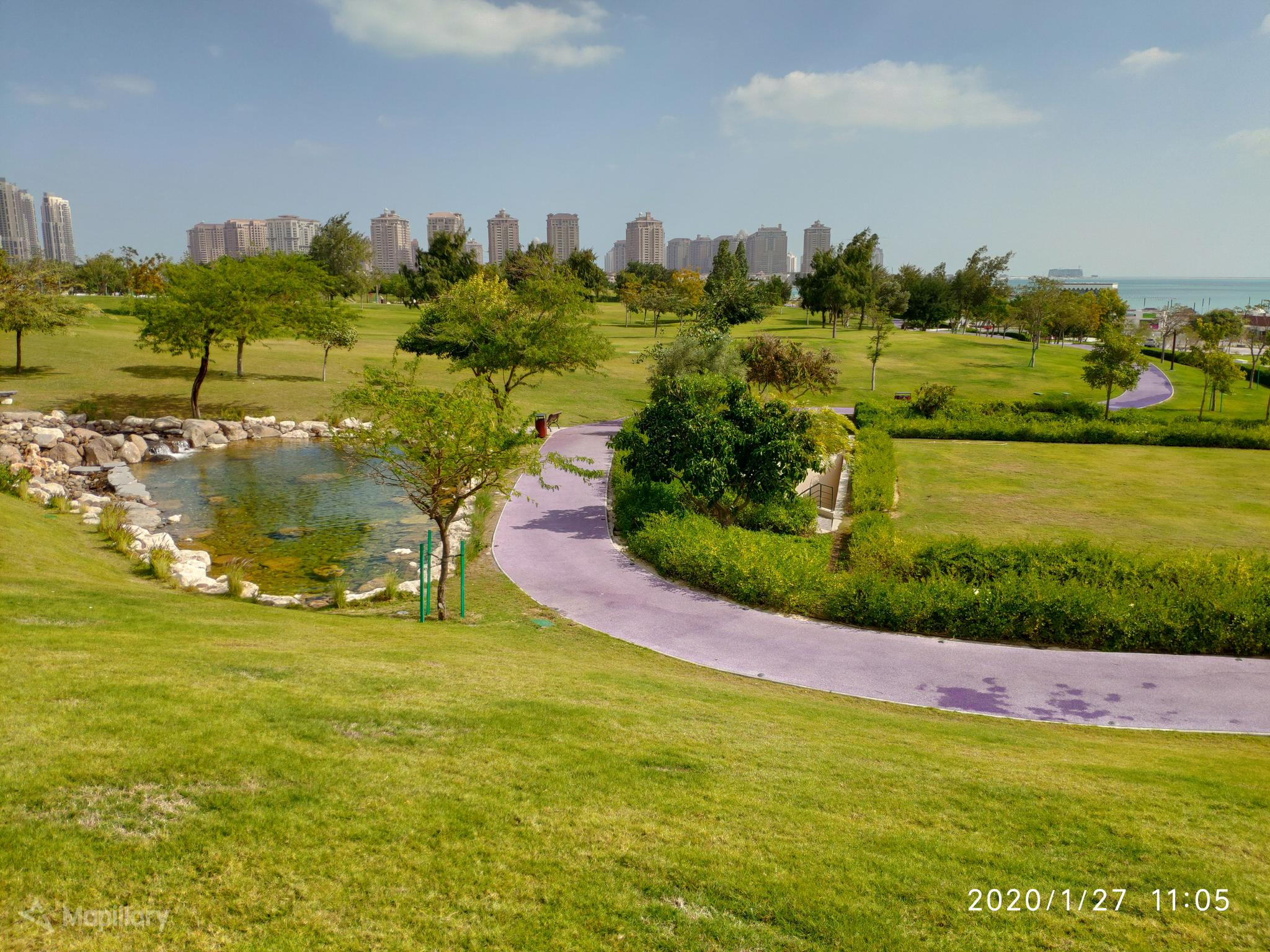
Walking path in Katara Hills

Katara Cultural Village was established in 2010 on reclaimed land along Doha's coastline to host arts and cultural events and venues. Designed to resemble a traditional Qatari village, it features low, sand-colored buildings with flat roofs, shaded alleys, and courtyards, alongside contemporary facilities. Its location between West Bay and the Pearl positions it within one of the capital's most prominent waterfront areas.

The complex contains a variety of venues including art galleries, theatres, concert halls, libraries, a multi-purpose cinema, and a multi-purpose conference hall, which host performances and festivals throughout the year. Outdoor features include the 1.5 kilometres (0.93 mi)-long Katara Beach, offering activities such as swimming, pedal boating, and kayaking, as well as a promenade lined with public art. Two parks are found in Katara: the North Hills Park and the South Hills Park, both located on Katara Hills, an artificial hill featuring lush vegetation, a water stream, and walking trails.

Katara's landmarks include a 3,275-square-metre marble amphitheatre, blending ancient Greek and traditional Arabic design elements, which can seat up to 5,000 spectators. The complex is also home to the Ottoman-style Golden Mosque, adorned with gold tiles, and the Katara Mosque, designed by Turkish architect Zainab Fadil Oglu and decorated with turquoise and purple mosaics. Traditional pigeon towers, constructed of brick and clay and measuring 15 metres (49 ft) in height, are another distinctive feature. The Opera House, seating 550, is the only venue of its type in Qatar and hosts concerts and cultural events.

A museum showcasing the country's maritime heritage was opened in November 2015. It is also the site of Al Bahie Auction House. It includes a 38,000 m^{2} (3.8 ha) open-air shopping mall equipped with outdoor air conditioning, named 21 High St ("Katara Plaza" during development). The complex is host to a variety of different exhibitions, festivals, workshops, lectures, concerts and religious activities.

== Cultural organizations ==
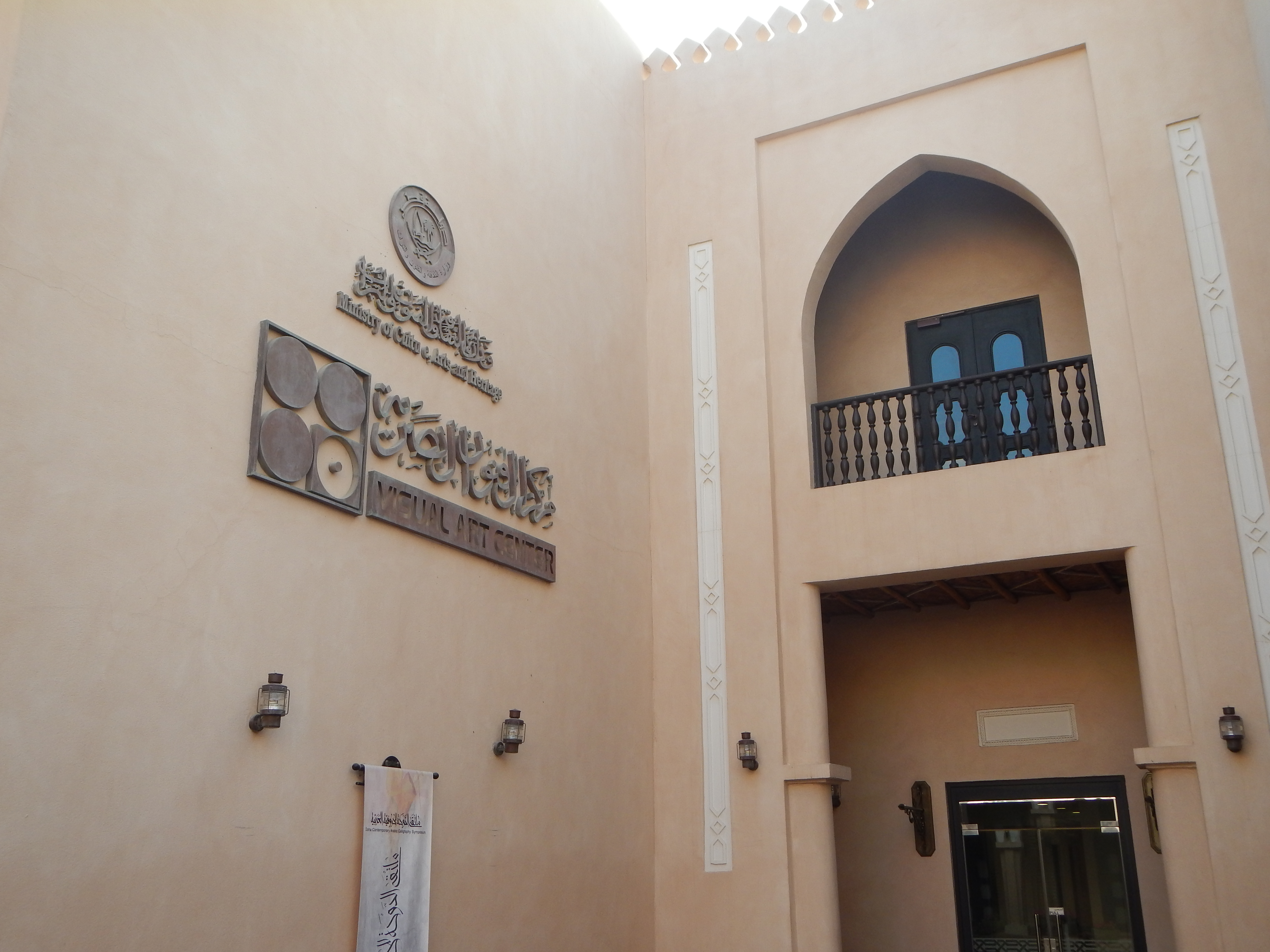
Visual Art Center in Katara

Katara hosts the following cultural organizations:

- Al Gannas Association, an organization for hunting and falconry.
- Al Bahie Auction House, dedicating to auctioning works of art.
- Arab Postal Stamp Museum, a museum covering the postal history of 22 countries.
- Bedaya Center, a career center dedicating to helping young Qataris find employment.
- Brooq Magazine, a monthly cultural magazine established in 2003.
- Doha Film Institute, a film production company that promotes local and regional filmmakers.
- Forum of Arabic and International Relations, a cultural organization formed to promote intraregional relations and dialogue.
- Katara Art Center, an art center founded in 2012.
- Katara Art Studios, an organization that holds art workshops and organizes local art-related events.
- Katara Beach Club, a sports and wellness club.
- Katara Planetarium, a planetarium which has a capacity for 200 viewers and boasts a 22-meter display.
- Poet Majles, a center dedicated to Arabic poetry.
- Qatar Fine Arts Association, one the oldest artist societies in the country.
- Qatar Music Academy, a government-sanctioned academy that trains students in music.
- Qatar Philharmonic Orchestra, an orchestra that performs both western and Arabic music.
- Qatar Museums Gallery-Katara.
- Sout Al Khaleej, an Arabic-language public radio station.
- Visual Art Center, which showcases the work of local artists and holds educational workshops.
- Youth Hobbies Center, a youth center that holds workshops on activities such as photography, stamp collecting, animation and video games.

== Cultural awards ==
Launched in 2014, Katara Prize for Arabic Novel is an annual award organized by Katara that celebrates distinguished Arab novelists. It has a total prize pool of $650,000 and a main prize of $200,000, making it one of the richest literary prizes in the world. The prize aims to consolidate the presence of distinguished Arab novels on the global stage. The 2020 edition saw the launch of the magazine Sardiyat, the first international peer-reviewed magazine issued by Katara. Additionally, four periodical books specialised in novels were inaugurated in 2020.

== Events ==
=== Fath Al Kheir ===
Fath Al Kheir journey is a voyage organized by Katara management to promote Qatar's maritime heritage. The first voyage took place in the Persian Gulf from 22 November to 18 December, 2013. A second voyage was launched on 6 October 2015. The ship was crewed by 40 Qataris in traditional attire and sailed around the Arabian Sea, with the key destinations being Oman and India. The Indian ambassador to Qatar hailed it as a milestone in the countries' bilateral relations.

=== Traditional Dhow Festival ===
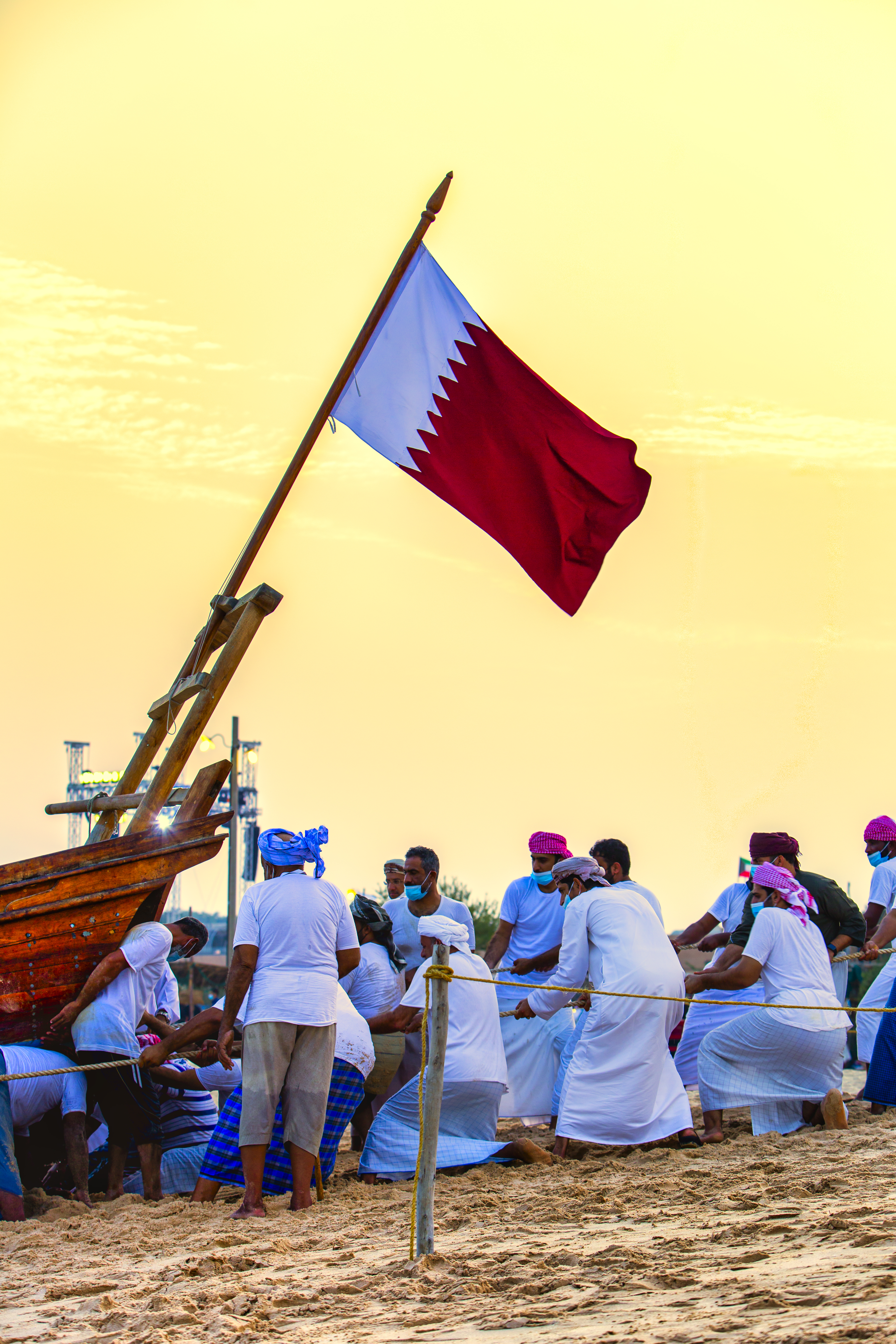
The 2020 edition of the Traditional Dhow Festival

The Traditional Dhow Festival has been held annually at Katara Cultural Village since its inauguration in 2010. The event involves the participation of several other countries. The program typically includes maritime art performances, operas marking historic dhow voyages such as the Fath Al Khair journey, traditional Gulf music, and demonstrations of regional marine arts. Visitors can attend cultural symposia on pearl diving, navigation, and seafaring traditions, as well as workshops in boatbuilding, fishing gear, and other crafts. There are also interactive displays on natural pearl harvesting.

=== Katara Art Forum ===
A two-day discussion forum for the arts was inaugurated in Katara in 2014. An annual event, the forum features international and local researchers who deliver speeches on topics such as the history of Arab art and Arab art groups.

=== Aida ===
In October 2012, an event featuring Giuseppe Verdi's classic opera Aida was hosted in Katara's amphitheatre. It was the first opera to be held in Qatar. The Qatar Philharmonic Orchestra were featured in the opera, alongside at least 80 singers and 35 actors.

=== 2021 FIFA Arab Cup Draw ===
The group stage draw for the 2021 FIFA Arab Cup took place on 27 April 2021 at the Katara's opera house.

=== UK Festival ===
The UK Festival was held in parts at the Katara Cultural Village since their 5th edition in 2020. In 2022 the Village also signed an agreement with the organiser British Council Qatar to cooperate on future events.

=== S'hail ===
The S'hail falcon exhibition is one of largest exhibitions for falconry and hunting and has been held at the Katara Cultural Village since 2017. The festivals featured falcons from local and international breeders, as well as veterinary clinics, booths for falcon-related goods and events like the simulated air gun event.

=== X Series 19 – Qatar: The Supercard ===
The open workouts and weigh-ins for the MF & DAZN: X Series 19 – Qatar: The Supercard bout in Doha was held at the amphitheater on 26 and 27 November 2024.

=== Qatar International Art Festival ===
The Qatar International Art Festival was first held at Katara in 2019, after the first edition took place at the Doha Fire Station a year prior. Since then it has been held at Katara in 2021, 2022, 2024, and 2025.

=== Arab Opera Festival ===
In December 2025, Katara hosted the first Arab Opera Festival, after being designated as the Arab Opera City by the ALESCO. A total of 15 countries participated in the festival.

=== Katara European Jazz Festival ===
Starting in 2014, Katara has been hosting the Katara European Jazz Festival nearly every year. The first festival was organised together with the embassies of Italy, Austria, Switzerland, Germany and France and featured concerts as well as workshops.

=== Doha Tattoo ===
Katara hosted the first Doha International Music and Marching Festival, known as Doha Tattoo, in December 2025. The event featured Qatari and international military bands and marching ensembles.

=== Katara International Amber Exhibition ===
Since 2019, Katara hosts the Katara International Amber Exhibition. The second exhibition in 2020 featured over 90 stalls from 13 participating countries.

=== Katara International Arabian Horse Festival ===
The Katara International Arabian Horse Festival is a equestrian event first hosted at Katara in 2021. It was organised together with the Qatar Equestrian Federation and the Qatar Racing and Equestrian Club. The event included the Title Show Championship as well as art exhibitions.

== Transport ==
Katara can be reached on the Red Line of the Doha Metro through Katara station. The station was opened to the public on 10 December 2019 along with three other Red Line stations, over six months after the opening of the line's first 13 stations. Facilities in the station include a prayer room and restrooms.

=== Development projects ===
Doha Bay crossing (also known as Sharq Crossing) is a causeway between 600 m and 1,300 m which will link Hamad International Airport with Katara. It was originally set for completion by 2021.

== Management ==
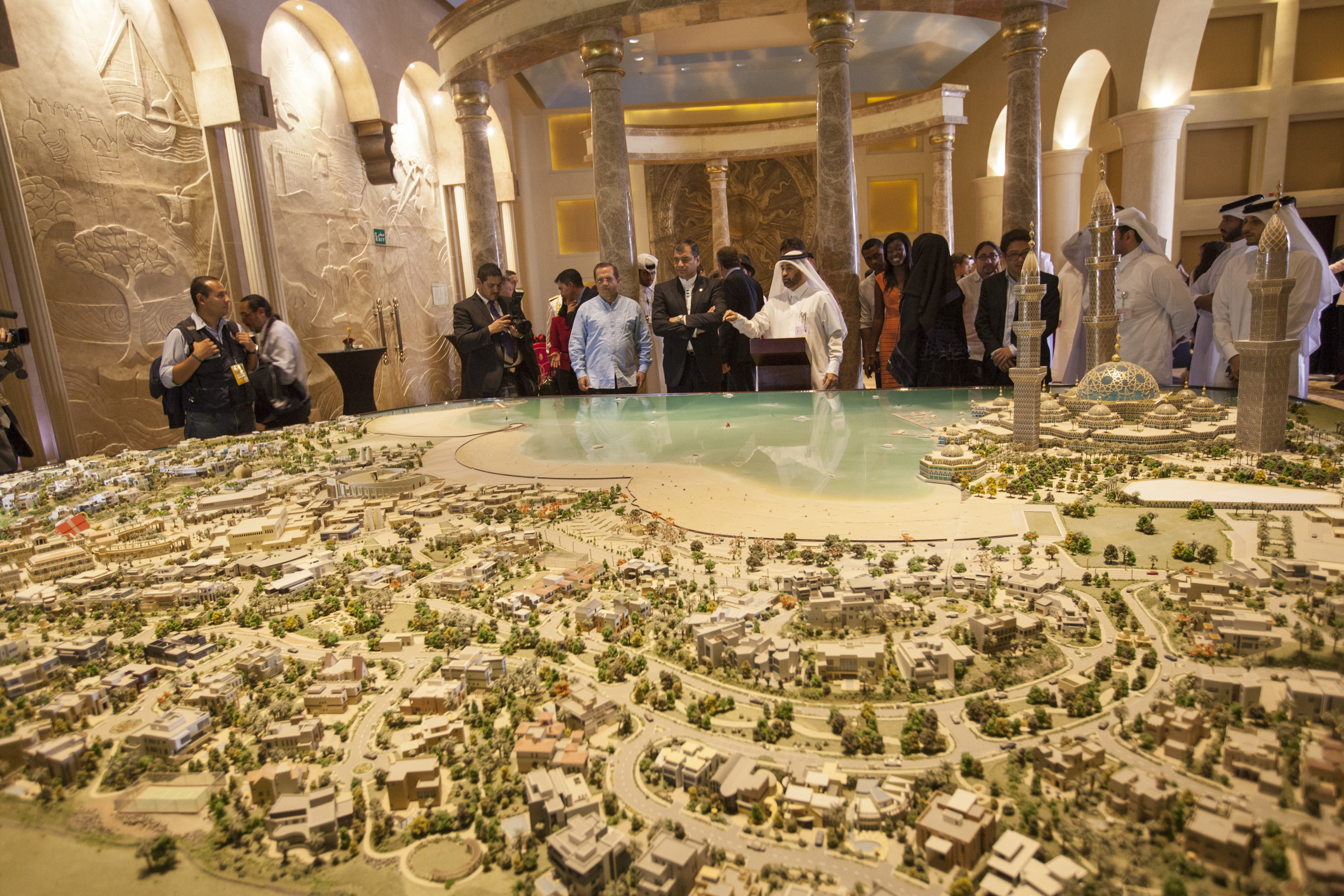
A scale model of Katara.

Dr. Khalid bin Ibrahim Al-Sulaiti has been the General Manager of Katara since 2012.

== Gallery ==
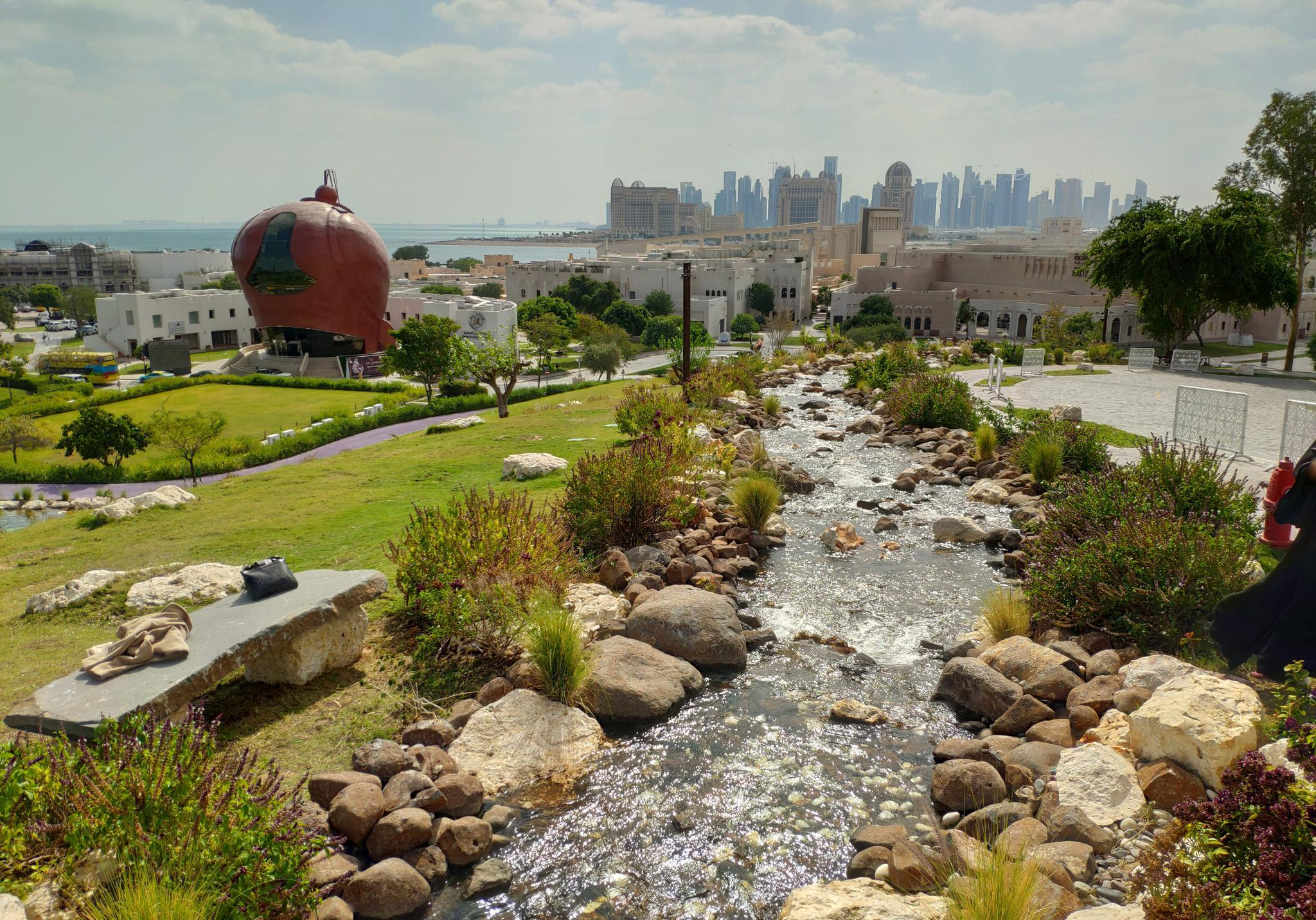
Overhead view of buildings at Katara cultural village.

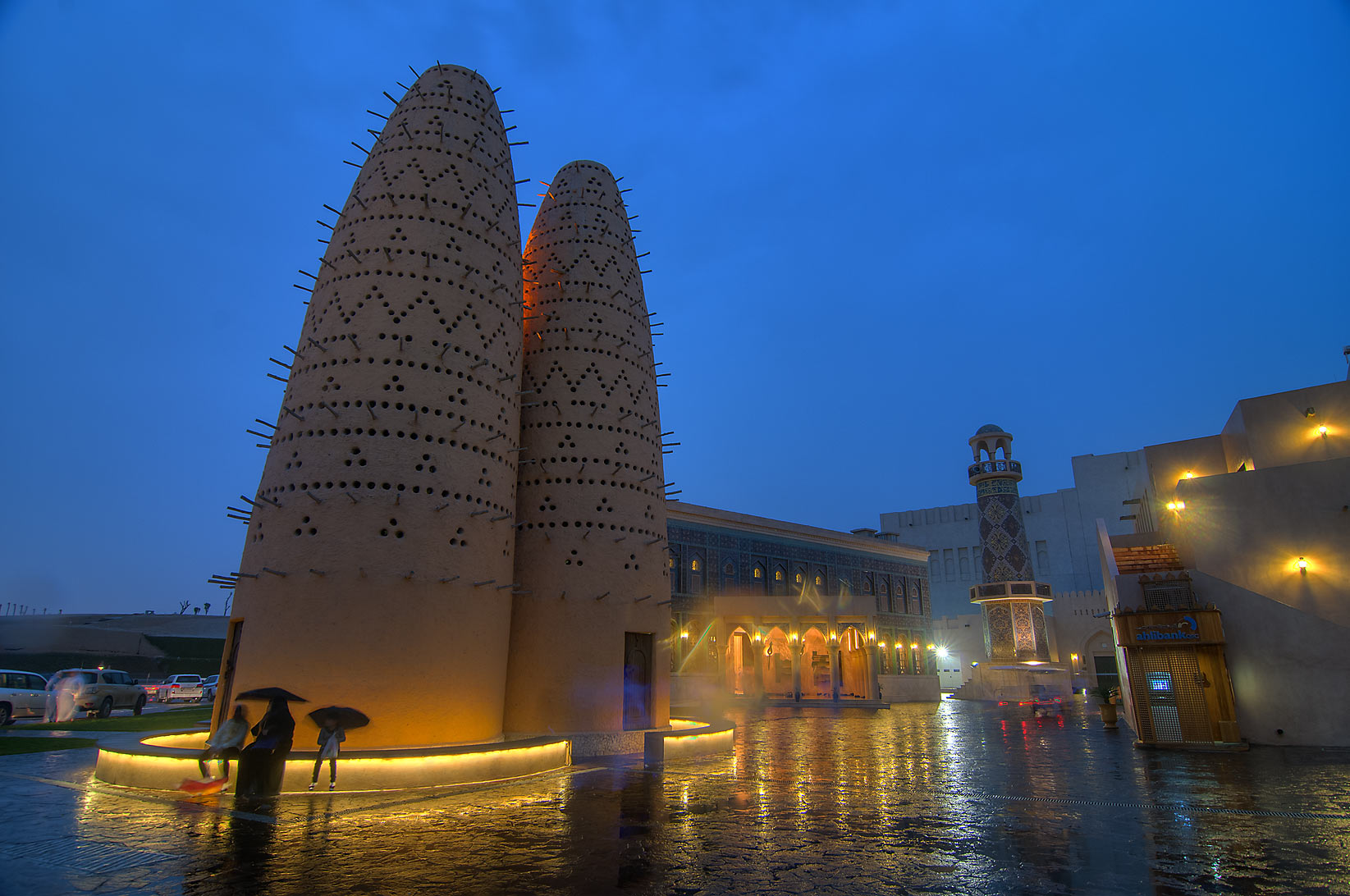
A pair of dovecotes in Katara.

Katara Towers in Lusail City.

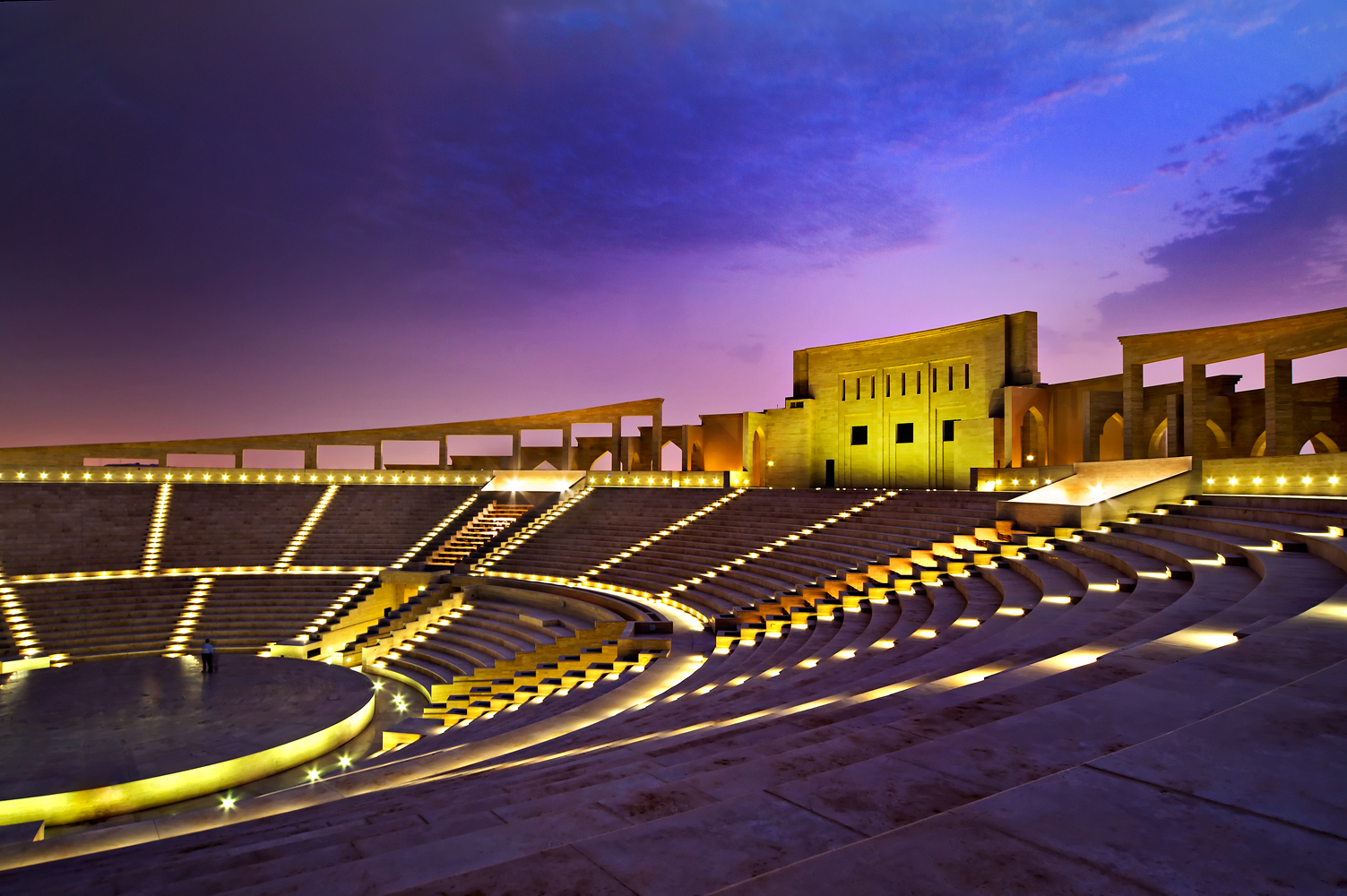
The amphitheater in Katara.
