= Education City Mosque =

Mosque in Al Rayyan, Qatar

- مسجد المدينة التعليمية
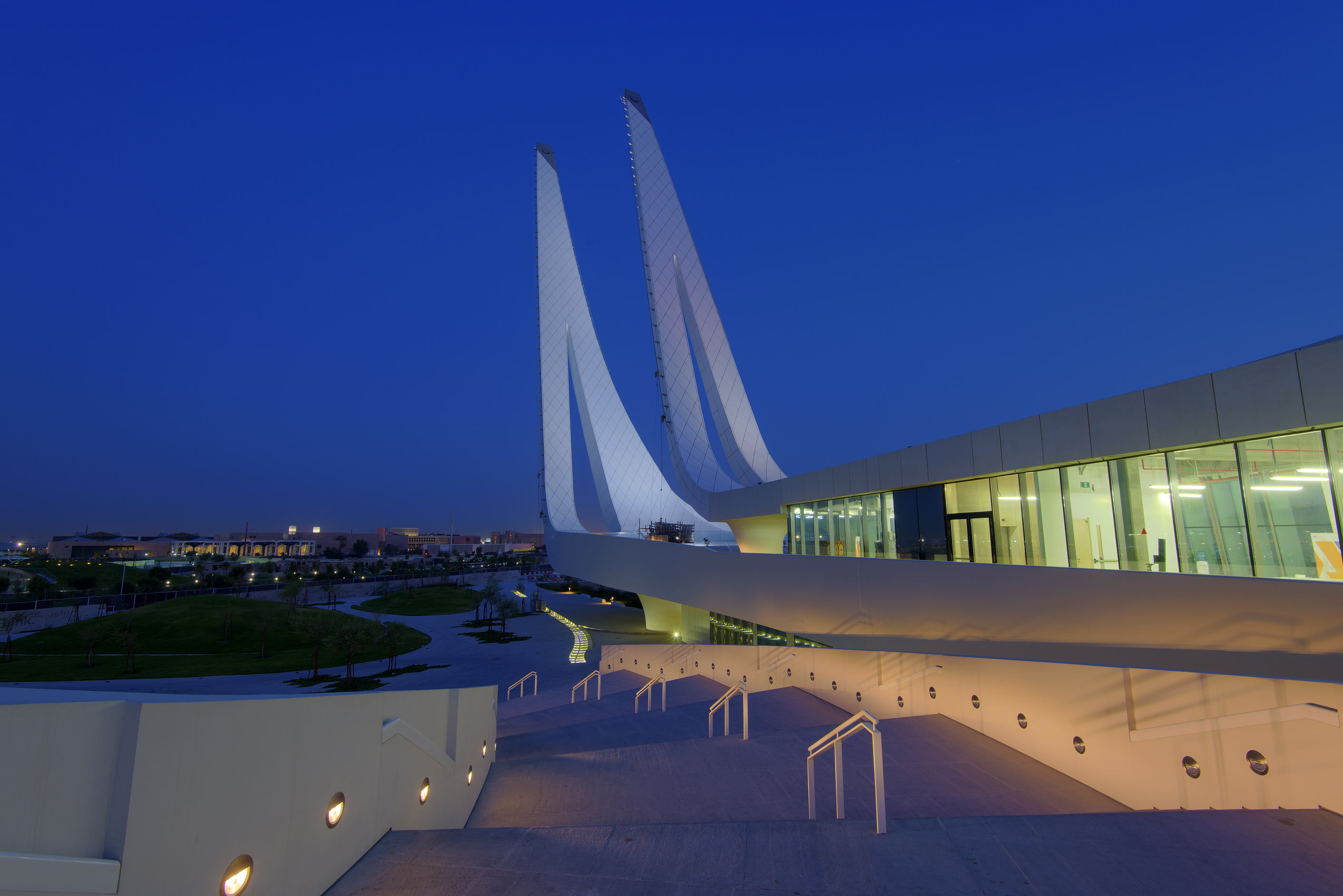
- The twin minarets and grand staircase

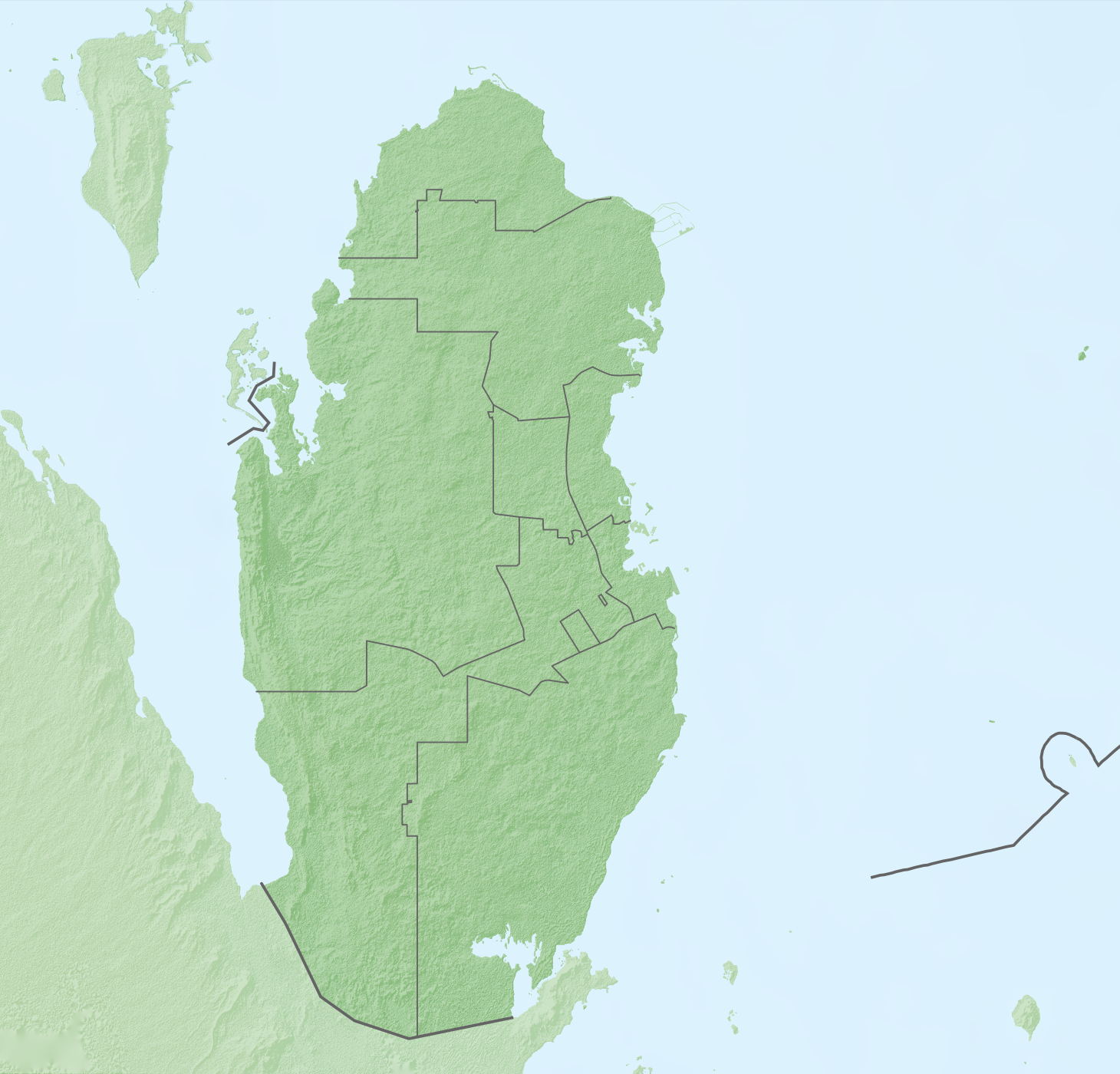
- Location of the mosque in Qatar

Religion
- Affiliation: Islam
- Ecclesiastical or organizational status: Mosque
- Ownership: Qatar Foundation
- Status: Active

Location
- Location: Hamad Bin Khalifa University, Education City, Al Rayyan
- Country: Qatar
- Interactive map of Education City Mosque
- Coordinates: 25°19′02″N 51°26′49″E

Architecture
- Architect: Mangera Yvars (MYAA)
- Type: Mosque architecture
- Style: Modern Qatari
- Completed: 2013

Specifications
- Capacity: 2,800 worshippers
- Dome: Ninety
- Minaret: Two
- Minaret height: 90 m (300 ft)
- Materials: Sandstone; steel

Website
- qf.org.qa

The Education City Mosque (Arabic: مسجد المدينة التعليمية), also known as the QFIS Mosque, is the national mosque of Education City Al Rayyan in Qatar. The mosque forms part of Qatar Faculty of Islamic Studies (QFIS), located in the Minaretein building, on the campus of the Hamad Bin Khalifa University. Also included in the building is teaching and faculty space and a research centre for the QFIS.

== Architecture ==
Designed by the architectural team of Mangera Yvars and completed in 2013, the QFIS Minaretein building rests on five large columns representing the five pillars of Islam, with each featuring a verse drawn from the Qur'an. The QFIS is based on the idea of the Islamic kulliyya, suggesting that all knowledge comes from faith, explored the infinite spiral form of the building plan and the pathways which link the teaching and learning spaces to the mosque, separated symbolically by a four-storey ablution cascade under the mosque, that helps to keep the mosque cool.

The building won the 2015 Best Religious Building prize at the World Architecture Festival; and in the following year it was nominated by the Royal Institute of British Architects for its inaugural international prize. It has also won several sustainability awards.

== Gallery ==
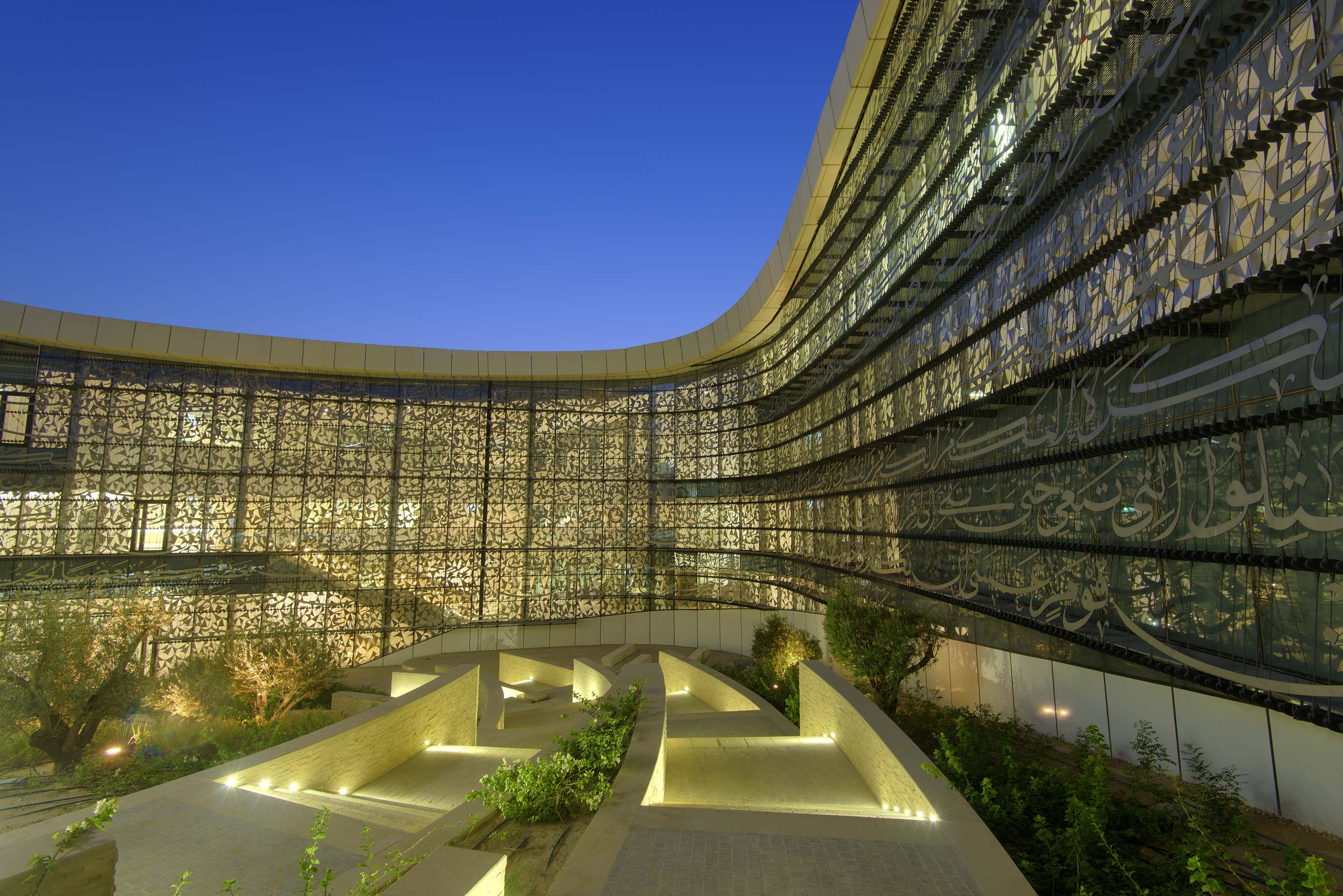
Staircase in the courtyard

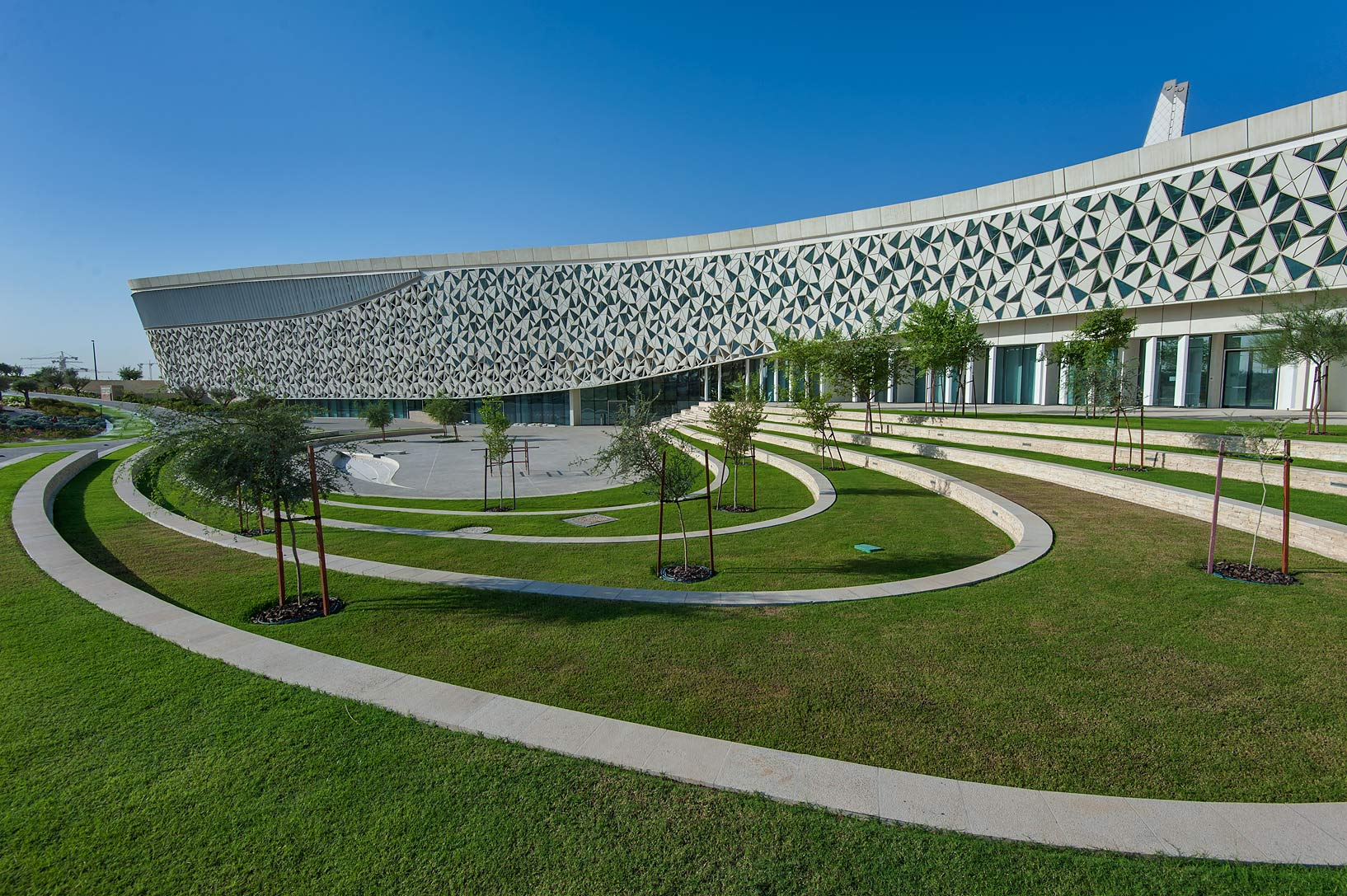
Courtyard lawn

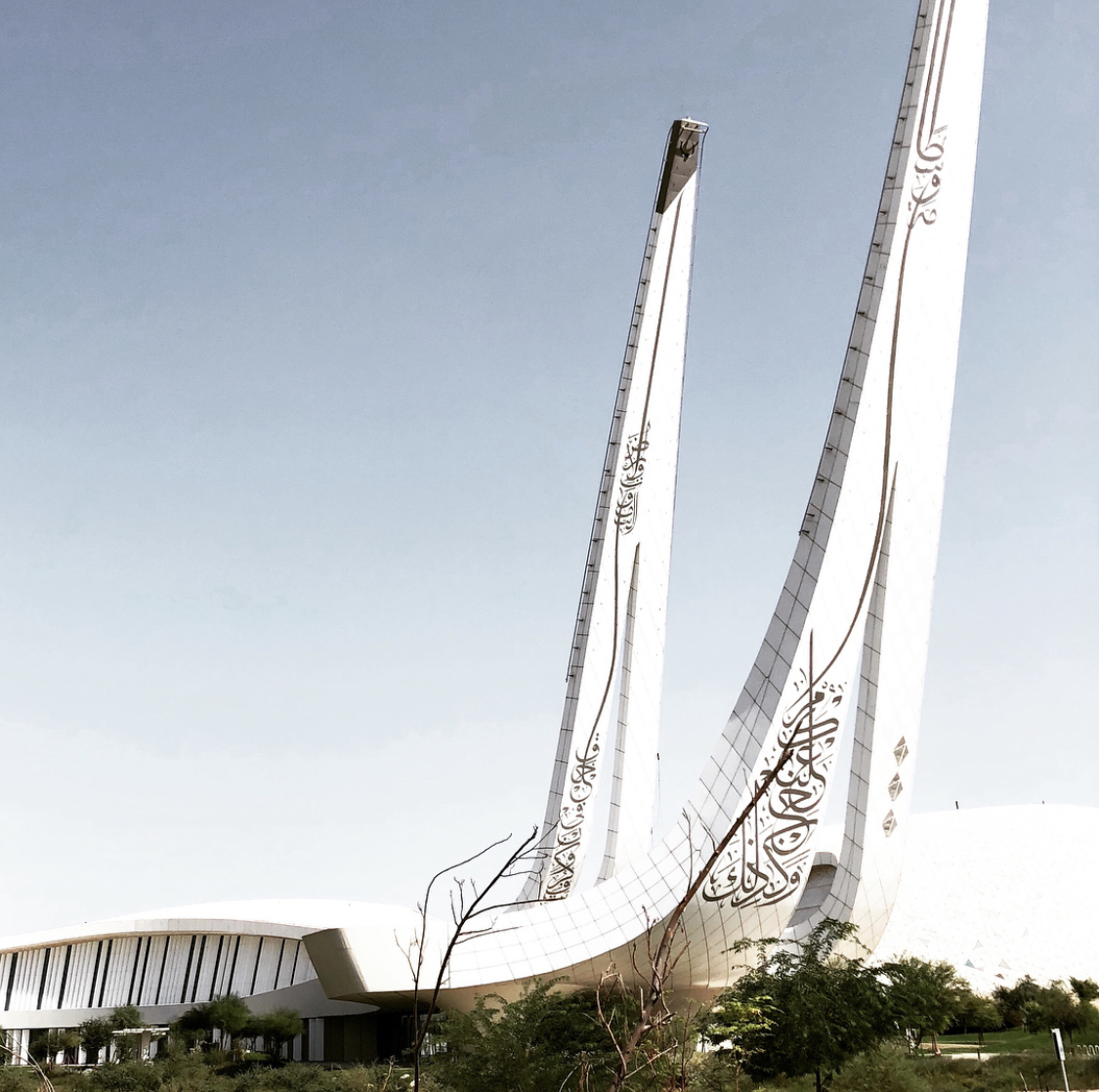
The distinctive twin minarets

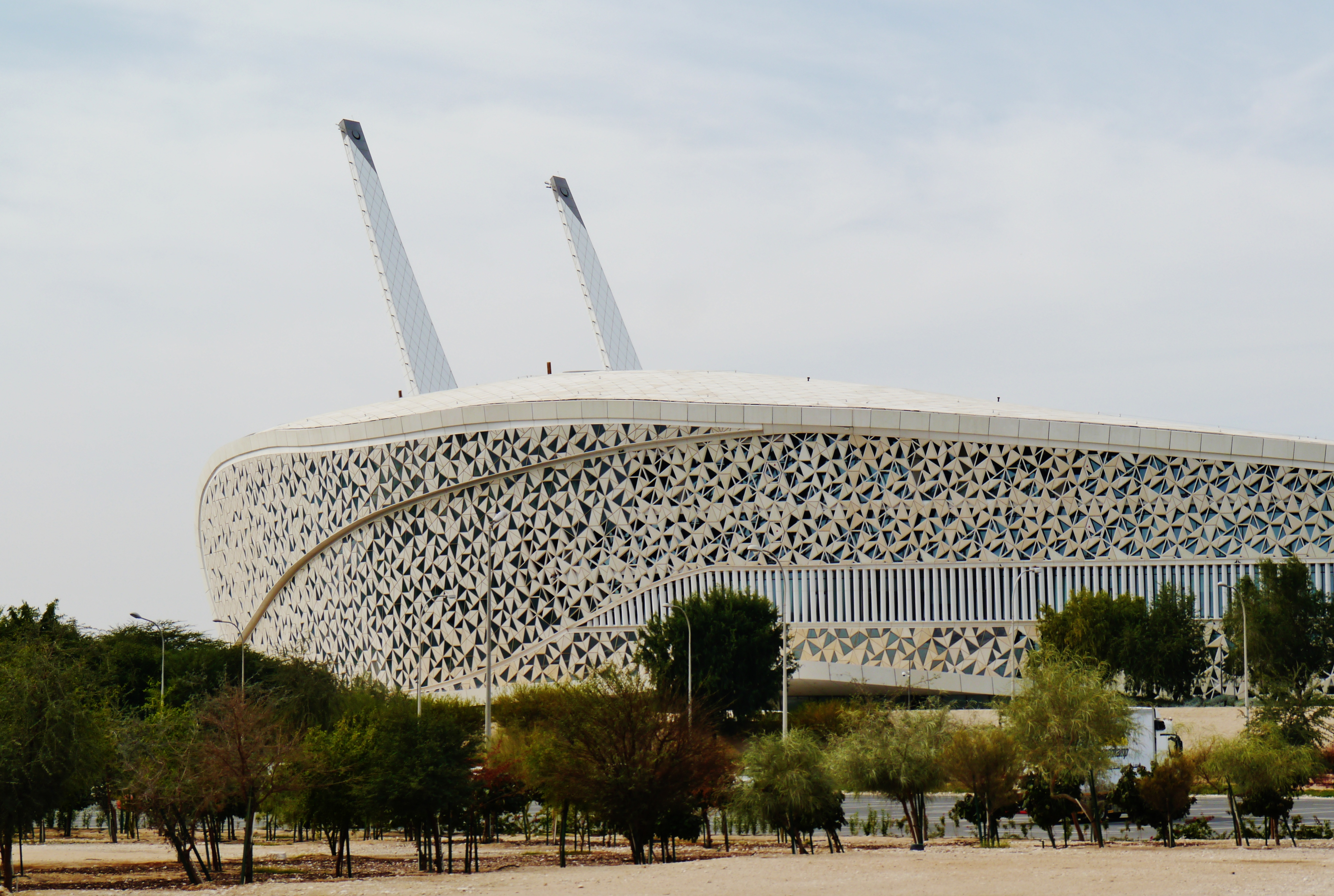
Mosque exterior

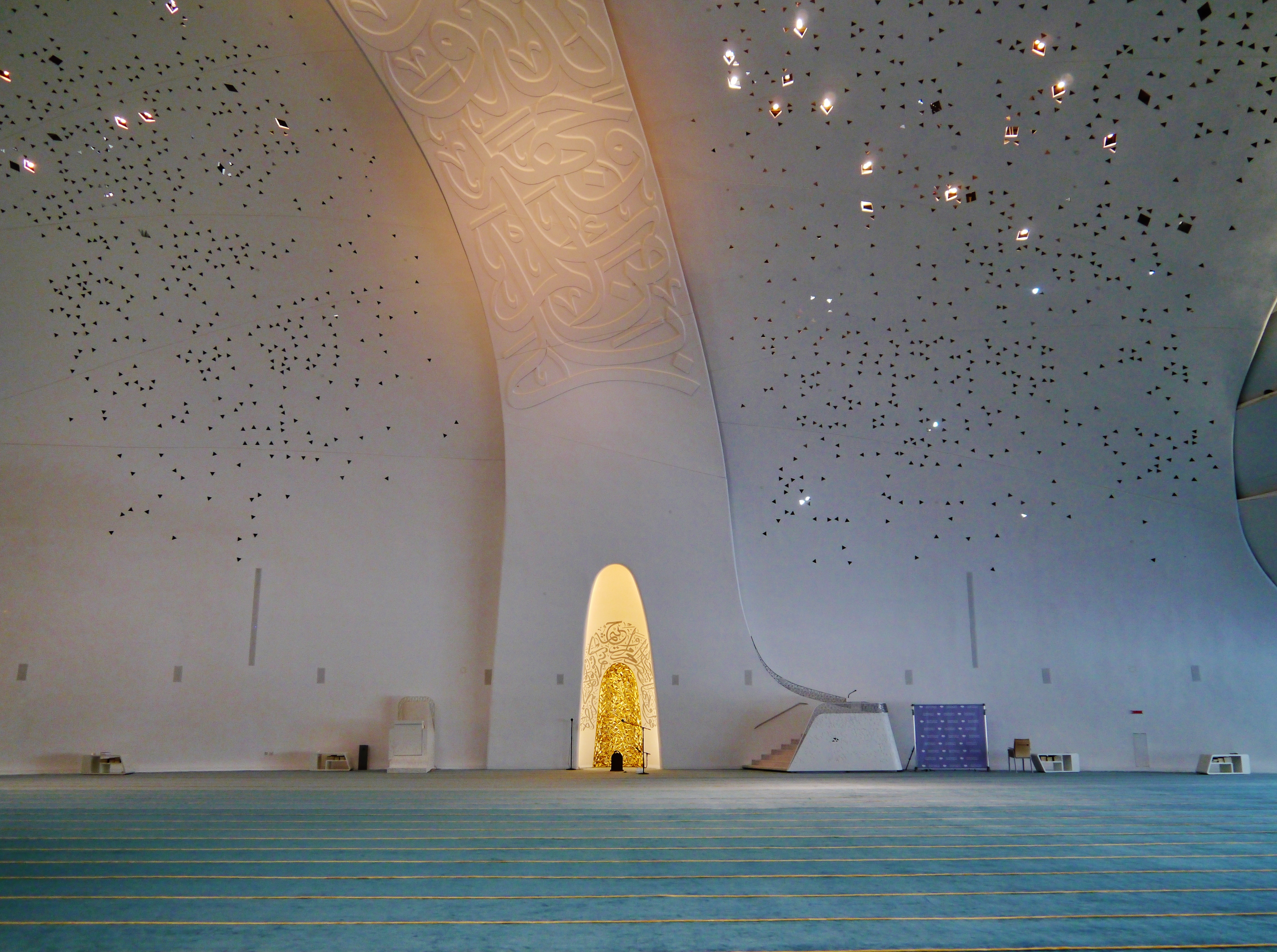
Mosque interior

== See also ==
- Islam in Qatar
- List of mosques in Qatar
