= Doha Festival City =

- دوحة فستيفال سيتي
- Location: Umm Salal, Doha, Qatar
- Coordinates: 25.3850°N 51.4422°E
- Opened: 5 April 2017; 9 years ago
- Owner: Al Futtaim Real Estate
- Num. of stores: 500+
- Floor area: 250,000 square metres (2,700,000 ft^{2})
- Floors: 2
- Public transit: M145, R701 Doha Festival City stop and Wadi Al Askar st. stop
- Website: Doha Festival City website

Doha Festival City is a large Emarati-owned shopping mall and entertainment complex located in Umm Salal, north of Doha, Qatar, along Al Shamal Road. It is one of the largest retail developments in Qatar, featuring over 500 stores, 100 dining establishments, and extensive leisure attractions. The project was developed at an estimated cost of QR 6 billion by Bawabat Al-Shamal Real Estate Company (Basrec), a joint venture owned by Dubai-based Al-Futtaim Real Estate Services, and a private Qatari investor.

== History ==
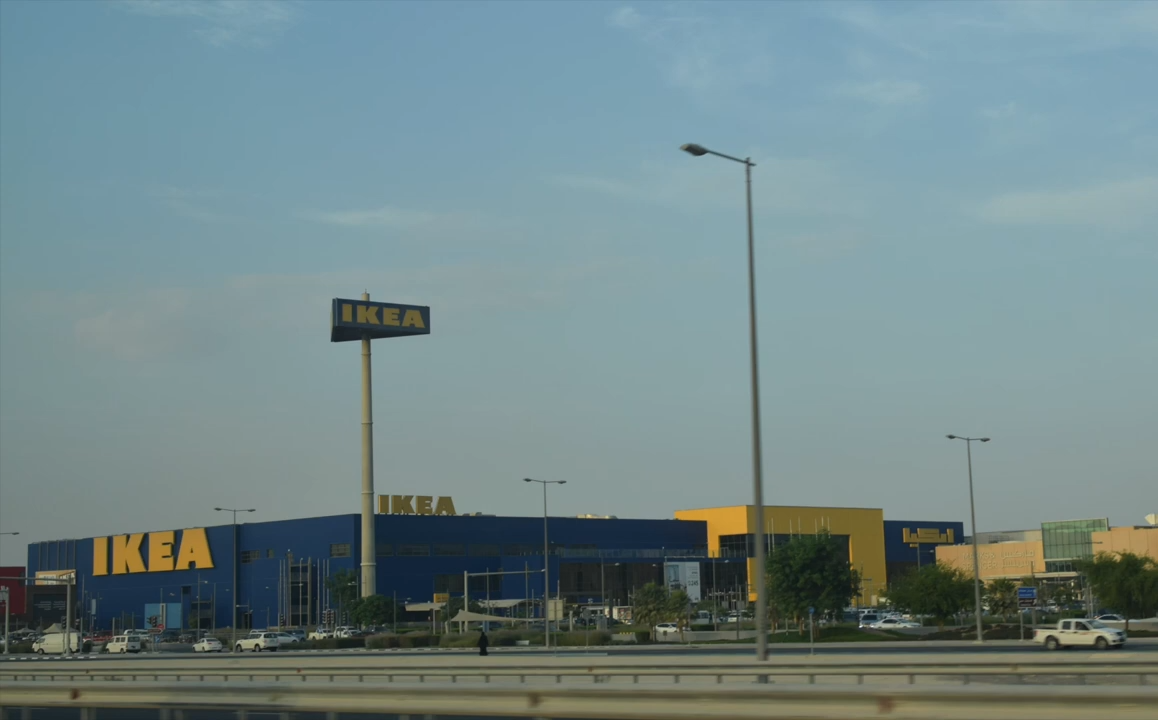
IKEA store which was opened in 2013.

The Doha Festival City project was announced in the early 2010s as a major mixed-use development. Construction began in 2011 on a 433,000 m^{2} site, and the initial phase opened in March 2013 with Qatar's first IKEA store, spanning 32,000 m^{2}.

The second and larger phase, which included the main shopping mall, was completed in 2017. A soft opening took place on April 5, 2017, and at that time it became the largest mall of Qatar. The official grand opening occurred in November 2018, which included a VIP gala and a concert by American pop singer Jennifer Lopez.

Following the mall's opening, leisure attractions developed by the now defunct company Trimoo were opened in stages. The first was Virtuocity, an e-sports and virtual-reality center, followed by Angry Birds World, created with Finland's Rovio Entertainment and Vox Cinemas. The indoor portion opened in mid-2018, and outdoor attractions followed in April 2019. Snow Dunes, Qatar's first indoor snow-themed park, debuted in August 2019.

From September to November 2024, Doha Festival City partnered with Harper's Bazaar to host a series of fashion and beauty events. The series included 'Emerging Voices,' an event held in collaboration with VCUarts Qatar, M7, and Scale 7, which featured the work of local creatives. It also included Front Row Live, a three-day event comprising masterclasses, runway shows, and panel discussions. Participants included Mona Kattan, founder of Kayali, and Israeli fashion personality Leonie Hanne.

The mall also hosted Doha Festival City RunFest 2026 on Friday, September 25 2026, Inside the mall in partnership with Qatar Sports For All Federation (QSFA). The indoor running event featured different lengths of races: 5km, 10km, a 1km Fun Run, and a 500m Mini Kids Run, welcoming participants of all ages and fitness levels. the event also included live entertainment and activities for visitors.

== Facilities ==
Doha Festival City map
1 IKEA Qatar
2 Monoprix Hypermarket
3 South Food Court
4 North Food Court
5 Snow Dunes
6 Angry Birds World Park

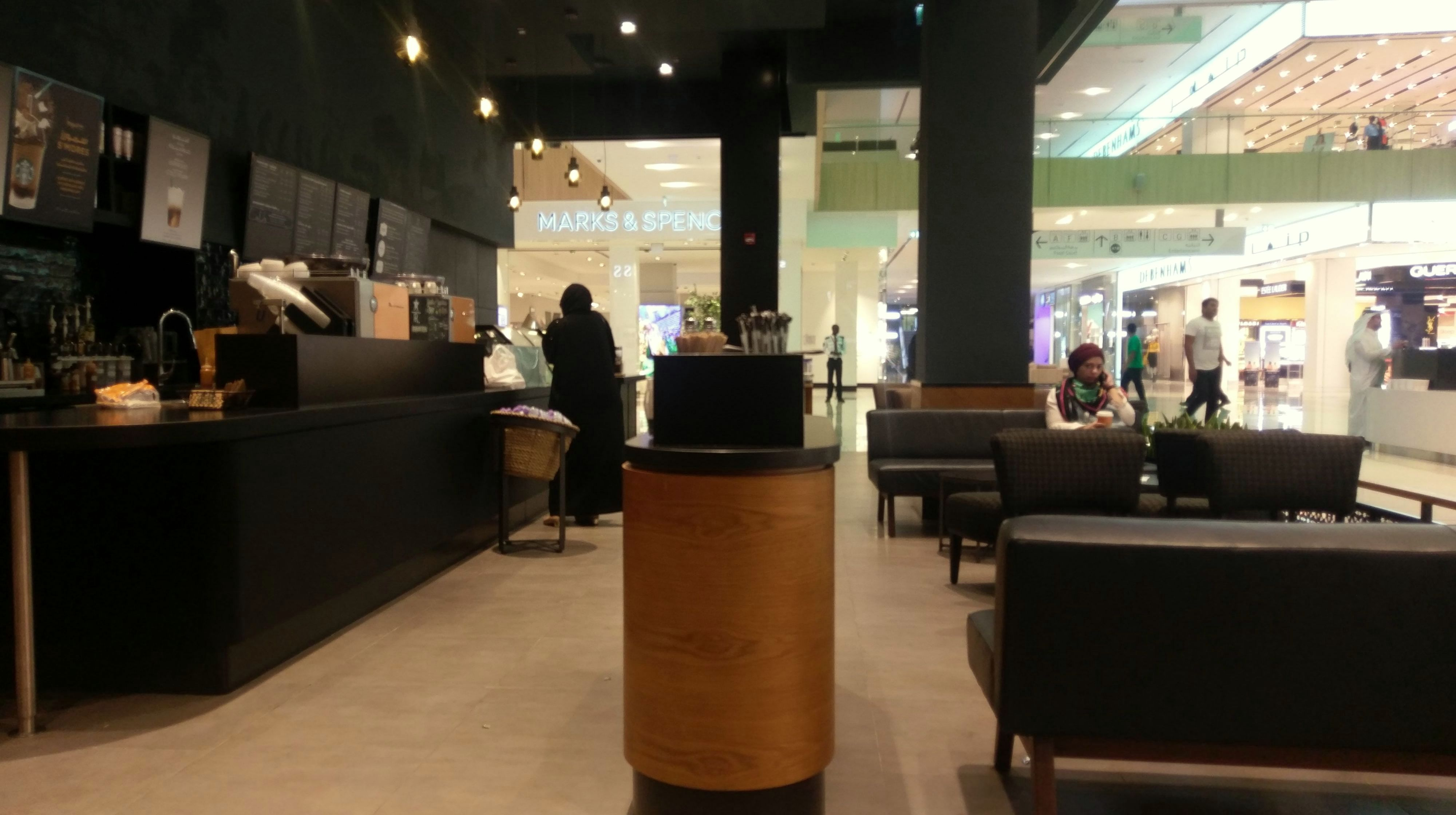
One of the Starbucks coffeehouses inside the Festival City

Doha Festival City has around 246,200 m^{2} of leasable space with over 500 stores, such as first-to-market Hermès Perfume and Beauty, Creed Boutique, Gold Apple Beauty Store, Disney Store, Alo Yoga, JD Sports, Audi City, and Tesla outlet. Anchor tenants include Monoprix hypermarket (which offers sensory friendly hours), Qatar's first Harvey Nichols department store, Ace Hardware, NBA Store, and IKEA. In addition, in 2026 Doha Festival City opened Qatar's first international retailer Primark store in partnership with Alshaya Group. Additionally, it hosts over 100 dining venues across two major food courts. The food and beverage outlets include restaurants such as Raising Cane's, Nando's, The Cheesecake Factory, PF Chang's, Jamie's Italian, Yasmine Palace, Ladurée, and dining options within the Monoprix hypermarket.

Its entertainment venues include Angry Birds World, an indoor and outdoor theme park; Virtuocity, a gaming and e-sports facility; and Snow Dunes, a 9,500 m^{2} indoor snow park. In 2025, these attractions were recognised at the Global RLI Awards, with Virtuocity awarded 'Most Immersive Attraction & Experience' and Angry Birds World highly commended for 'Most Innovative Retail & Entertainment Concept.

The mall's VOX Cinemas features 18 screens, Qatar's first 4DX theater, IMAX, VIP “Theater by Rhodes” screens, and a kids-only cinema. The complex also includes a 3 km Outdoor Leisure Trail for jogging and cycling.

== Accessibility ==
=== Transport links ===
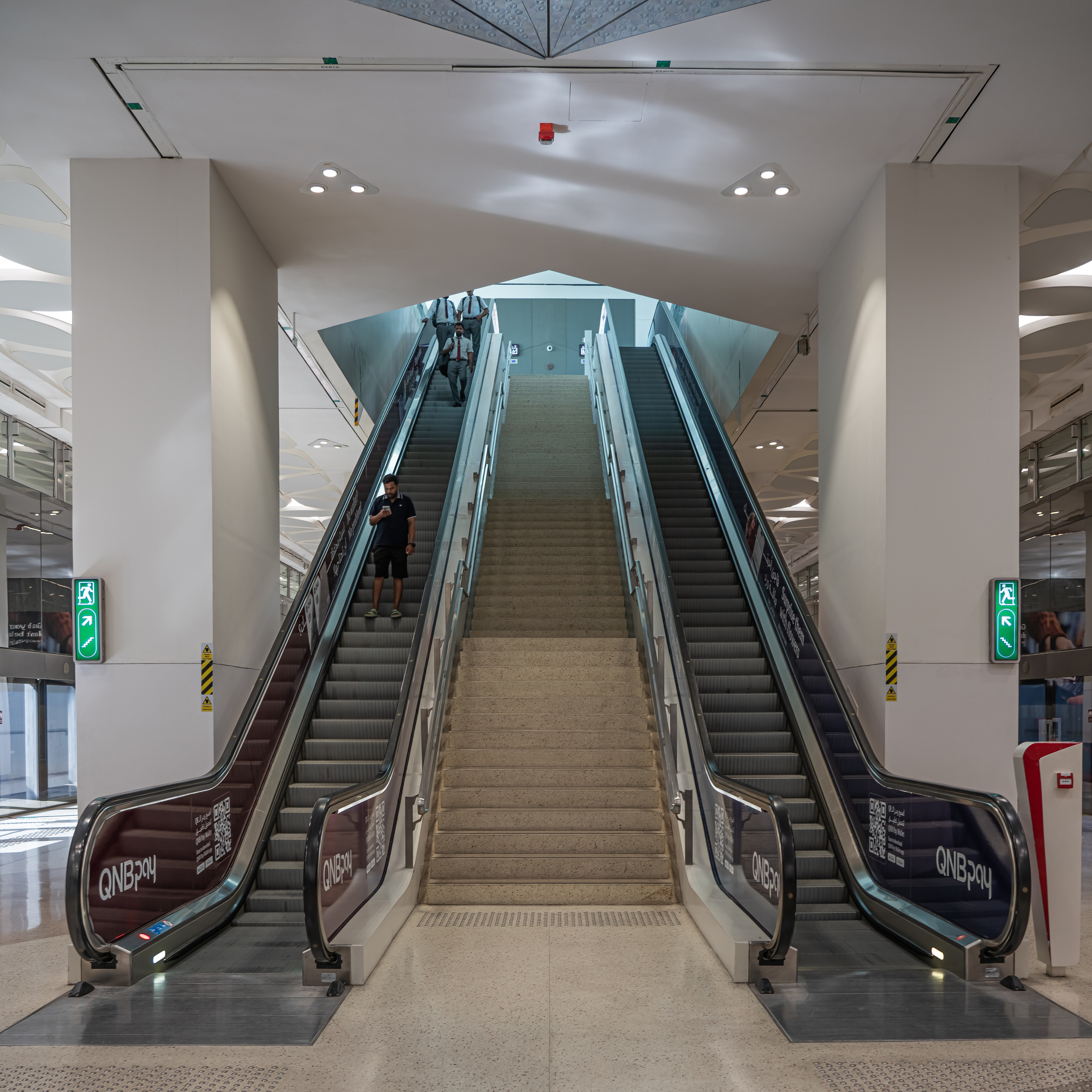
Lusail QNB station, the nearest metro station to Doha Festival City

The bus lines M145 and R701 connect the mall to the public transport, there are two bus stops next to the mall, Doha Festival City and Wadi Al Askar street.

A cab rank is located next to the Festival City, a carpark, a bicycle parking facility as well as a rent a car station of Tesla.

The nearest metro stations are Lusail QNB and Legtaifiya of the red line, while the nearest tram station is Lusail QNB.

=== Barrier free accessibility ===
The entries and also the city and local buses to the mall provide stepless access for wheelchair users. The mall has elevators and escalators as well. There is no guiding line system for the blind or Braille available yet. Wheelchairs can be borrowed at the entries and the receptions as well.
