= Legtaifiya station =

Subway station in Doha, Qatar

Legtaifiya Metro Station الريان القديم محطة مترو

General information
- Location: West Bay Lagoon, Ad Dawhah Municipality, Doha, Qatar; Qatar
- Coordinates: 25.3708°N 51.5249°E
- Owner: Qatar Rail
- Operator: Doha Metro
- Platforms: 2
- Tracks: 2

Construction
- Structure type: Underground
- Parking: Yes
- Accessible: Yes

Other information
- Website: http://www.qr.com.qa/

History
- Opened: 10 December 2019

Services
Preceding station	Doha Metro	Following station
Qatar University towards Lusail	Red Line	Katara towards Al Wakra or Hamad International Airport T1
Preceding station	Lusail Tram	Following station
Terminus	Orange Line transfer at Legtaifiya Station	Marina-South towards Legtaifiya
Terminus	Pink Line transfer at Tarfat-South	Marina-South towards Legtaifiya
Location

Legtaifiya station is a station on the Doha Metro's Red Line. It serves the municipality of Ad Dawhah, specifically Al Qutaifiya, Onaiza, and other suburbs of West Bay Lagoon City. It is situated on the Lusail Expressway.

No metrolink, which is the Doha Metro's free feeder bus network, currently services the station. Facilities on the premises include restrooms and a prayer room.

== History ==
The station was opened to the public on 2 September 2019, almost 4 months after the opening of the first 13 Red Line (Doha Metro) Stations.

== Metrolink Bus ==
There are currently 4 Metrolinks, which is the Doha Metro's free feeder bus network, servicing the station,

- M109, which serves Viva Bahriya.
- M110, which serves Porto Arabia and the Perlita Gardens.
- M152, which serves the Abraj Quartier.
- M153, which serves the Giardino Village and the Floresta Garden.
