= Qatar University station =

Metro station in Lusail, Qatar

Qatar University metro station محطة مترو لوسيل

General information
- Location: Al Khor Coastal Road, Lusail; Qatar
- Owner: Qatar Rail
- Operator: Doha Metro
- Platforms: 1
- Tracks: 2

Construction
- Structure type: Elevated
- Parking: Yes
- Accessible: Yes

Other information
- Website: www.qr.com.qa

History
- Opened: 10 December 2019

Services
Preceding station	Doha Metro	Following station
Lusail Terminus	Red Line	Legtaifiya towards Al Wakra
Location

Qatar University Station is the second northern station of the Doha Metro's Red Line and serves the city of Lusail. The station is located next to Qatar University. Beyond this station, the metro line goes underground.

== History ==
The station was opened to the public on 10 December 2019 along with three other Red Line stations, over six months after the opening of the line's first 13 stations.

== Station facilities ==
Facilities in the station include a prayer room and restrooms.

== Connections ==
There are 3 metrolinks, which is the Doha Metro's free feeder bus network, servicing the station,

- M147, which serves Lusail Marina in Lusail City.
- M148, which serves the University of Doha for Science and Technology.
- M149, which serves Wadi Al Banat in Al Daayen.
