= The Cheesecake Factory =

American restaurant chain

The Cheesecake Factory Incorporated

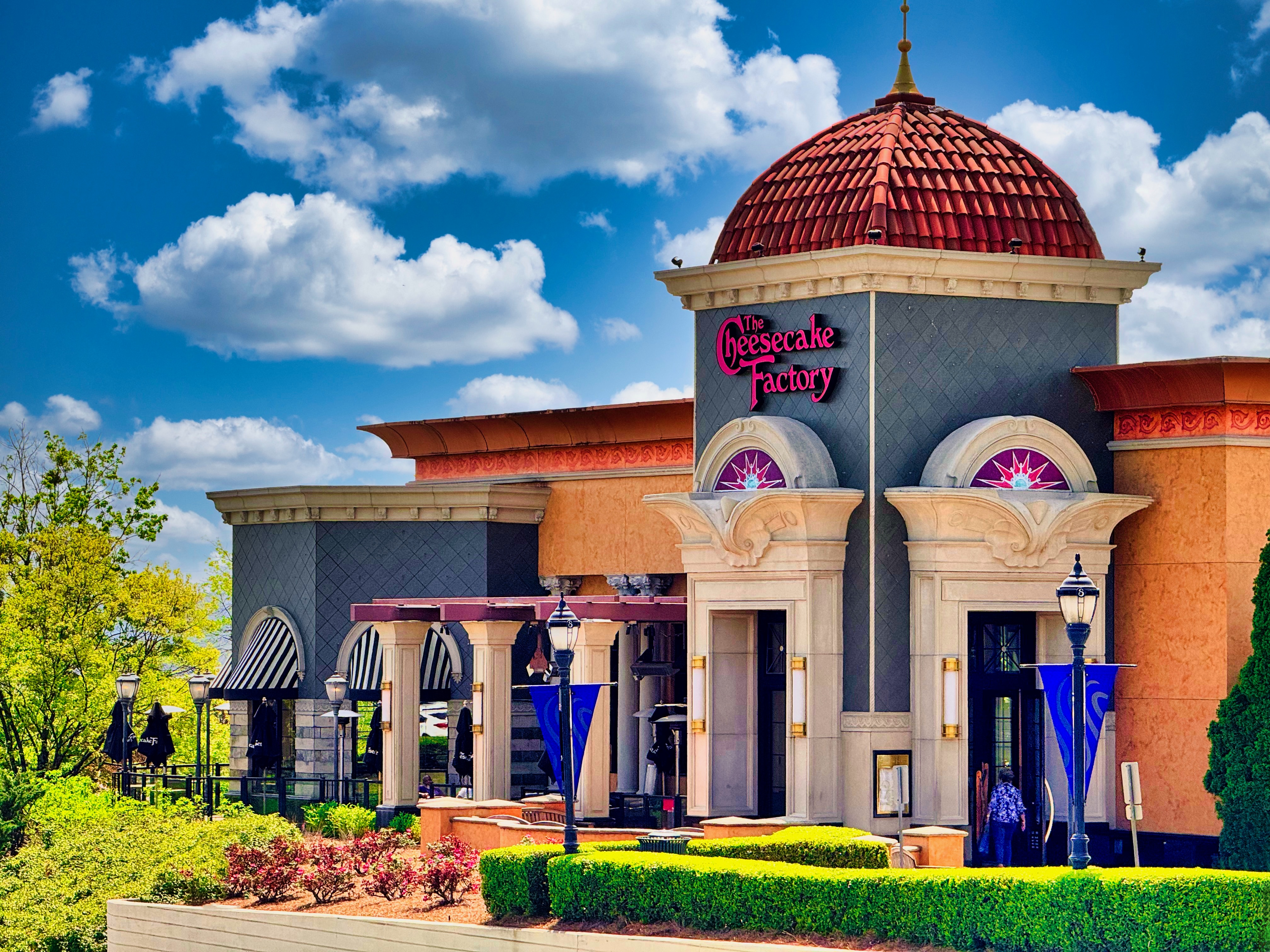
- The Cheesecake Factory at The Summit, Alabama
- Type: Public
- Traded as: Nasdaq: CAKE; S&P 600 component
- Industry: Restaurants
- Founded: 1972; 54 years ago, in Los Angeles, California, U.S. (as a bakery); 1978; 48 years ago, in Beverly Hills, California, U.S. (as a restaurant)
- Founder: David Overton
- Headquarters: Calabasas, California, U.S.
- Number of locations: 370 (2025)
- Area served: United States, Canada, Mexico, Puerto Rico, Bahrain, Kuwait, Qatar, Saudi Arabia, United Arab Emirates, China, Macau, Hong Kong, India, Taiwan, Thailand
- Key people: David Overton (chairman and CEO); David Gordon (president)
- Products: Cheesecakes, burgers, pizza, pasta, steaks, sandwiches
- Revenue: ▲US$3.581 billion (2024)
- Operating income: ▲US$178.317 million (2024)
- Net income: ▲US$156.783 million (2024)
- Total assets: ▼US$2.775 billion (2022)
- Total equity: ▼US$292 million (2022)
- Number of employees: 47,500 (2022)
- Subsidiaries: Grand Lux Cafe, LLC; RockSugar Southeast Asian Kitchen, LLC; Social Monk Asian Kitchen; Fox Restaurant Concepts
- Website: thecheesecakefactory.com

The Cheesecake Factory Incorporated is a restaurant chain and cheesecake distributor based in the United States. It operates 370 full-service restaurants: 218 under the Cheesecake Factory brand, 47 under the North Italia brand, and 105 under other brands. It has bakery production facilities in Calabasas, California, and Rocky Mount, North Carolina.

David M. Overton, the company's founder, opened the first Cheesecake Factory restaurant in Beverly Hills, California, in 1978. The restaurant established the future chain's pattern of featuring an eclectic menu, large portions, and signature cheesecakes. In 2025, Fortune ranked the Cheesecake Factory at number 23 on their Fortune List of the Top 100 Companies to Work For in 2020 based on an employee survey of satisfaction. The Cheesecake Factory's average unit volume consistently leads the casual restaurant industry.

== History ==
=== Founding and early years ===
Evelyn Overton, inspired by a cheesecake recipe from a Detroit newspaper, made a cheesecake for her husband's employer in the 1940s. The cheesecake was well received, and she opened a small cheesecake bakery in Detroit, Michigan, in the late 1950s. She closed the bakery to raise her children but continued supplying cheesecakes to local restaurants from her basement kitchen. In 1967, Evelyn's son David M. Overton left Detroit to attend Hastings College of Law in San Francisco but decided to be a drummer in 1968, performing with the Billy Roberts Blues Band. In 1971, David convinced his parents to relocate to Los Angeles to open a commercial bakery. In 1972, they moved to the Woodland Hills area of Los Angeles where they opened The Cheesecake Factory Bakery, selling cheesecakes and other desserts to local restaurants.

=== First restaurant ===
In 1978, David Overton opened The Cheesecake Factory, a small salad-and-sandwich restaurant in Beverly Hills's golden triangle that sold ten varieties of cheesecakes on a one-page menu. In 1983, he opened a second restaurant in Marina del Rey. By 1987, the Beverly Hills location had expanded into a 78-seat restaurant and was experiencing financial success. This led to the opening of a third, larger location in Redondo Beach, which was eventually renovated into a 300-seat, 21,000-square-foot (2,000 m^{2}) location. As the business expanded, David Overton studied the menu of various upscale restaurants such as Wolfgang Puck's Spago, and tried to replicate their dishes with cheaper ingredients. By the end of the 1980s, The Cheesecake Factory's one-page menu had expanded, and the restaurant offered additional entrees and short-order items.

=== Expansion beyond Southern California ===
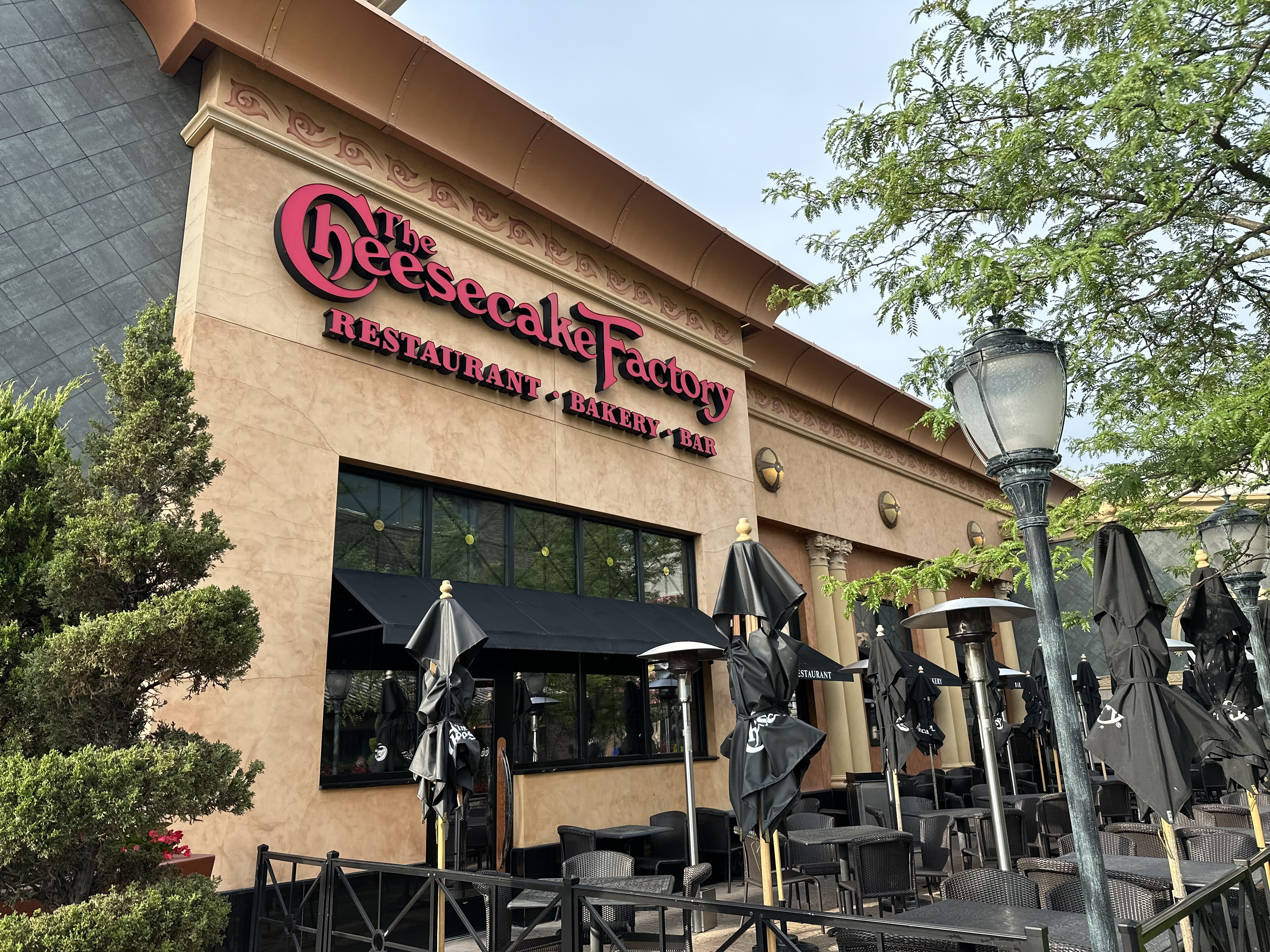
The Cheesecake Factory at Ross Park Mall in Pittsburgh, Pennsylvania

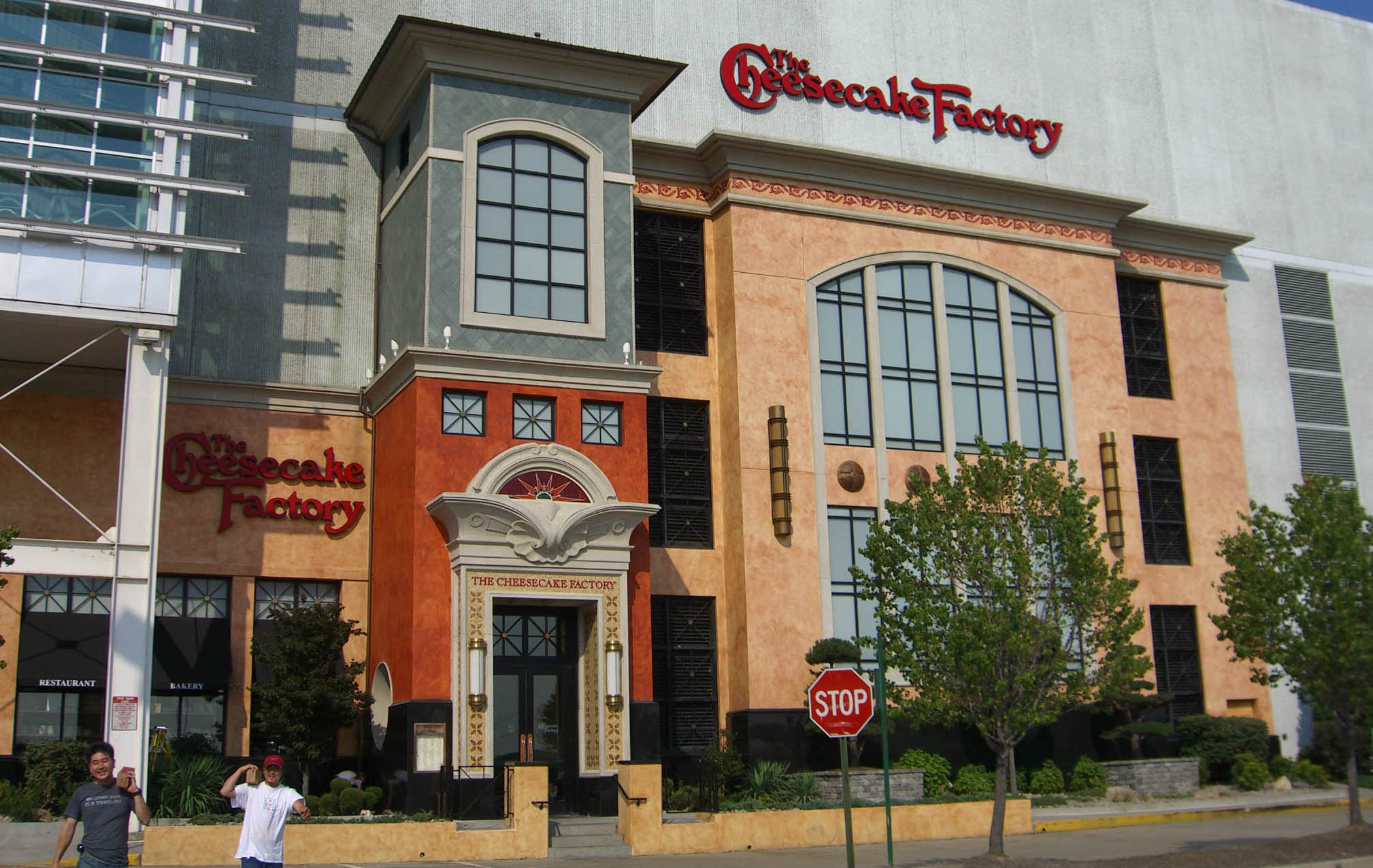
The Cheesecake Factory at Palisades Center in West Nyack, New York

The first Cheesecake Factory restaurant outside of Southern California opened in the 1990s. The new restaurant, the chain's fifth, was located in Washington, D.C. The Cheesecake Factory was incorporated in 1992 and went public in September of that year. David Overton planned to open three to four units a year to generate a 25% yearly increase in sales.

The company began changing its menu twice a year and adding steaks, seafood, and vegetarian dishes. As of April 2013, the Cheesecake Factory operated 162 restaurants in 36 states under the Cheesecake Factory name. The first Cheesecake Factory in Puerto Rico opened on August 28, 2013, located in Plaza Las Américas in San Juan.

The company used to operate one self-service, limited-menu express food service operation under the Cheesecake Factory marque inside DisneyQuest at the Walt Disney World Resort in Lake Buena Vista, Florida. It opened in 1998 and closed in 2017.

=== International expansion ===
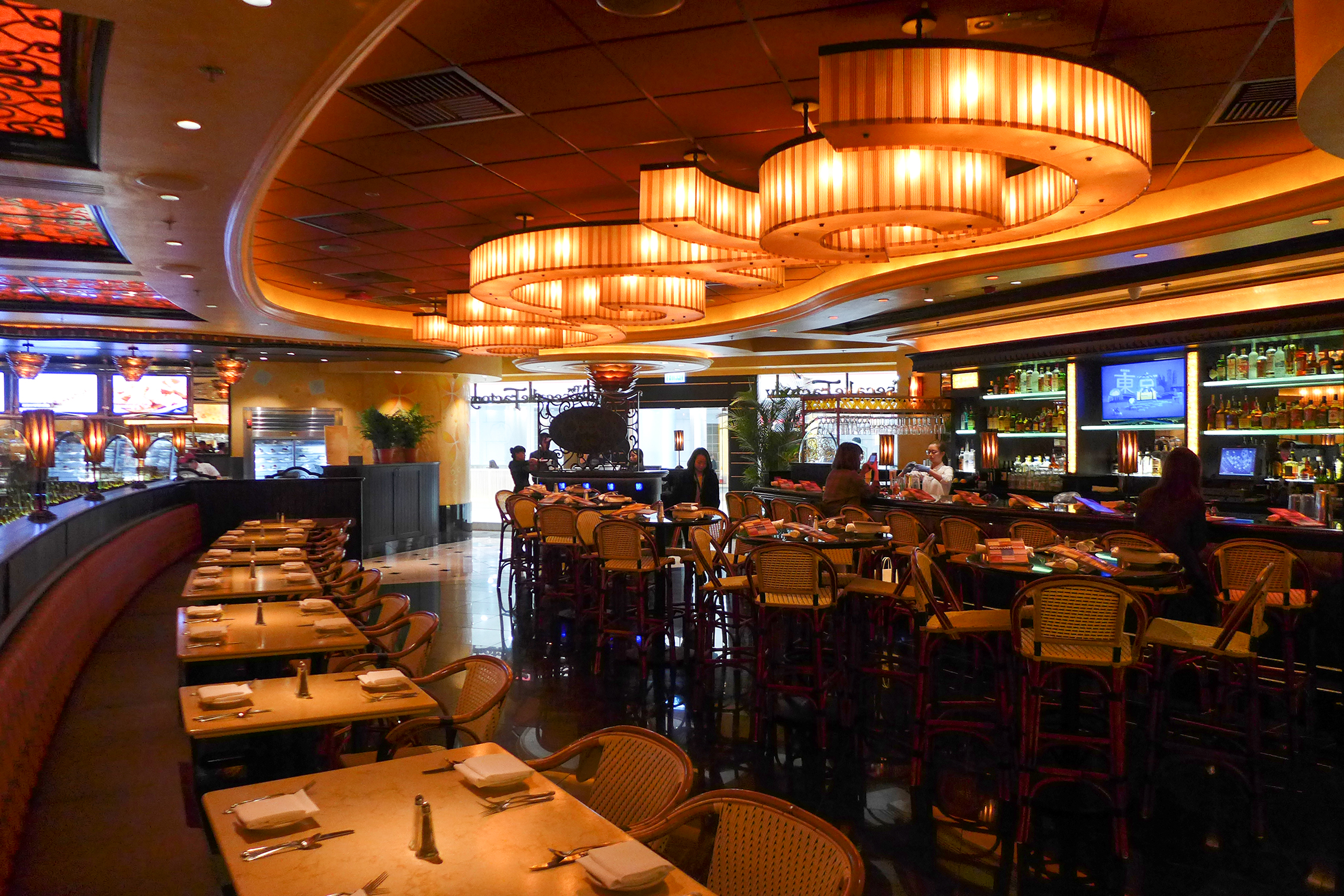
The Cheesecake Factory in Hong Kong

As of 2024, the Cheesecake Factory has locations in Bahrain, Canada, China, Hong Kong, Kuwait, Macau, Mexico, Qatar, Saudi Arabia, Thailand, the United Arab Emirates and the United States.

On January 25, 2011, the company expanded into the Middle East in a partnership with Kuwaiti retail franchising company M.H. Alshaya Co. The 300-seat restaurant opened on August 16, 2012, at The Dubai Mall. This was The Cheesecake Factory's first location outside the United States. As of May 2018, The Cheesecake Factory has eleven restaurants in the Middle East: four in Dubai (Dubai Mall, Mall of Emirates, Jumeirah Beach Residence and Dubai Festival City Mall), three in Kuwait (Arabella, Sidra, and The Avenues—which was the 160th Cheesecake Factory opening), two in Saudi Arabia (Riyadh and Jeddah), and one in the Yas Mall and one in The Galleria in Abu Dhabi. On December 1, 2015, The Cheesecake Factory opened its eighth Middle East branch at the Verdun Shopping Center in Beirut, Lebanon. The Cheesecake Factory made its first appearance in Doha, Qatar, by opening in the Mall of Qatar and further opened two more branches in Villaggio and Doha Festival City.

On June 16, 2016, The Cheesecake Factory opened its first location in East Asia in Disneytown, located in Pudong, Shanghai, China. The first Cheesecake Factory in Mexico opened in Guadalajara in 2014. There are Cheesecake Factories in Parque Delta and Centro Santa Fe, Mexico City. In November 2017, the first Canadian location opened at Yorkdale Shopping Centre in Toronto, Ontario. In May 2017, a Hong Kong restaurant opened in Harbour City, Tsim Sha Tsui.

=== Architecture and design ===
The external appearance and interior design of the outlets often features an elaborate pastiche of many different historical styles and has been described as a "postmodern design hellscape", or "postmodern suburban Versailles" . In-house designer Rick McCormack has said that the design is "heavily inspired by San Francisco restaurants of the 1970s" and that he was going for "a little bit of an exotic or European feel".

In 2026, former U.S. president Barack Obama made reference to the design style when he described Donald Trump's remodeling of the White House as "looking like Saddam Hussein had opened a Cheesecake Factory". Donald Trump's team denounced the statement by calling Barack Obama's comments elitist, with Scott Bessent holding a press conference outside a Cheesecake Factory in Washington. Obama later ridiculed this response saying that Trump was more concerned about the comparison with the Cheesecake Factory than with the comparison with Saddam Hussein, while The Daily Beast also reported that Trump had quietly bought shares in the company in 2025.

== Criticism and controversy ==
=== Animal welfare ===
In 2012, the Cheesecake Factory committed to eliminate the use of gestation crates from its pork supply chain by 2022. In its 2021 Corporate Social Responsibility Report, it stated that by the end of 2022, 75% of its U.S. pork supply would be crate-free. In 2024, the Cheesecake Factory was highlighted by animal welfare organization Animal Equality for having made progress toward eliminating gestation crates in its supply chain, but not having eliminated them entirely.

In 2015, the Cheesecake Factory stated that it would eliminate the use of battery cage eggs from its supply chain, but did not specify a timeline for doing so. In 2023, it was identified by The Humane League and the Open Wing Alliance for failing to report progress on its cage-free transition. In March 2025, The Humane League stated that the Cheesecake Factory had achieved a 100% cage-free transition.

=== Legal problems ===
On December 4, 2020, the U.S. Securities and Exchange Commission resolved charges brought against the Cheesecake Factory for allegedly misleading investors about the company’s financial status during the COVID-19 pandemic. The company paid a $125,000 fine without admitting the findings in the order.

== Other restaurants ==
The Cheesecake Factory Bakery Cafe operates two bakery production facilities in Calabasas Hills, California, and Rocky Mount, North Carolina, and licenses two bakery-based menus to other food service operators. This division operates worldwide.

=== Grand Lux Cafe ===
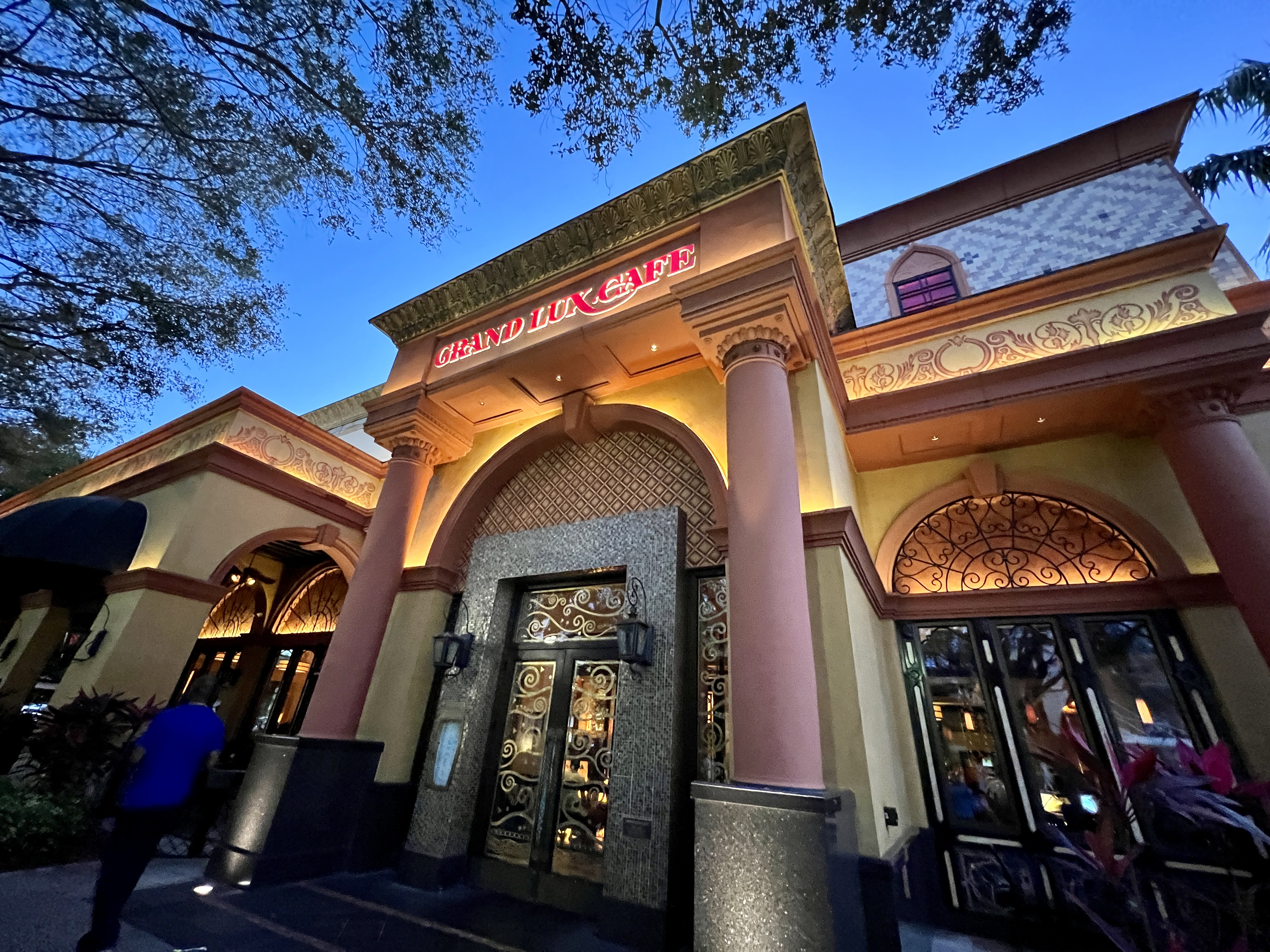
The Grand Lux Cafe in The Colonnade Outlets at Sawgrass Mills in Sunrise, Florida, in February 2022

David Overton designed the Grand Lux Cafe, an upscale restaurant for The Venetian hotel and casino in Las Vegas. The restaurant is modeled after Italian, French, and Austrian styles.

=== RockSugar Southeast Asian Kitchen ===
RockSugar Southeast Asian Kitchen was a contemporary Asian-fusion restaurant that opened on June 19, 2008, at Century City in Los Angeles. David Overton excluded Chinese and Japanese cuisines from the menu, as these are served at the Grand Lux and Cheesecake Factory restaurants. It closed on December 31, 2020, at least in part to the COVID-19 pandemic. A second location opened in Oak Brook, Illinois, in November 2017, but closed in December 2019.

=== Fox Restaurant Concepts ===
On July 31, 2019, The Cheesecake Factory announced it had reached an agreement to buy Phoenix-based Fox Restaurant Concepts (FRC) for $308 million in cash at closing and another $45 million due over the next four years.

The interior of a North Italia restaurant in Dunwoody, Georgia

== Menu ==
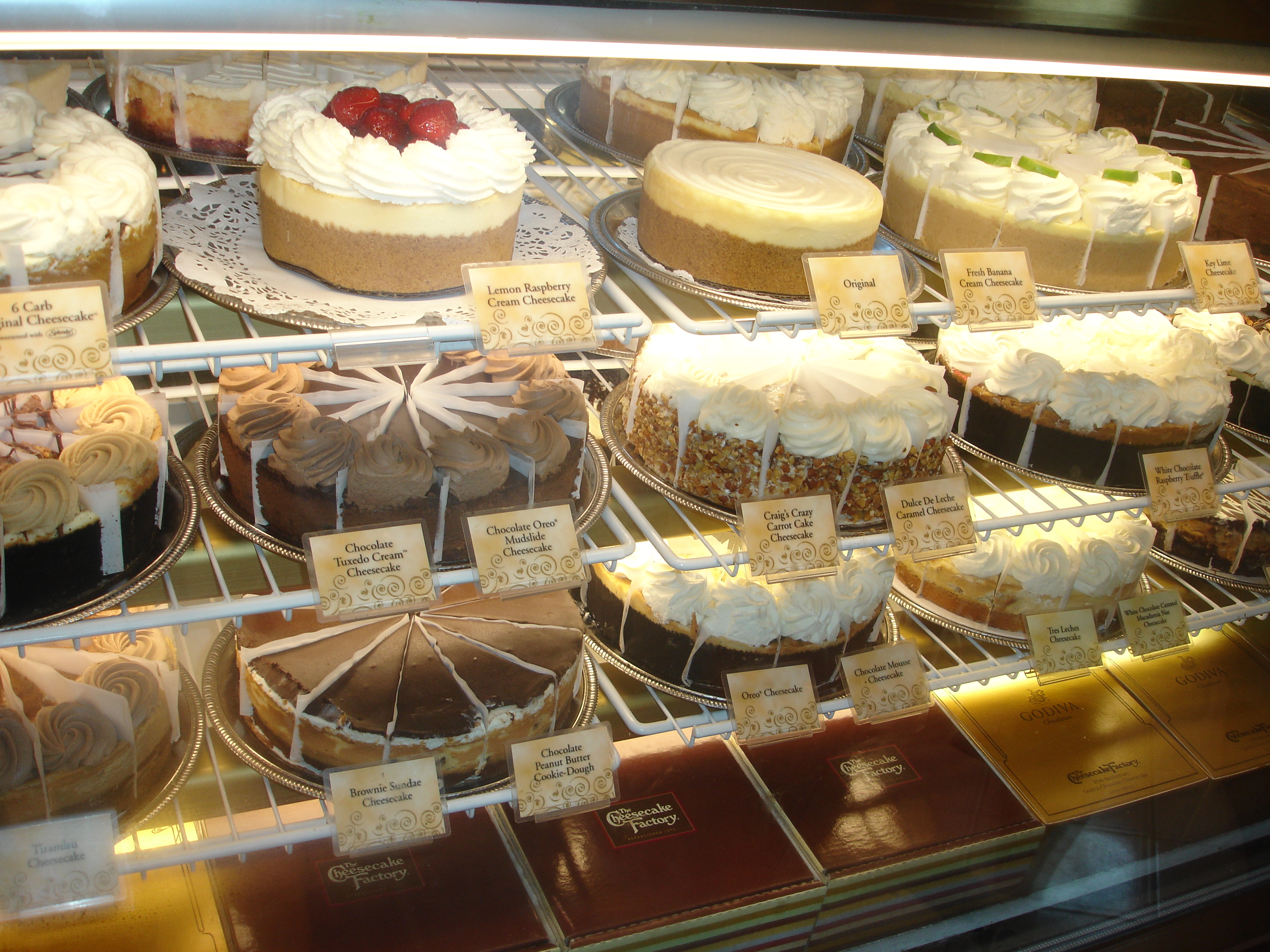
Several cheesecakes on display at a location in Naples, Florida

The Cheesecake Factory dining menu includes steaks, chops, burgers, chicken, seafood, sandwiches, pasta, pizza, soups, and salads in various cuisines. In addition to its regular dining menu, the company offers a lower-calorie menu that includes salads, burgers, sandwiches, and small plates. The brunch menu is offered on Saturdays and Sundays and includes pancakes, waffles, French toast, and eggs.

The dessert menu offers various types of cheesecake, as well as other cakes, milkshakes, ice cream, and specialty desserts. Per a company spokesperson, the restaurant sells almost 35 million slices of cheesecake annually.

The more than 250 menu items are all made from scratch to order, except for the cheesecakes which are produced in bakery production facilities and delivered to the restaurants frozen.

David Overton said the menu appealed to the "palate of the common man".

=== Caloric content ===
The Cheesecake Factory has been criticized for featuring large servings of high-calorie and high-fat foods. For these reasons, the chain was dubbed the "worst family restaurant in America" for 2010 by Men's Health magazine. The average sandwich at the restaurant contains 1,400 calories. In 2013, the Center for Science in the Public Interest noted that the "Crispy Chicken Costoletta" has more calories (2,610) than a 12-piece bucket of fried chicken from KFC, and the Cheesecake Factory's "Bistro Shrimp Pasta" dish had more calories than any other entrée from a national chain restaurant at 3,120 calories, with 89 grams of saturated fat. In 2015, the Cheesecake Factory created a "SkinnyLicious" menu with lower calorie items that features a variety of cocktails, salads, appetizers, and specialty dishes.

== See also ==
- List of restaurant chains
