= Hamad International Airport =

International airport serving Doha, Qatar

Hamad International Airport مطار حمد الدولي
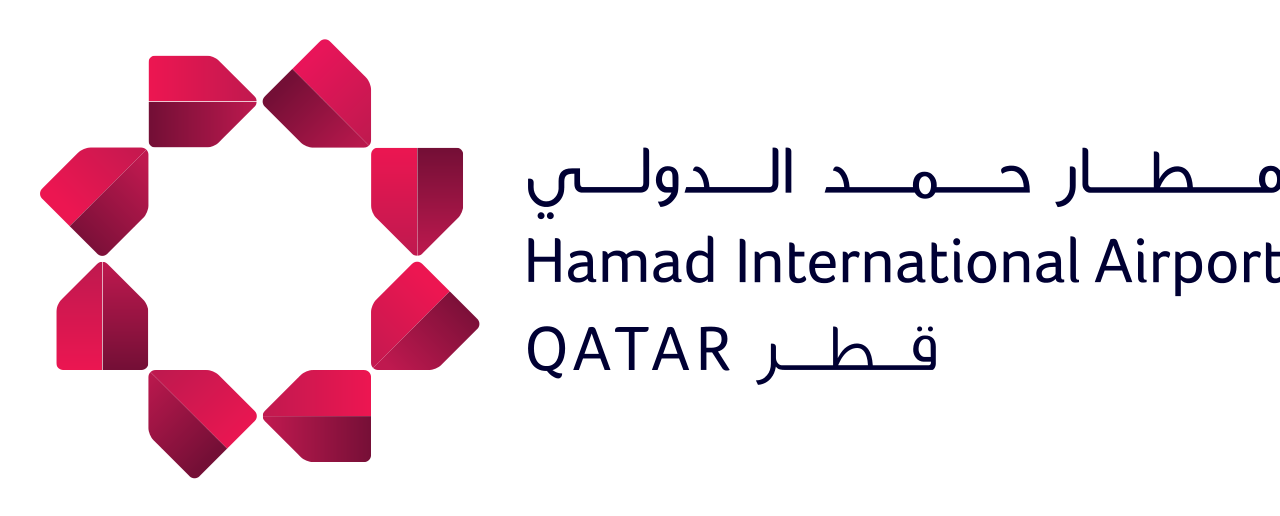

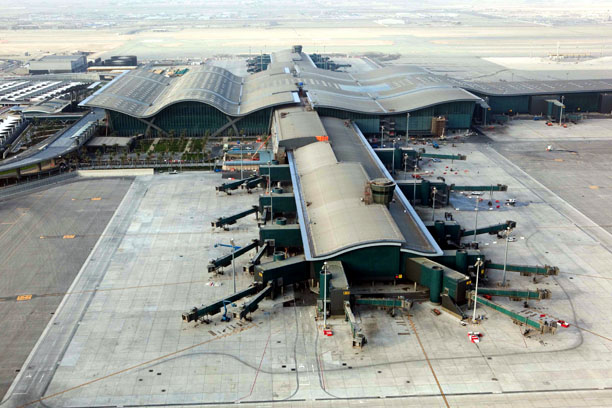
- IATA: DOH; ICAO: OTHH

Summary
- Airport type: Public
- Owner: Qatar Civil Aviation Authority
- Operator: Qatar Airways
- Serves: Qatar
- Location: Doha, Qatar
- Opened: 27 May 2014; 12 years ago
- Hub for: Qatar Airways; Qatar Airways Cargo; Qatar Executive
- Elevation AMSL: 4 m (13 ft)
- Coordinates: 25°16′23″N 51°36′29″E
- Website: dohahamadairport.com

Maps
- Location in Qatar
- Interactive map of Hamad International Airport

Runways
Direction	Length		Surface
Direction	m	ft	Surface
16L/34R	4,850	15,912	Asphalt
16R/34L	4,250	13,944	Asphalt

Statistics (2025)
- Passenger movements: 54,300,000 ▲3%
- Aircraft movements: 282,975 ▲1.5%
- Cargo (metric tonnes): 2,590,000 ▼0.5%
- Source: Hamad International Airport

Hamad International Airport (Arabic: مطار حمد الدولي, Maṭār Ḥamad al-Duwalī; IATA: DOH, ICAO: OTHH) is an international airport in Qatar, and the home base of the national flag carrier airline, Qatar Airways. Located east of the capital, Doha, it replaced the nearby Doha International Airport as Qatar's principal and main national airport and one of the busiest airports in the Middle East.

Formerly known as New Doha International Airport (NDIA) during construction, Hamad International Airport was originally scheduled to open in 2008. After a series of costly delays, it eventually opened six years later, on 30 April 2014, with a ceremonial Qatar Airways flight landing from nearby Doha International. Qatar Airways and all other carriers formally relocated to the new airport on 27 May 2014. The airport is named after Hamad bin Khalifa Al Thani, who was Emir of Qatar from 1995 to 2013.

== History ==
=== Planning and construction ===
By the end of the 20th century, Doha International Airport (DIA) was over 70 years old and in need of major upgrades. However, lack of available land meant DIA expansion would be difficult, especially the inability to add a second runway. The planning started for a new state-of-the-art airport in 2003 while the construction began in 2005. The site of the airport (terminal and runway) lies 5 kilometres (3.1 mi) east of the older Doha International Airport. It is spread over an area of 3,600 hectares (9,000 acres), and was set to initially serve airlines that will not utilize lounge access.

Hamad International Airport was designed to cater for a projected ongoing increase in the volume of traffic. The airport has an initial annual capacity of 29 million passengers, three times the current volume. Upon completion, it will be able to handle 93 million passengers per year, making it the second largest airport in the region after Dubai. It is also expected to handle 320,000 aircraft movements and 2 million tonnes of cargo annually. The check-in and retail areas are expected to be 12 times larger than those at the current airport. The airport will be two-thirds the size of Doha city. The airport has an oasis theme. Many of the buildings have a water motif, with wave-styled roofs and desert plants growing in recycled water. The airport is built over 36 square kilometres (14 sq mi), half of which is on reclaimed land.

The Steering Committee awarded the contract for the development of the airport to Bechtel. The contract includes the design, construction management and project management of the facilities. The terminal and concourses were designed by the architecture firm HOK. Engineering, Procurement and Construction contracts for Phase I and II were undertaken by Turkish TAV Construction and Japanese Taisei Corporation.

=== Opening ===
Cargo operations began on 1 December 2013, with an inaugural flight by Qatar Airways Cargo arriving from Europe. The original soft launch on 2 April 2013 was cancelled just a few hours prior, and was postponed indefinitely due to unsatisfactory safety related issues that needed further reviewing taking nine months to address. Hamad International Airport was then set to begin passenger operations in January 2014, with a soft opening.

Qatar Airways threatened a $600 million lawsuit against the joint venture contractor Lindner Depa Interiors for delaying the opening of the airport by failing to complete its lounges on time; LDI stated that it was delayed due to inadequate site access. Qatar Airways later blamed Bechtel for the opening delay in April 2013, citing failures to meet regulatory requirements.

=== Operations ===
Hamad International Airport began passenger operations on 30 April 2014, with ten initial airlines operating. Qatar Airways and remaining airlines started operations to Hamad Airport on 27 May 2014 at 09:00 (Qatar time).

An expansion plan announced in September 2015 called for an extension of the check-in area, an expansion of concourses D and E into a 1.3 km (0.81 mi) long concourse, and a new passenger amenity area in the D/E complex with lounges, shops and restaurants. As part of this expansion plan, the Doha Metro was extended to the airport with the opening of the red line airport branch in December 2019.

In 2016, the airport was named the 50th busiest airport in the world by passenger traffic, serving 37,283,987 passengers, a 20.2% increase from 2015. In 2019, the airport witnessed a 12.4% increase in annual passenger traffic. More than 38.8 million passengers arrived at the airport in 2019, up from 34.5 million in 2018. In 2024, Hamad International Airport was rated as the "World's Best Airport" and "Best Airport in the Middle East" by Skytrax. In 2025, the airport handled 54.3 million passengers, an increase of 3% over 2024 totals.

Airport layout

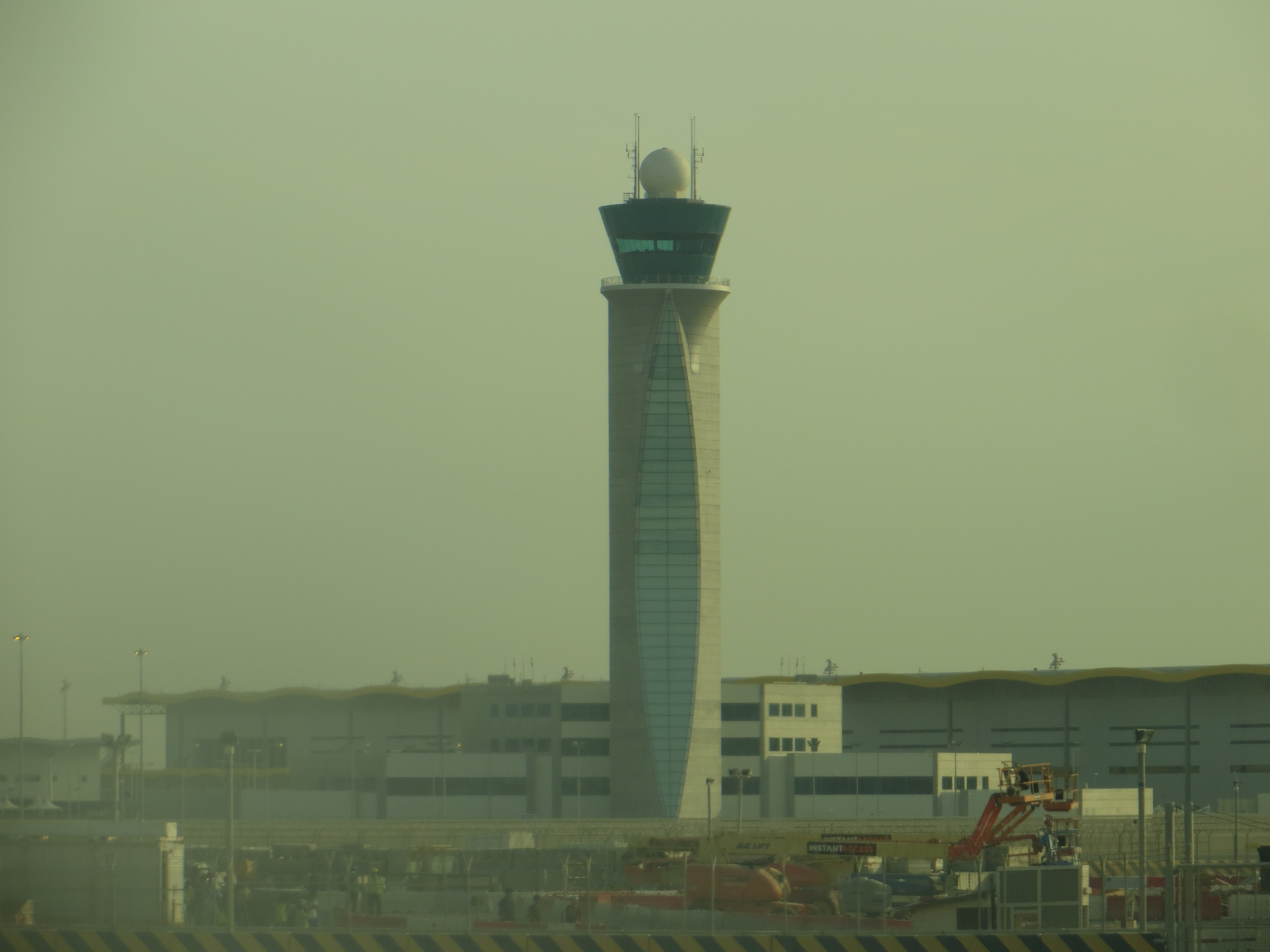
Air traffic control tower

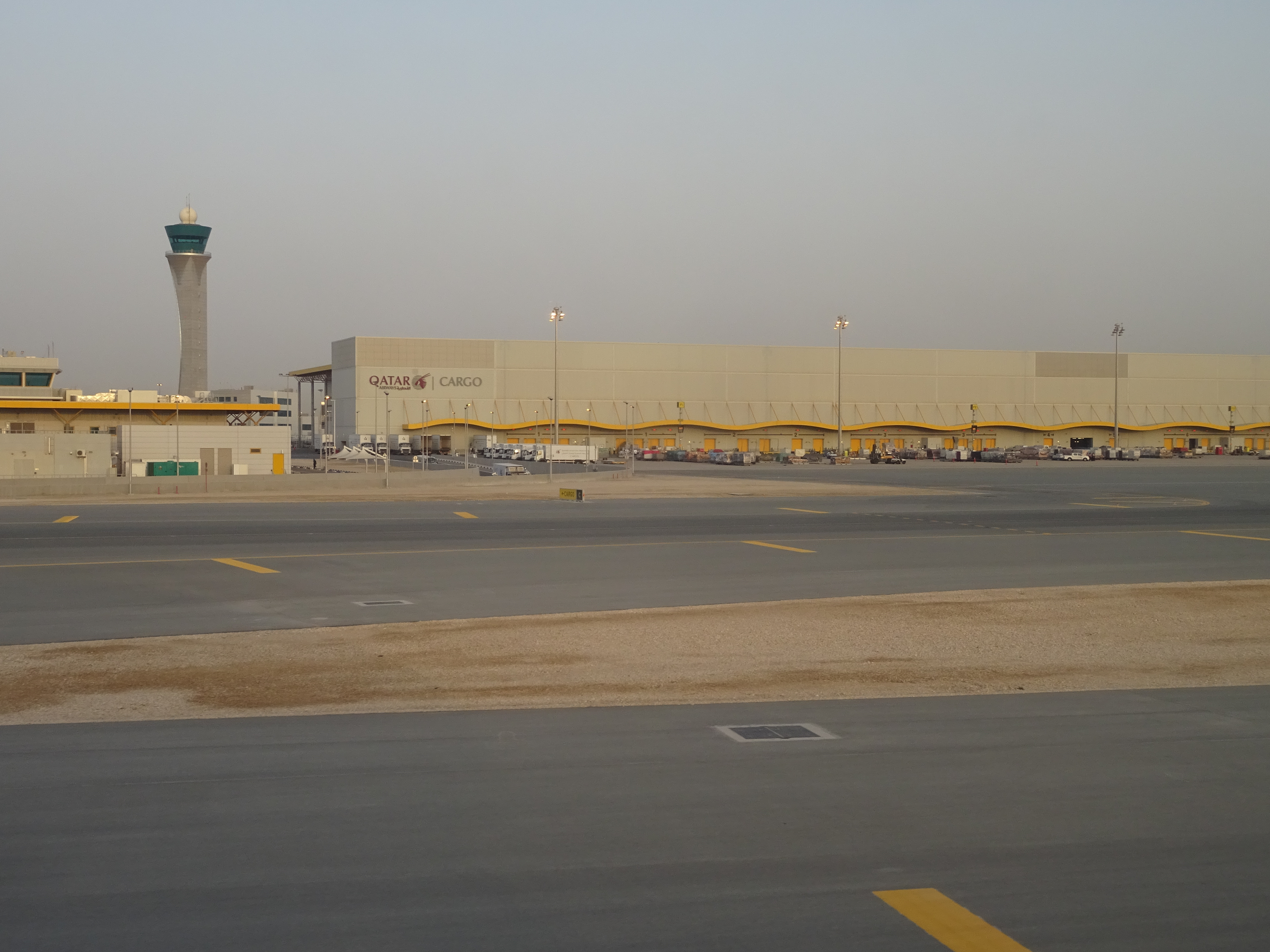
Cargo terminal

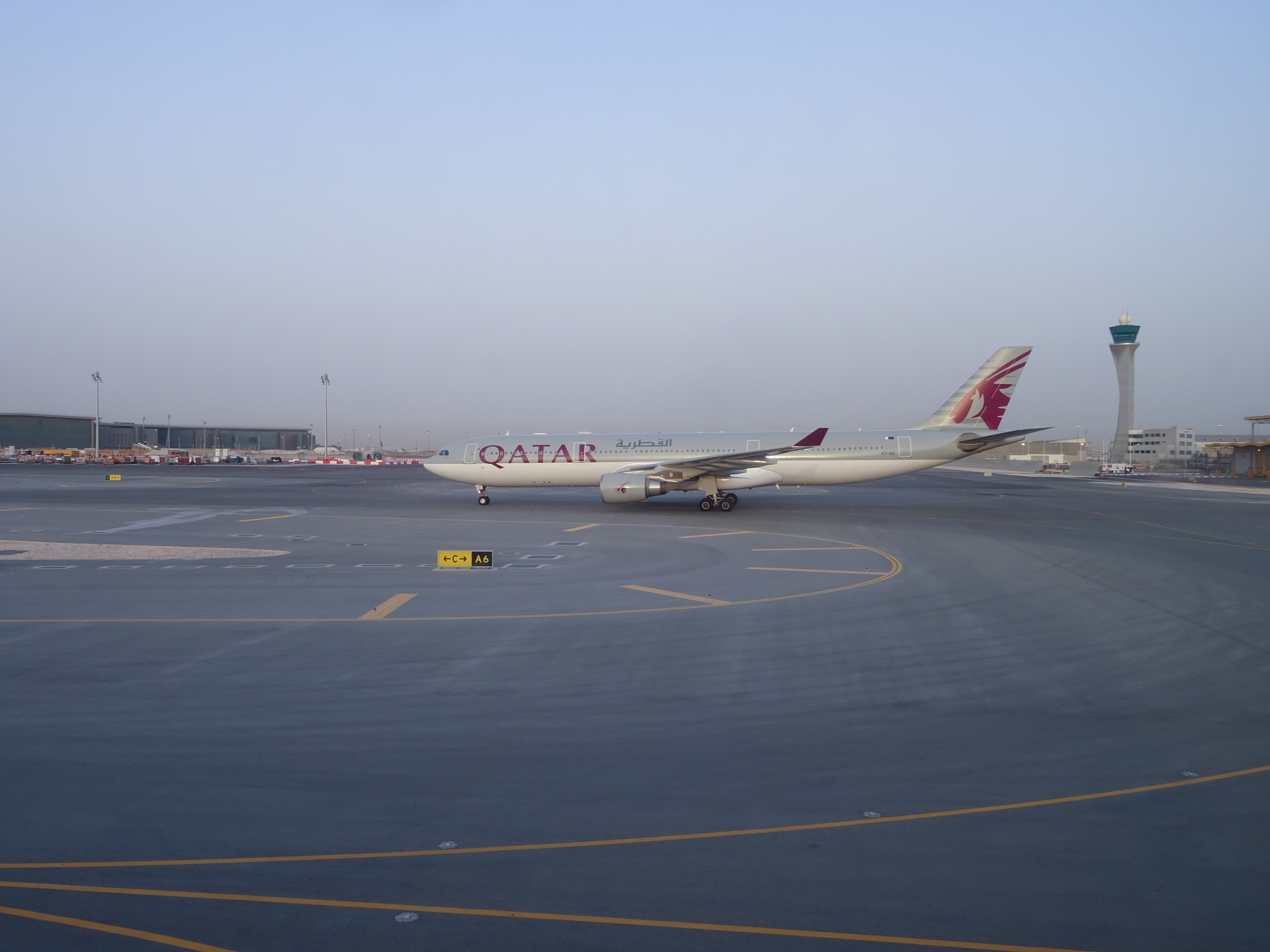
Qatar Airways Airbus A330-300 taxiing at the airport

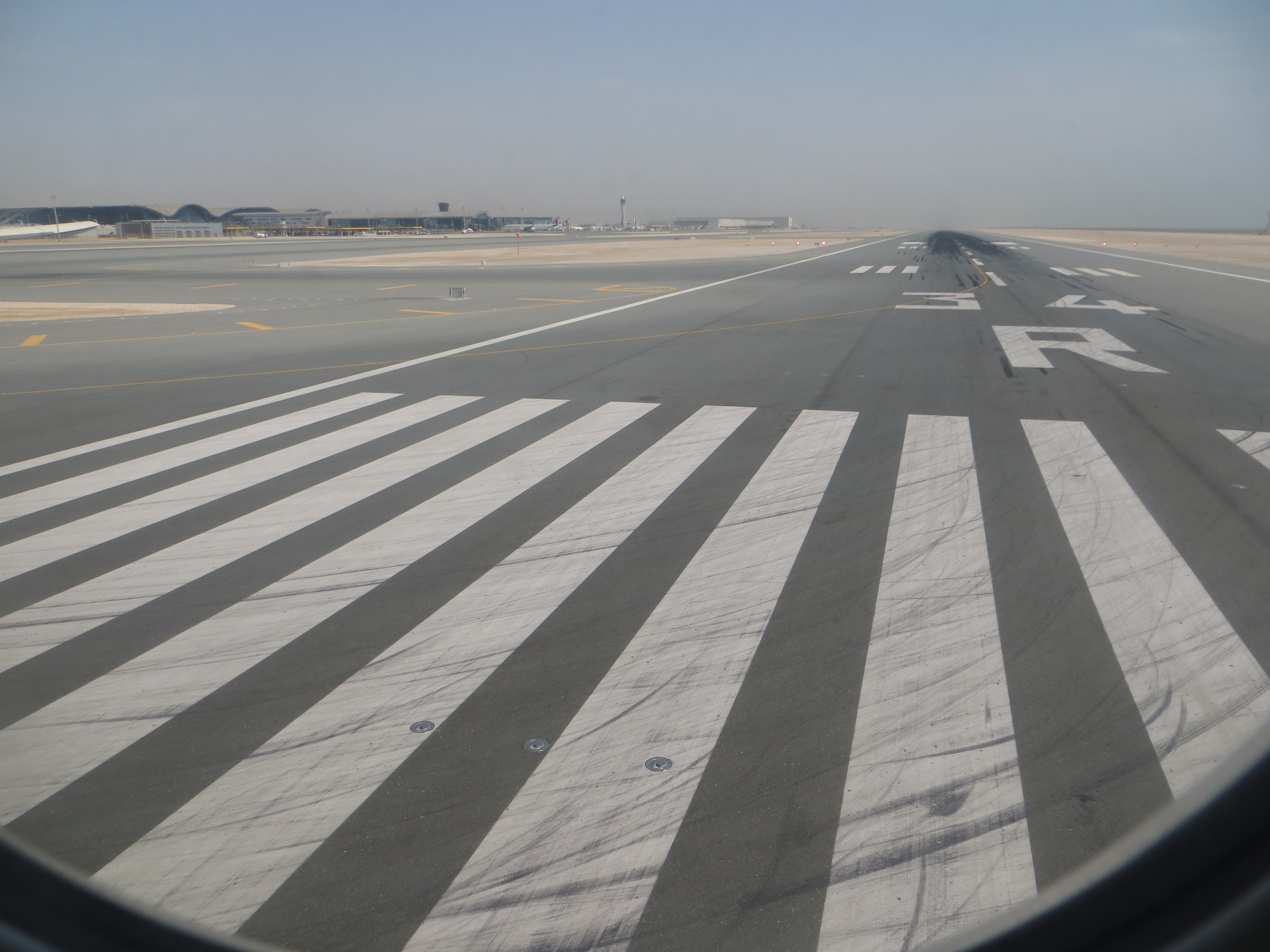
Runway 34R

== Facilities ==
=== Terminal 1 ===
- Concourse A has 10 passenger gates connected to jet bridges and is located west of the check-in area and Main Terminal. Two of the gates are designed to accommodate the Airbus A380.
- Concourse B has 10 passenger gates connected to jet bridges and is located east of the check-in area. It opened on April 30, 2014, with 10 airlines transferring operations over from Doha International Airport. Two of the gates are built to accommodate the Airbus A380. There is a small coffee shop located at the end of Concourse B, as well as smoking rooms, family areas, and an express duty-free store.
- Concourse C has 24 passenger gates connected to jet bridges, two of them built specifically for the Airbus A380. There are 44 remote gates without a fixed jet bridge link connected to Concourse C. This Concourse has opened on 27 May 2014. Gates from the former Concourses D and E were incorporated in to Concourse C in 2021 in preparation for the expansion of Concourses D and E.

Concourses D and E were opened in March 2025 and plans for a possible Concourse F are still to be finalised. Terminal 1 features First (called Al Safwa First Class Lounge) and Business Class (called Al Mourjan Business Class Lounge) lounges, which were opened by Qatar Airways CEO, Akbar Al Baker, on 20 June 2014. Since 2016, a cable-drawn Cable Liner has connected Halls A and B over a distance of around 500 m (1,600 ft) indoors with Halls D and E, with availability 24 hours a day.

==== Lamp Bear ====
The most prominent figure inside the airport is a giant bronze statue of a teddy bear with its head in a lamp. The untitled sculpture, often known as "Lamp Bear", is one of three creations by Swiss artist Urs Fischer and is on display at the grand foyer of the airport's duty-free shopping hall. Standing at seven meters tall and weighing approximately 18-20 tons, the statue was previously displayed at the Seagram Building's plaza in New York City before being purchased by a member of the Qatari royal family at a Christie's auction for US$6.8 million.

In 2018, the airport added a new sculpture in their terminal, called Small Lie by American artist Kaws, which was a donation from Qatar Museums.

==== Expansion ====
The airport handled 34.5 million passengers in 2018 and this is expected to rise to 53 million by 2020. So there were plans to expand the terminal to accommodate the increased passengers' numbers of the FIFA 2022 World Cup, and to keep up with Qatar Airways' continued passenger growth.

As phase A, a new central concourse located in the triangle area between the existing Concourse's D & E with 9 stands for wide-body aircraft, a 10,000-square-metre (110,000 sq ft) tropical garden known as "The Orchard" and a 268-meter (879 ft) tall water feature opened on 10 November 2023, bearing extreme similarities to the Singapore Changi Airport's Jewel structure which was designed and built four years prior. The project adds 11,720 square metres (126,200 sq ft) of retail and F&B space, and an expanded transfer area. A new Qatar Airways Al Mourjan Business Class 'The Garden Lounge' occupies the mezzanine level, covering 9,000 square metres (97,000 sq ft).

The phase B expansion extended the D and E concourses and increased the passenger capacity of the airport to more than 70 million passengers a year. Construction on Phase B expansion commenced in January 2023. The phase B expansion was completed in March 2025.

=== Runways ===
The airport has two parallel runways, located 2 kilometres (1.2 mi) from each other, which are designed for simultaneous take-offs and landings. The first is 4,850 m × 60 m (15,910 ft × 200 ft) and is considered to be the longest runway in Western Asia, and also one of the longest runways in the world. The second runway is 4,250 m × 60 m (13,940 ft × 200 ft).

=== Mosque ===
Completed in c. 2017, the Hamad International Airport Mosque is located outside the passenger terminal, within walking distance from the Departures Hall. The mosque's unique 5,000-square-metre (54,000 sq ft) mushroom-domed aluminium and glass-panelled ceiling was inspired by the shape of a water droplet. A minaret is located adjacent to the mosque. The airport also has an additional sixteen prayer rooms.

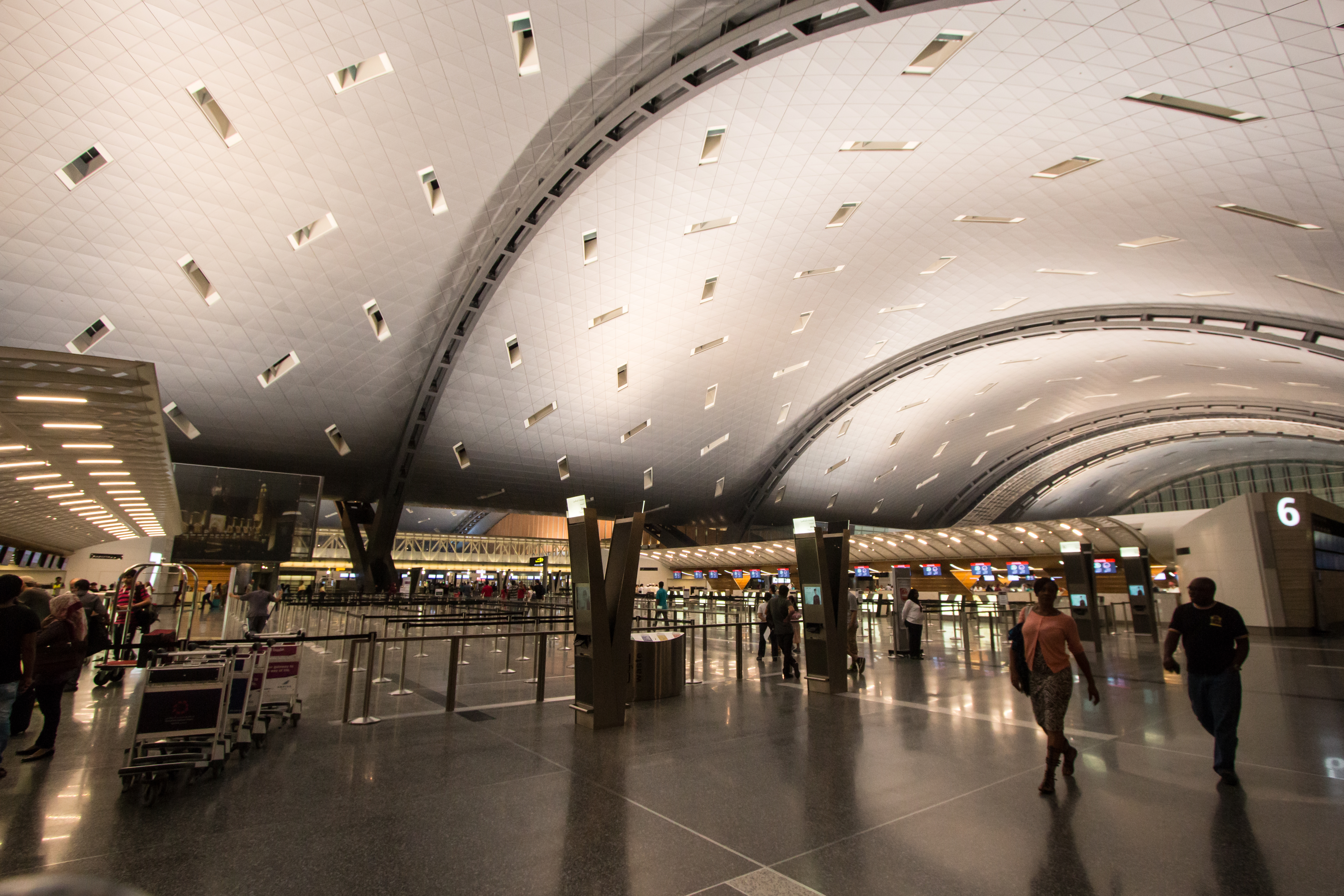
Check-in hall

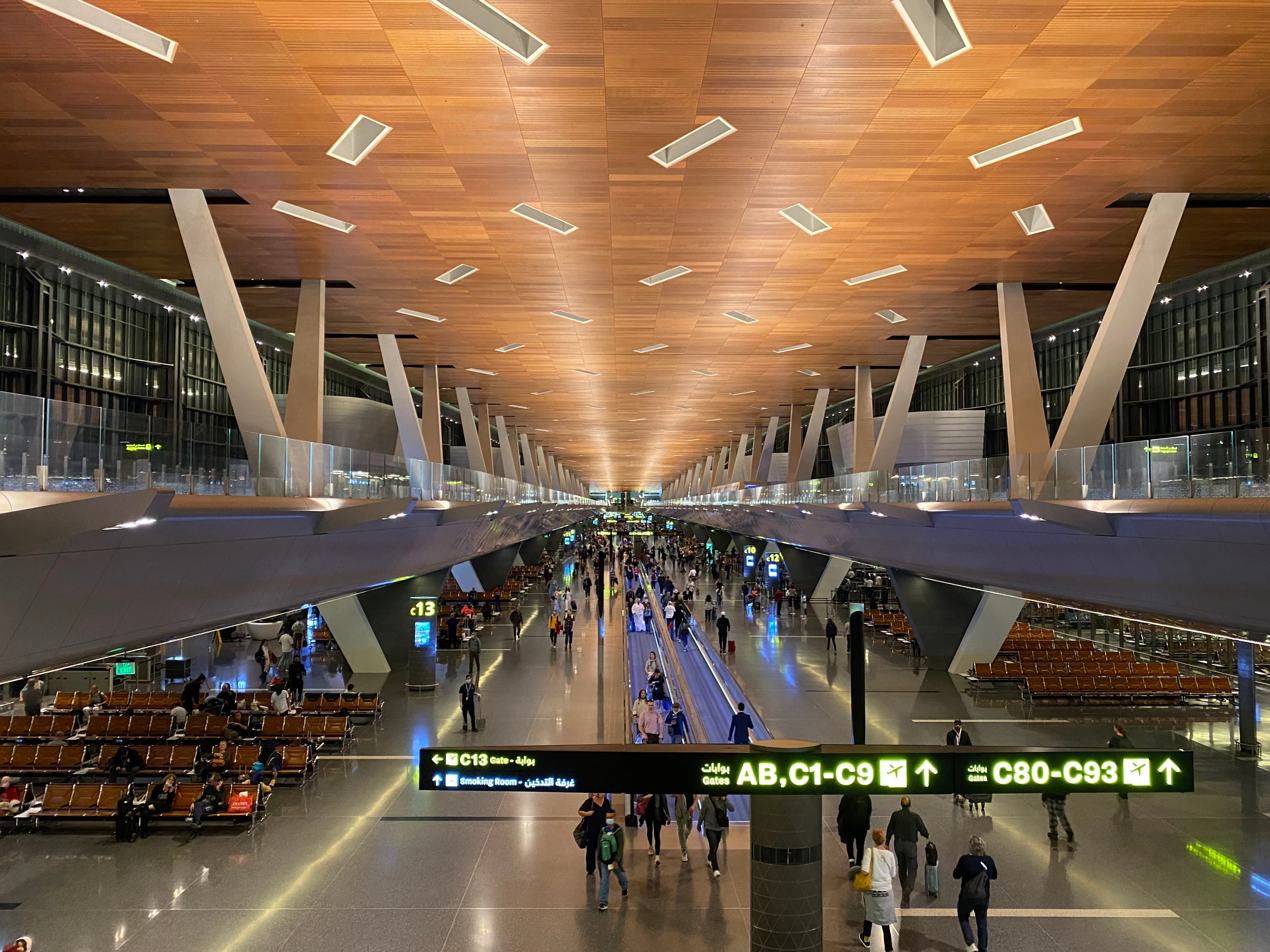
Interior of Concourse C

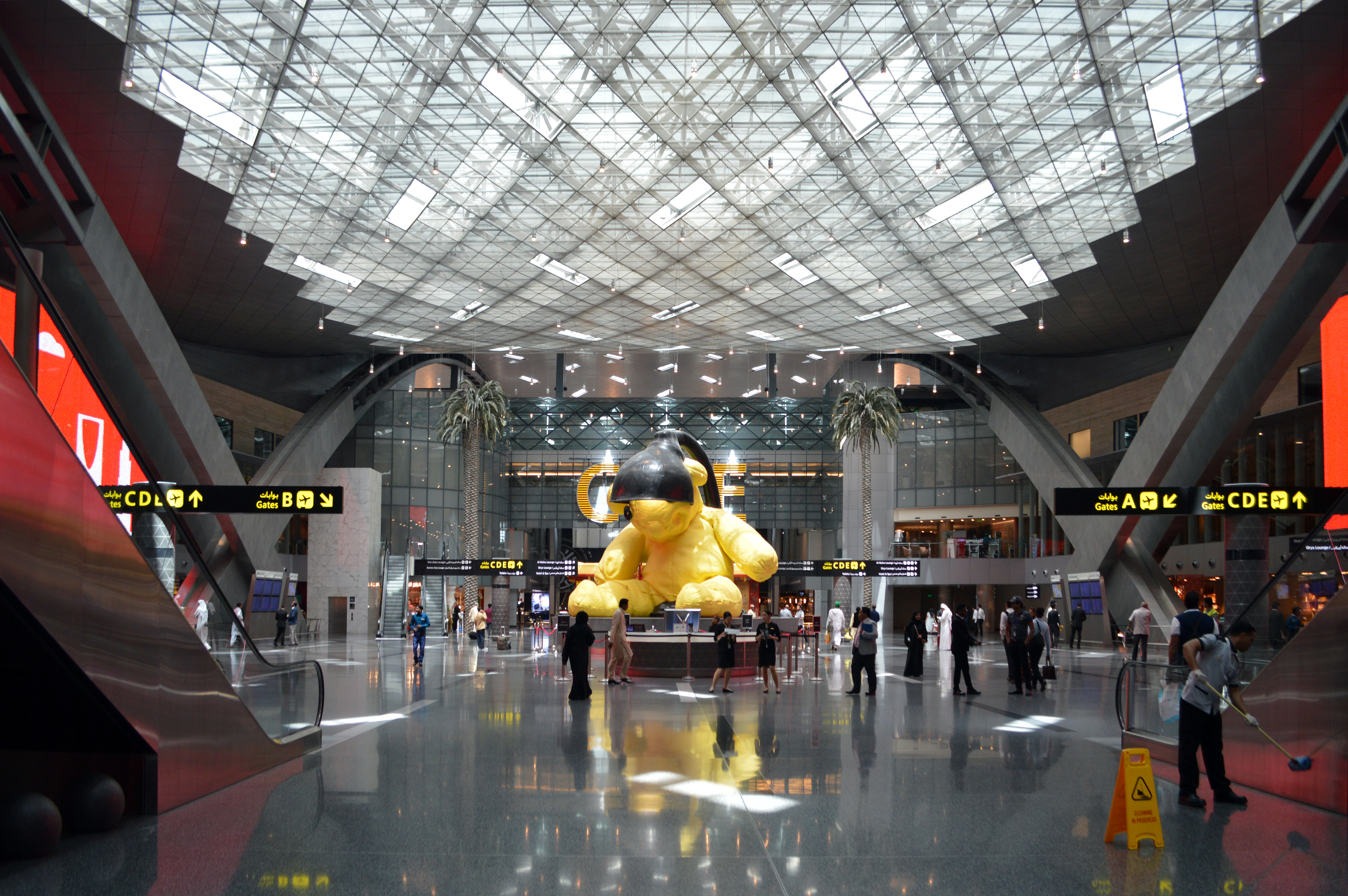
"Lamp Bear" in the grand foyer

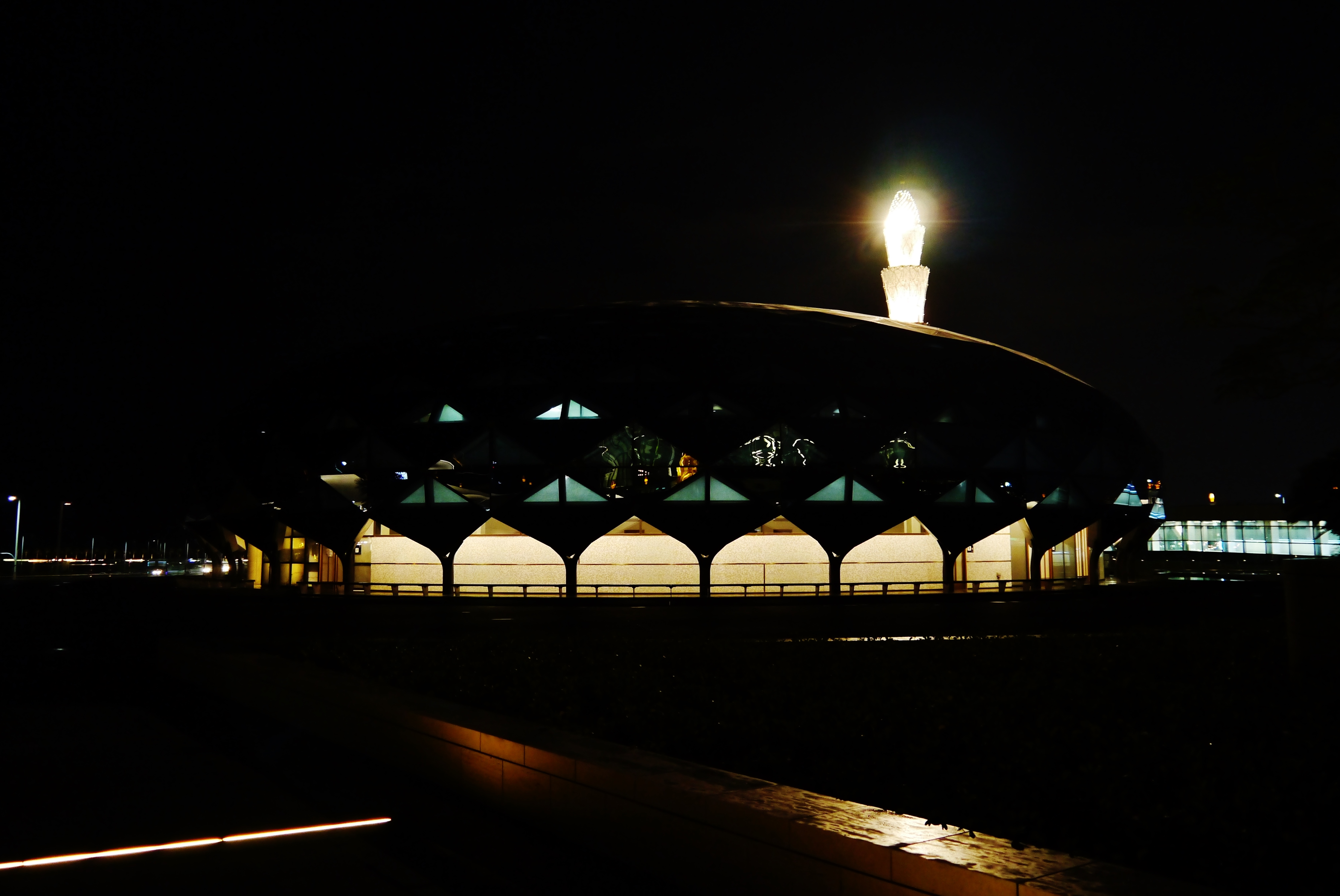
The mosque with minaret at night

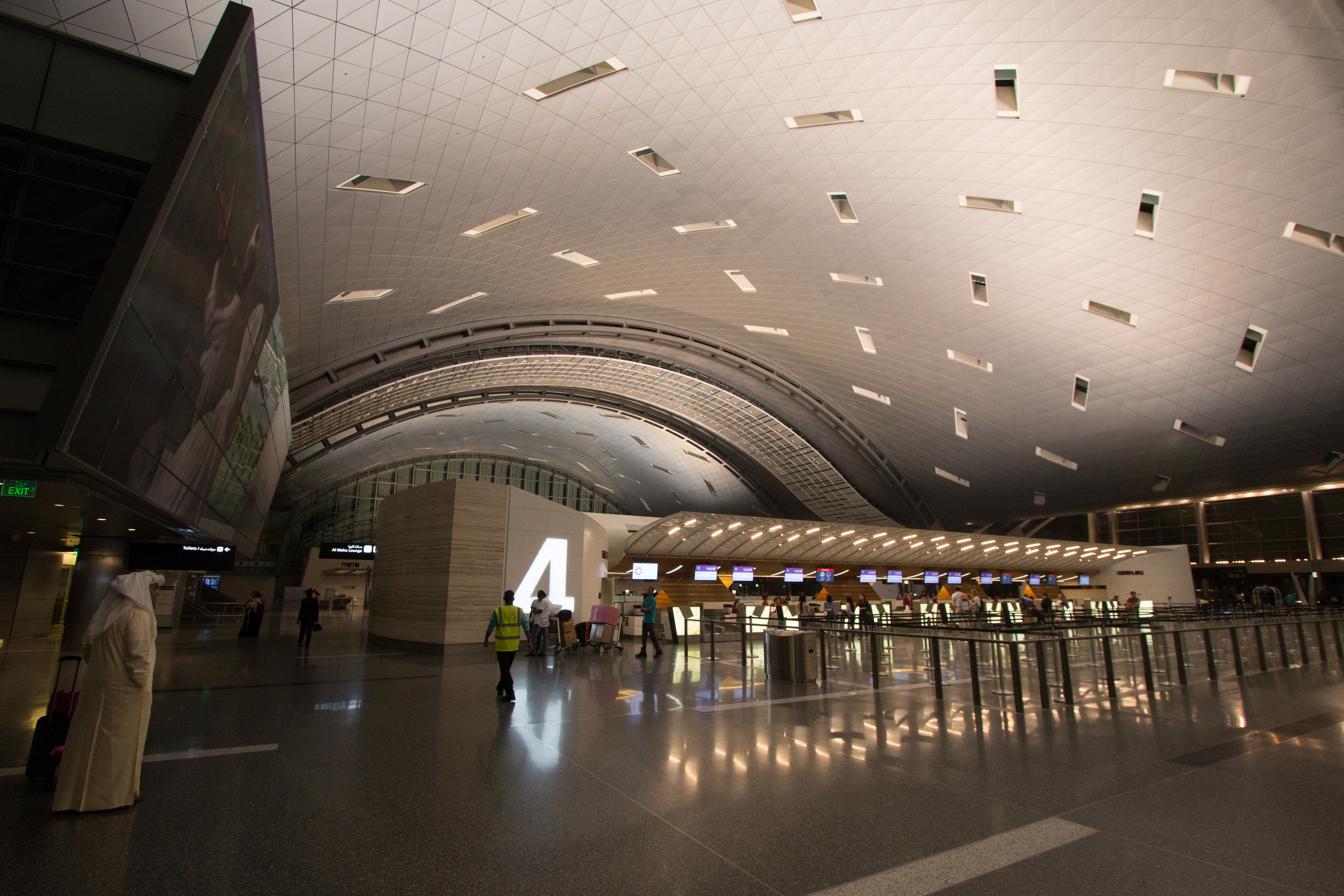
Check-in counter 4

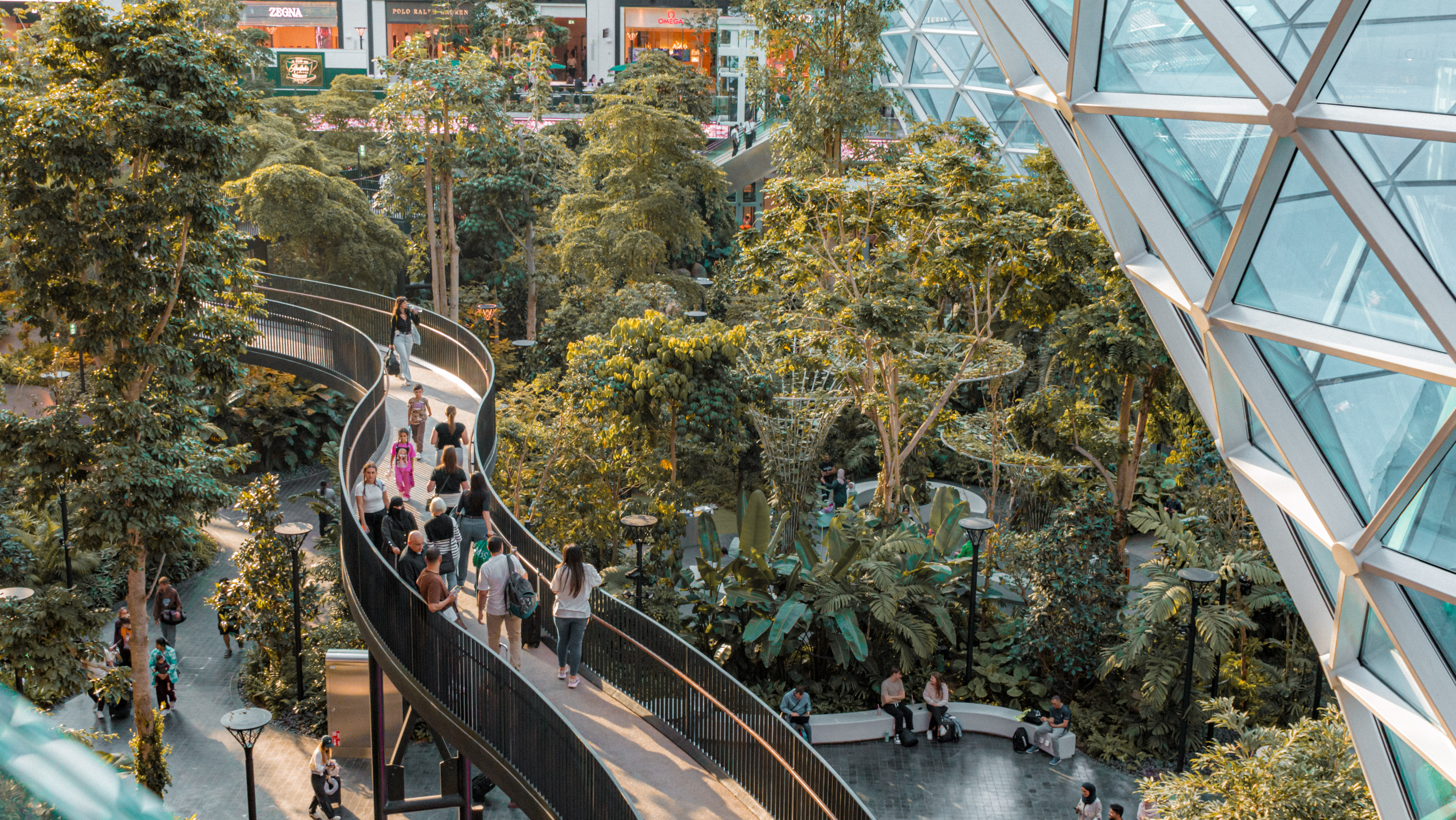
Walking path through ‘The Orchard’

== Airlines and destinations ==
=== Passenger ===
The following airlines operate regular scheduled and charter flights to and from Doha:

Airlines	Destinations
Air Algerie	Algiers
Air Arabia	Sharjah
Air Astana	Seasonal charter: Almaty, Astana, Şymkent
Air India	Delhi–Indira Gandhi, Mumbai–Shivaji
Air India Express	Kannur, Kochi, Kozhikode, Mangaluru, Thiruvananthapuram, Tiruchirappalli
Air Samarkand	Tashkent
Akasa Air	Mumbai
Ariana Afghan Airlines	Kabul
Badr Airlines	Port Sudan
Belavia	Seasonal charter: Brest
BH Air	Seasonal charter: Sofia
Biman Bangladesh Airlines	Chattogram, Dhaka, Sylhet
British Airways	London–Heathrow
Centrum Air	Tashkent
China Southern Airlines	Beijing–Daxing, Guangzhou
Egyptair	Cairo
Ethiopian Airlines	Addis Ababa
Etihad Airways	Abu Dhabi
Flydubai	Dubai–International
Flynas	Jeddah, Riyadh
FlyOne	Seasonal charter: Yerevan
Georgian Airways	Tbilisi
Gulf Air	Bahrain
Himalaya Airlines	Kathmandu
Iberia	Madrid (resumes 28 March 2027)
IndiGo	Bengaluru, Chennai, Delhi–Indira Gandhi, Hyderabad, Kannur, Kochi, Mumbai–Shivaji
Iran Air	Bandar Abbas, Lar, Shiraz
Japan Airlines	Tokyo–Haneda (resumes 28 March 2027)
Jazeera Airways	Kuwait City
Kam Air	Kabul
Kuwait Airways	Kuwait City
Malaysia Airlines	Kuala Lumpur–International
Middle East Airlines	Beirut
Nepal Airlines	Kathmandu
Oman Air	Muscat
Pakistan International Airlines	Islamabad, Lahore, Peshawar, Sialkot
Pegasus Airlines	Istanbul–Sabiha Gökçen
Philippine Airlines	Manila
Qatar Airways	Abha, Abidjan, Abu Dhabi, Abuja, Accra, Adelaide, Addis Ababa, Ahmedabad, Aleppo, Alexandria, Algiers, Almaty, Al Ula, Amman–Queen Alia, Amritsar, Amsterdam, Ankara, Athens, Atlanta, Auckland, Baghdad, Bahrain, Baku, Bangkok–Suvarnabhumi, Barcelona, Basra, Beijing–Daxing, Beirut, Belgrade, Bengaluru, Berlin, Birmingham, Bogota, Boston, Brisbane, Brussels, Bucharest–Otopeni, Budapest, Cairo, Canberra, Cape Town, Caracas, Casablanca, Cebu, Chengdu–Tianfu, Chennai, Chicago–O'Hare, Chongqing, Clark, Colombo–Bandaranaike, Copenhagen, Dallas/Fort Worth, Damascus, Dammam, Dar es Salaam, Davao, Delhi–Indira Gandhi, Denpasar, Dhaka, Djibouti, Dubai–International, Dublin, Durban, Düsseldorf, Edinburgh, Entebbe, Erbil, Faisalabad, Frankfurt, Gassim, Geneva, Goa–Mopa, Guangzhou, Ha'il, Hamburg, Hangzhou, Hanoi, Harare, Helsinki, Ho Chi Minh City, Hong Kong, Houston–Intercontinental, Hyderabad, Islamabad, Istanbul, Istanbul–Sabiha Gökçen, Jakarta–Soekarno-Hatta, Jeddah, Johannesburg–O.R. Tambo, Kano, Karachi, Kathmandu, Kigali, Kilimanjaro, Kinshasa–N'djili, Kochi, Kolkata, Kozhikode, Kuala Lumpur–International, Kuwait City, Lagos, Lahore, Larnaca, Lisbon, London–Gatwick, London–Heathrow, Los Angeles, Luanda, Lusaka, Madrid, Mahé, Málaga, Malé, Malta, Manchester, Manila, Maputo, Marrakesh, Mashhad, Medina, Melbourne, Miami, Milan–Malpensa, Mogadishu, Montréal–Trudeau, Moscow–Sheremetyevo, Multan, Mumbai–Shivaji, Munich, Muscat, Nagpur, Nairobi–Jomo Kenyatta, Najaf, Neom Bay (resumes 1 April 2027), New York–JFK, Nice, Osaka–Kansai, Oslo, Paris–Charles de Gaulle, Perth, Peshawar, Philadelphia, Phnom Penh, Phuket, Port Harcourt, Port Sudan, Prague, Red Sea, Riyadh, Rome–Fiumicino, Salalah, San Francisco, São Paulo–Guarulhos, Seattle/Tacoma, Seoul–Incheon, Shanghai–Pudong, Sharjah, Shiraz, Sialkot, Singapore, Stockholm–Arlanda, Sulaymaniah, Sydney–Kingsford Smith, Sydney–Western (begins 15 December 2027), Tabuk (resumes 3 January 2027), Taif, Tashkent, Tbilisi, Tehran–Imam Khomeini, Thiruvananthapuram, Tokyo–Haneda, Tokyo–Narita, Toronto–Pearson, Tunis, Venice, Vienna, Warsaw–Chopin, Washington–Dulles, Yanbu (resumes 2 January 2027), Yerevan, Zagreb, Zanzibar, Zurich; Seasonal: Antalya, Bodrum, Mykonos, Penang, Trabzon
Royal Air Maroc	Casablanca
Royal Jordanian	Amman–Queen Alia
RwandAir	Kigali
SalamAir	Muscat
Saudia	Jeddah, Riyadh
Shenzhen Airlines	Shenzhen
Smartwings	Seasonal charter: Prague
SriLankan Airlines	Colombo–Bandaranaike
Syrian Air	Aleppo, Damascus
Tarco Aviation	Port Sudan
Turkish Airlines	Istanbul
Ural Airlines	Seasonal charter: Yekaterinburg
US-Bangla Airlines	Chattogram, Dhaka
Virgin Australia	Brisbane, Melbourne, Perth, Sydney–Kingsford Smith
XiamenAir	Beijing–Daxing, Xiamen

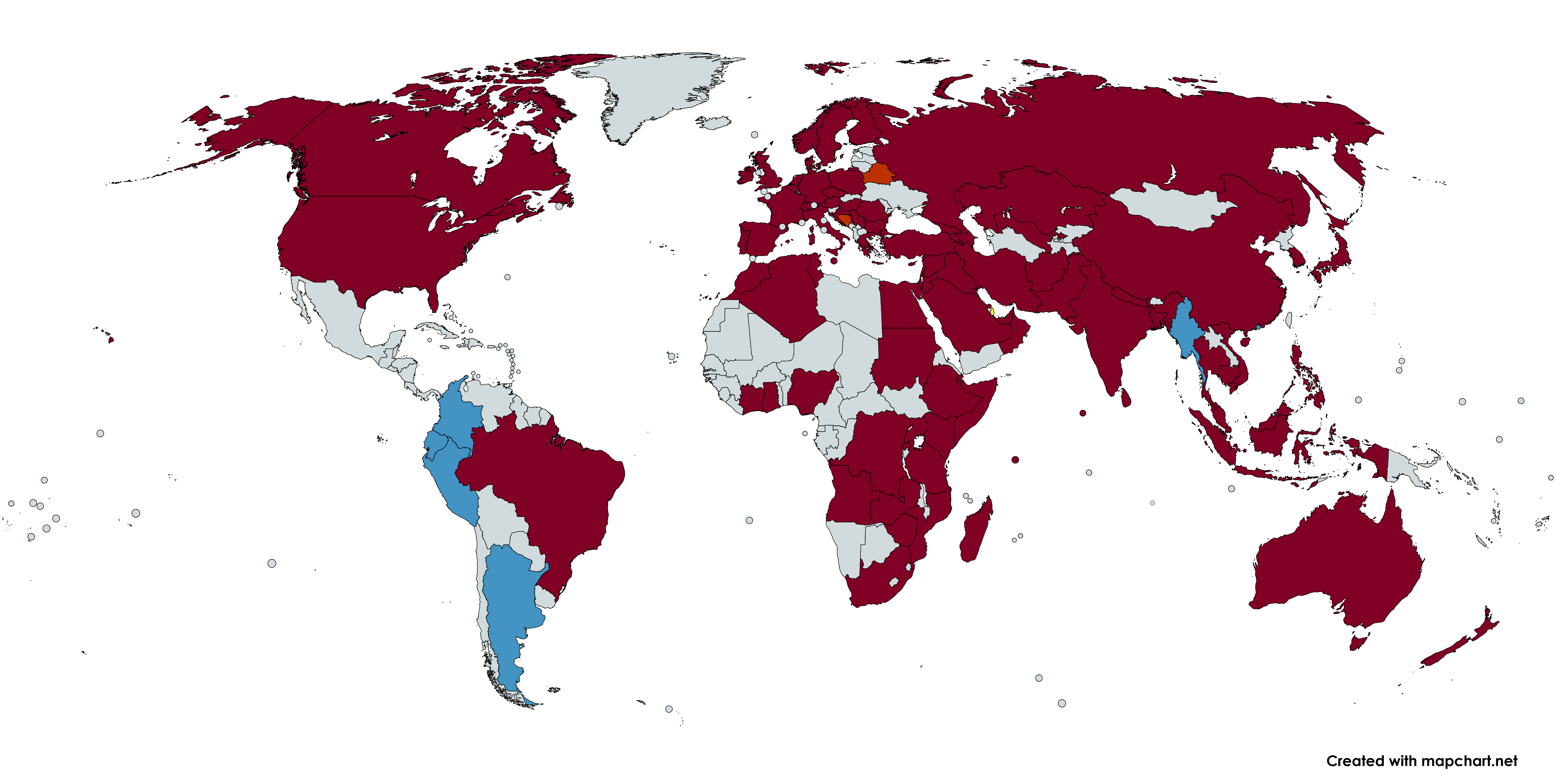
Hamad International Airport – Destination Map (February 2026). Maroon shows regularly connected countries with both passenger and cargo operations. Yellow shows Qatar, where the airport is located. Light blue shows cargo-only countries. Orange shows Belarus and Bosnia and Herzegovina, which are seasonally connected.

== Ground transport ==
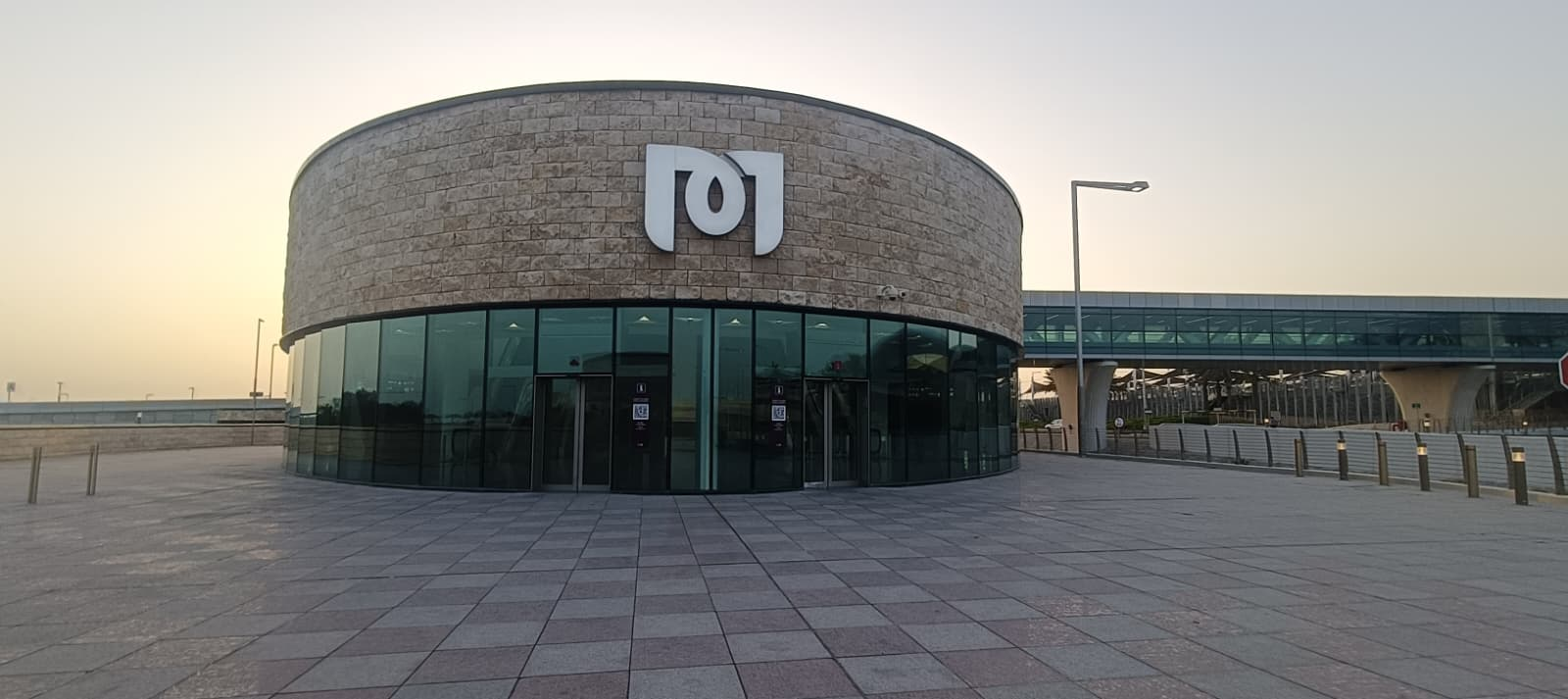
Doha Metro Station at Hamad International Airport

=== Metro ===
The airport has a metro station at Terminal 1 on the Red Line of Doha Metro, connecting it directly with Downtown Doha.

=== Bus ===
The passenger terminal is additionally connected to its nearby surroundings by four regional bus lines, of which one (757) also runs towards Downtown Doha.

== Controversies ==
=== Forced examinations of women passengers ===
On 2 October 2020, a newborn was found abandoned in a bin. In response to this, the authorities ordered women of childbearing age from 10 planes to disembark and undergo a forced vaginal examination. The Qatari Prime Minister issued an apology and ordered an investigation. The Australian government "registered its strong disapproval and outrage" at the treatment of Australian women who were subjected to compulsory intimate medical examinations at Doha airport. On 30 October 2020, a report by The Guardian noted the apology of the Qatari government, which said that those "responsible for these violations and illegal actions" had been referred to the public prosecution office, offering “the sincerest apology for what some female travellers went through as a result of the measures", adding "While the urgently decided search aimed to prevent the perpetrators of the horrible crime from escaping, the state of Qatar regrets any distress or infringement on the personal freedoms of any traveller caused by this action." As of the beginning of 2021, none of the women who were searched have been contacted by the Qatari authorities; subsequently, five Australian women launched legal action against Qatar Airways and two other government bodies over the incident in late 2021. The Federal Court of Australia dismissed the case in April 2024, after finding that the searches did not happen on board a Qatar Airways aircraft nor were carried out by the airline's employees. Following ongoing backlash, in September 2023, Qatar Airways' senior vice-president of global sales Matt Raos asserted during an Australian Senate inquiry that the 2020 incident was "a one-off and an isolated incident".

=== Slave labor ===
An investigation by the Human Rights Watch (HRW), as well as the International Trade Union Confederation (ITUC), concluded that slave labour was significantly used in constructing Hamad International Airport.

== See also ==
- Transport in Qatar
- List of airports in Qatar
- List of the busiest airports in the Middle East
