= Hamad International Airport T1 station =

Metro station in Qatar

Hamad International Airport T1 metro station محطة مترو مطار حمد الدولي المبنى 1
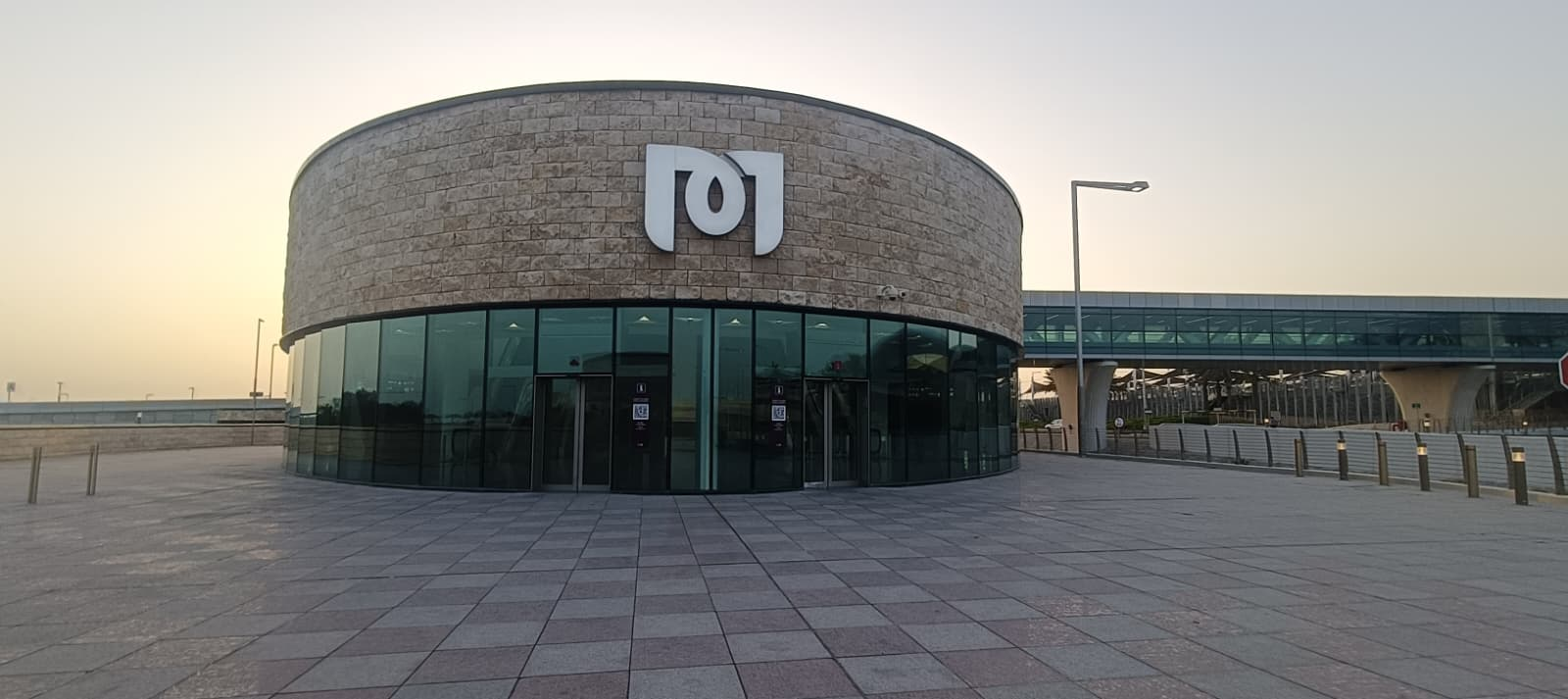

General information
- Location: Hamad International Airport Terminal 1, Doha; Qatar
- Coordinates: 25.2567°N 51.6149°E
- Owner: Qatar Rail
- Operator: Doha Metro
- Platforms: 2
- Tracks: 2

Construction
- Structure type: Underground
- Parking: Yes
- Accessible: Yes

Other information
- Website: http://www.qr.com.qa/

History
- Opened: 8 May 2019

Services
Preceding station	Doha Metro	Following station
Oqba Ibn Nafie towards Lusail	Red Line	Terminus
Location

Hamad International Airport T1 station is on Doha Metro's Red Line and serves Terminal 1 of Hamad International Airport in Doha, Qatar.

== History ==
The station was opened to the public on 8 May 2019 along with 12 other Red Line stations.
