= Lusail Tram =

Tram network in Lusail, Qatar

Overview
- Owner: Qatar Rail
- Locale: Lusail, Qatar
- Transit type: Light rail
- Number of lines: 3 (operational); 1 (under construction)
- Number of stations: 21 (operational); 4 (under construction)
- Website: Qatar Rail

Operation
- Began operation: January 1, 2022
- Operators: RKH Qitarat (Hamad/Keolis-RATP Dev)
- Number of vehicles: 35 Alstom Citadis

Technical
- System length: 15.9 km (9.9 mi) (operational); 25 km (16 mi) (total)
- Track gauge: 1,435 mm (4 ft 8 1/2 in)

Lusail Tram (Arabic: ترام لوسيل), is a light rail network serving the city of Lusail, Qatar.

== Background ==
The Lusail Tram was initially aimed at enhancing connectivity between key areas during the 2022 World Cup, but is now rapidly becoming a part of the city's transportation network. The tram network consists of two lines and with another two being planned. The first preview of its first phase was on 1 January 2022, with the preview of the Orange Line, which had six original underground air-conditioned stations with future expansions planned to be gradually opened to the public. The light rail network will feature 10.4 km (6.5 mi) of underground tracks and 22.7 km (14.1 mi) of surface and elevated tracks, including a 0.5 km (0.31 mi) section between two high-rise buildings. It will consist of approximately 8 km (5.0 mi) of single track and 25 km (16 mi) of double track, with 37 new passenger stations.

Lusail Tram will also be connected to the Doha Metro, a rapid transit operator in the Doha region in the future. Lusail Metro –a station on Doha's Red Line– is set to be connected to the future Purple Line of the system, while Leqtaifiya Metro, is already connected to Leqtaifya station of the Pink and Orange lines, which opened on 8 April 2024. Existing Doha Metro Travel Cards will allow passengers to seamlessly connect between the tram network and Doha Metro.

The Lusail Tram will be operated and maintained for 20 years by RKH Qitarat, a joint venture formed by Hamad Group (51%) and French transit operators Keolis and RATP Dev (49%), on behalf of system owner Qatar Rail. It uses a fleet of 35 Alstom Citadis trams.

== History ==
Construction of the Lusail Tram began with the design phase in August 2007. The first phase, featuring a six-station stretch of the Orange Line, opened to the public on January 1, 2022. The network now includes 25 stations across four lines: Orange, Pink, Turquoise, and Purple. Currently, the Orange, Pink and Turquoise Lines are operational, while the Purple Line is still being planned and under construction.

The Lusail tramway project is being developed by QDVC, a joint venture between Qatari Diar (51%) and Vinci Construction Grands Projets (49%). The contract for this project was awarded in August 2011 and officially signed on June 23, 2014, in Paris, with notable attendees including French President François Hollande, Emir Sheikh Tamim bin Hamad Al Thani, and Patrick Kron, Chairman and CEO of Alstom.

By January 2018, Qatar Rail announced that the project was 71% complete, with the first train having left the factory. The tramway was slated for commissioning in 2020.

== Rolling stock ==
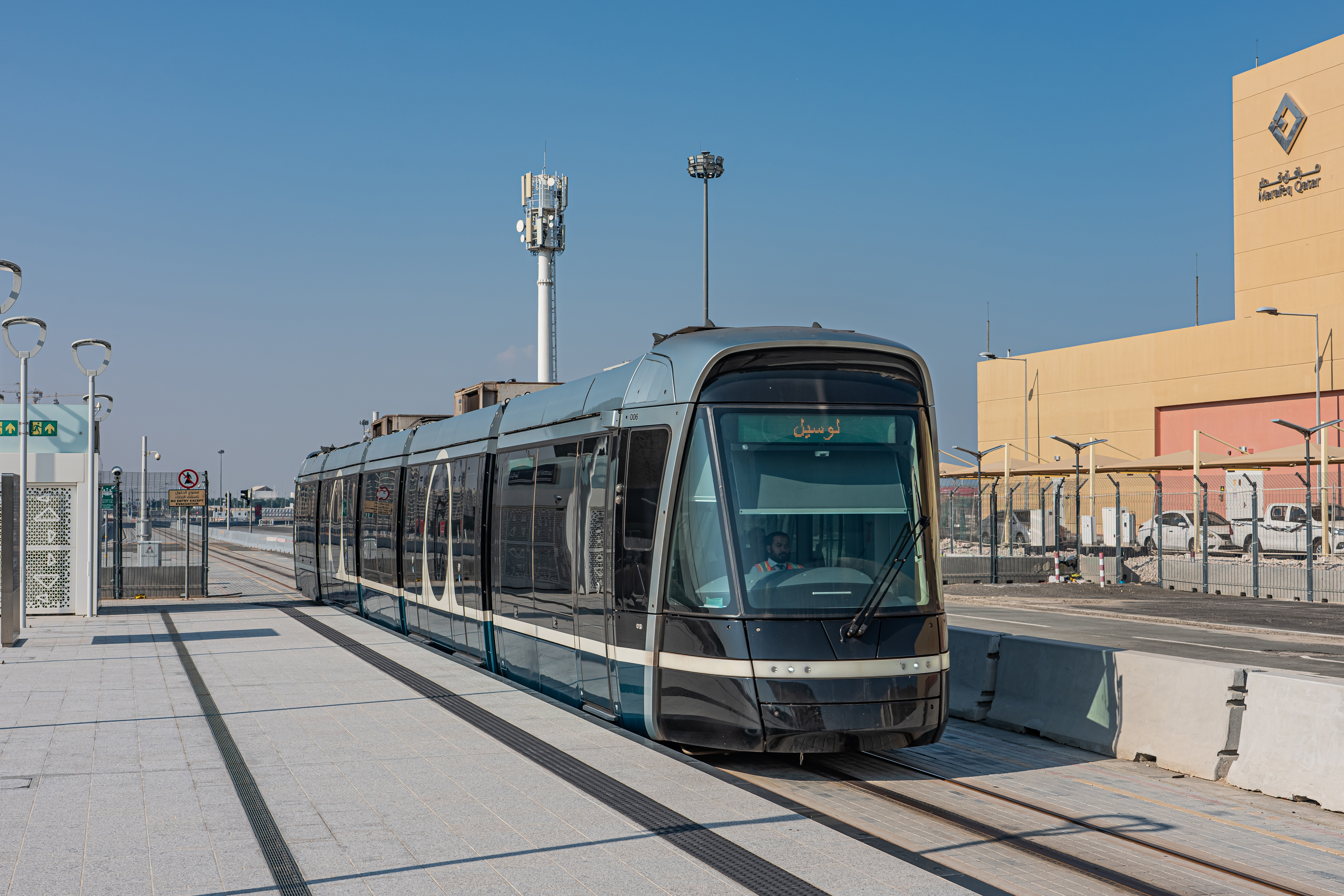
Train exterior

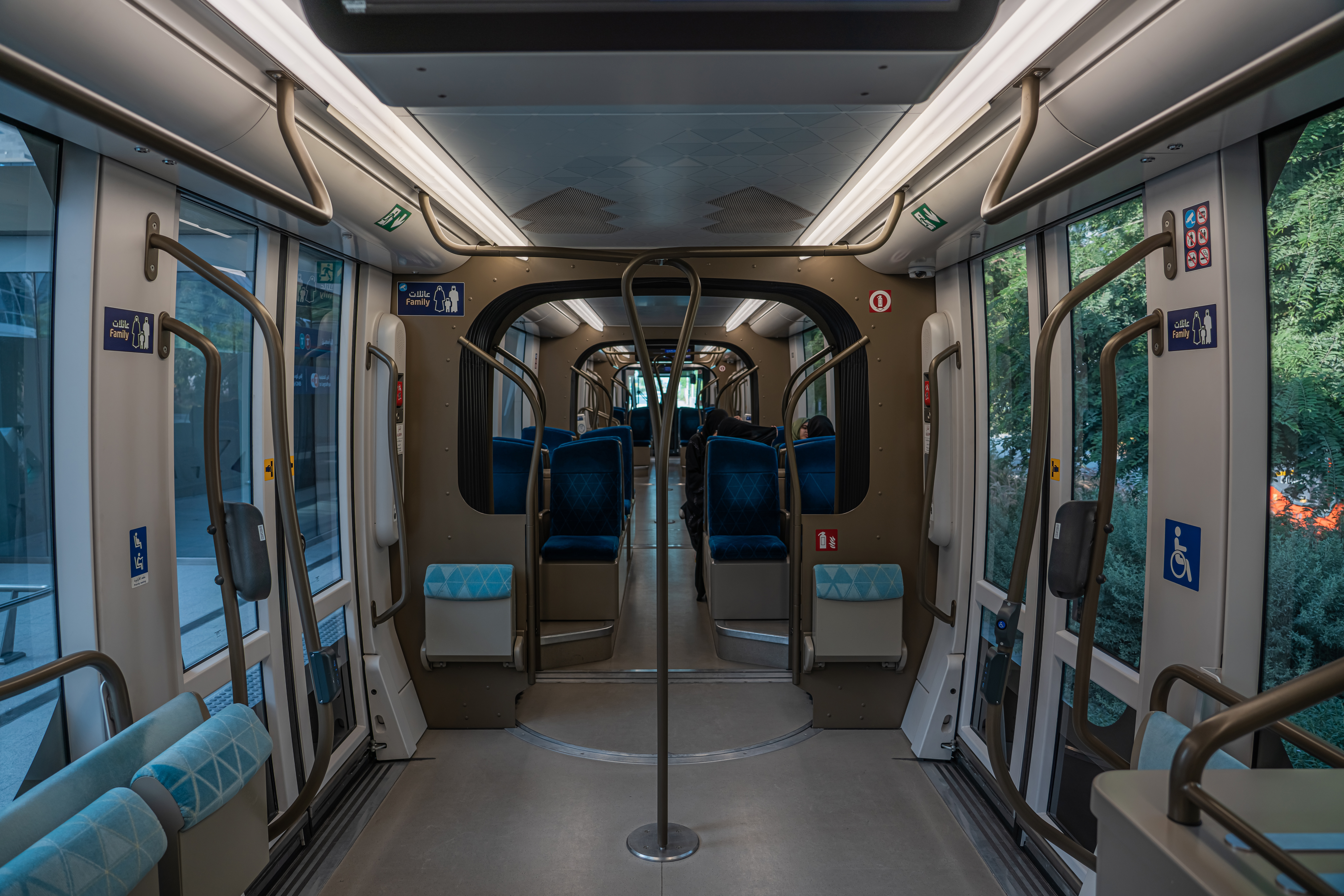
Train interior

The Lusail tram is equipped with 35 Citadis 305 trainsets assembled by Alstom at its plants in Aytré, near La Rochelle, France, and Barcelona, Spain. The trains are 32 m (105 ft) long, have APS equipment and have a capacity of 207 passengers.

The design of the vehicles, whose front side resembles the bow of a ship, is inspired by the dhows of ships originating in the region. The interior design is made up of the architectural elements of the region, with touches of yellow that are reminiscent of the Lusail flower.

=== Free transfer to Metroexpress ===
Metroexpress, owned by Qatar Rail, is a complementary ride-sharing feeder service that connects specific service tram stations in Lusail and the broader Doha region. The service uses a fleet of branded vans with a seating capacity of 7 passengers per vehicle.

== Station Designs ==
Lusail tram stations draw their design inspiration from Qatar’s rich heritage. According to the official metro station account, the interiors of these stations are deeply influenced by local Qatari traditions and historical legacy.

Intricate patterns were derived from gypsum engravings used in local houses, majlis and palaces. Also, textures of clay used in historical fortresses, towers, souqs were reflected on walls and floors of the stations while vintage geometrical ornaments are used as decor.

The design also features elements of ‘Al Mehmel’, a traditional Qatar dhow used for pearl fishing. Interiors of the carriages will include vintage elements to resonate with the overall aesthetic.

== Contract ==
The tender for the operation and maintenance of the Lusail Tramway was launched by Qatar Rail in May 2015. The two French automated metro operators, Keolis and RATP Dev, applied together as part of a consortium. The other pre-qualified candidates were Arriva/DB International GmbH, West Japan Railway Company/Mitsubishi, MTR Corporation (Hong Kong Metro), Serco and Transdev. In the end, Keolis and RATP Dev won the match, under a 20-year contract signed on 7 December 2017 in Doha between Qatar Rail and RKH Qitarat, the joint venture formed by Hamad Group (51%) and Keolis-RATP Dev (49%). The contract was signed during a meeting between the President of the French Republic, Emmanuel Macron, and Emir Sheikh Tamim bin Hamad Al Thani.

== Fares ==
Using the tram requires a travel card, which is a rechargeable plastic card available for 10 Qatari riyal (QR). This card can be purchased on every station of the system and can also be used on the Doha Metro.

The fare for the Lusail Tram is 2 QR for a single trip. 6 QR day passes that allows unlimited trips on both the Lusail Tram and the Doha Metro are also available.

== Timing ==
=== Regular Timing ===
Lusail Tram operates daily, following Doha Metro's timetable. From Saturday to Wednesday, it runs from 5:30 AM to midnight. On Thursdays, the service extends until 1:00 AM, and on Fridays, it operates from 2:00 PM to 1:00 AM.

=== Ramadan Timing ===
Beginning on the first day of Ramadan, the service hours for the Lusail Tram and Doha Metro will be extended. Qatar Rail will operate the metro and tram from 6 am on Saturdays to 1 am on Thursdays. On Fridays, the service will start at 2 pm and continue until 1 am.

== Lines and stations ==
=== Orange Line ===
The Orange Line, which partially opened on 1 January 2022, shares tracks with the Pink Line from Legtaifiya, which is also a station on the Doha Metro, to Tarfat - South before branching west. At Naifa, it begins a unidirectional, counterclockwise loop, sharing tracks with the future Turquoise Line, before returning to Naifa and back to Legtaifiya. On 8 April 2024, the remainder of the Orange Line was opened, which consisted of the loop around the city.

Station name		Transfers	Opening date
English	Arabic	Transfers	Opening date
Legtaifiya	لقطيفية	PK	1 January 2022
Marina - South station	مارينا - الجنوب	PK	1 January 2022
Marina - Central	مارينا - سنترال	PK	1 January 2022
Yacht Club	ونادي اليخوت	PK	1 January 2022
Marina - North	مارينا - الشمال	PK	1 January 2022
Tarfat - South	طرفات - الجنوب	PK	9 April 2022
Al Wessil (Note: formerly Energy City South)	ومدينة الطاقة جنوب		1 January 2022
Naifa	نايفة		8 April 2024
Fox Hills – South	فوكس هيلز – الجنوب		8 April 2024
Crescent Junction	كريسنت بارك – الشمال		8 April 2024
Downtown Lusail	وسط مدينة لوسيل		8 April 2024
Al Khayl Street	شارع الخي		8 April 2024
Fox Hills – North	فوكس هيلز – الشمال		8 April 2024
Crescent Park – North	كريسنت بارك – الشمال		8 April 2024
Rawdat Lusail	روضة لوسيل		8 April 2024
Erkiyah	اركيا		8 April 2024
Lusail Stadium	محطة استاد لوسيل		8 April 2024
Al Yasmeen	الياسمين		8 April 2024

=== Pink Line ===
The Pink Line, which opened on 8 April 2024, shares the tracks with the Orange Line from Legtaifiya, (which offers transfers to the Doha Metro), to Tarfat - South heading straight towards Seef Lusail - North. The first phase includes 10 stations with more planned.

Station name		Transfers	Opening date
English	Arabic	Transfers	Opening date
Legtaifiya	لقطيفية	OR	1 January 2022
Marina - South	مارينا - الجنوب	OR	1 January 2022
Marina - Central	مارينا - سنترال	OR	1 January 2022
Yacht Club	ونادي اليخوت	OR	1 January 2022
Marina - North	مارينا - الشمال	OR	1 January 2022
Tarfat - South	طرفات - الجنوب	OR	9 April 2022
Tarfat - North	طرفات - الشمال		8 April 2024
Wadi	واد		8 April 2024
Seef Lusail - South	سيف لوسيل - الجنوب		8 April 2024
Seef Lusail - North	سيف لوسيل - الشمال		9 April 2022

=== Turquoise Line ===
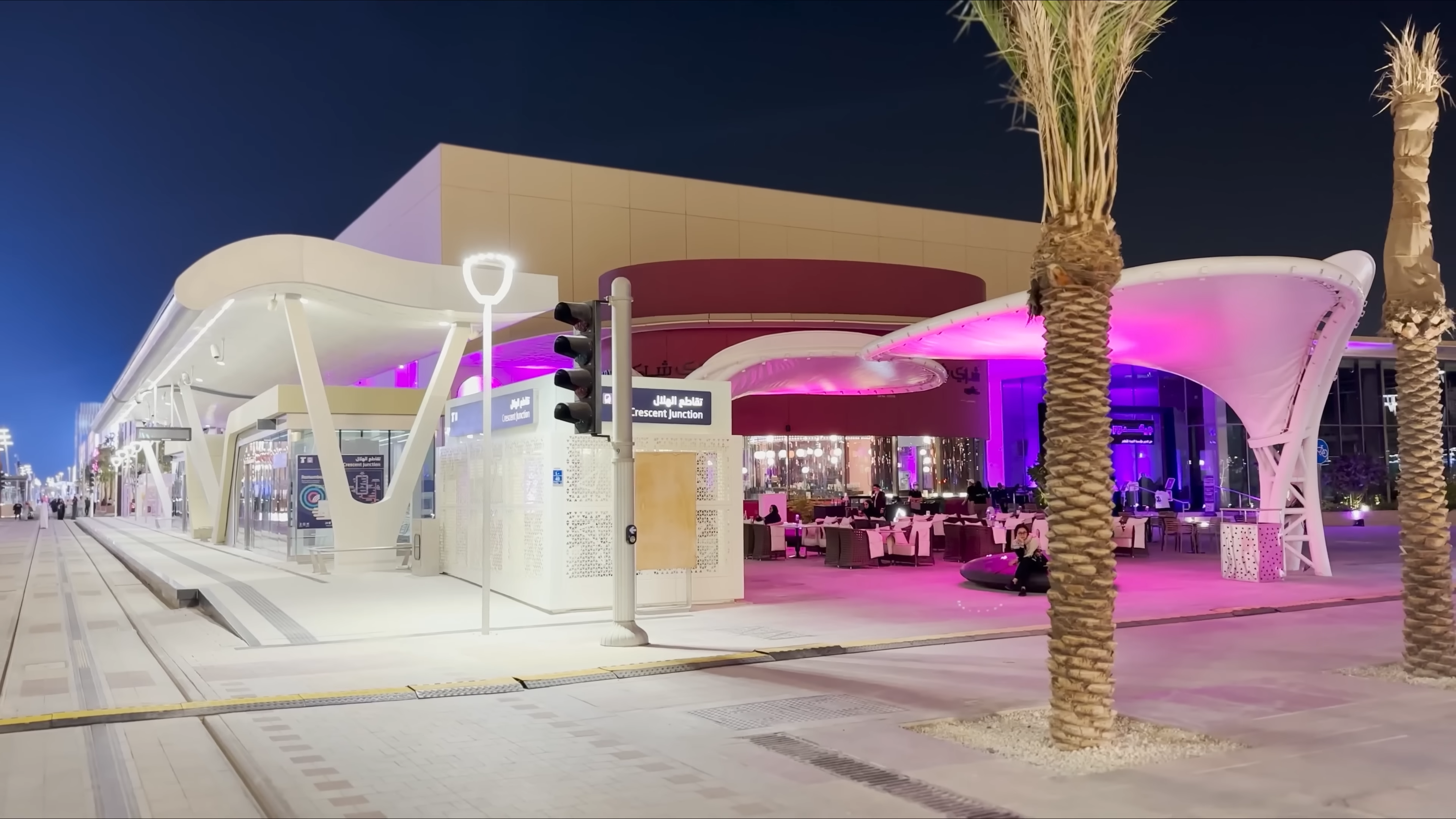
Crescent Junction tram station

Opened on 6 January 2025, the Turquoise Line is a clockwise loop line which goes around parts of the city's central district. The line starts at Rawdat Lusail before heading clockwise to the station again, passing locations such as Lusail Stadium.

Station name		Transfers	Opening date
English	Arabic	Transfers	Opening date
Rawdat Lusail	روضة لوسيل	OR	
Erkiyah	اركيا	OR	
Lusail Stadium	محطة استاد لوسيل	OR	
Al Yasmeen	الياسمين	OR	
Fox Hills - South	فوكس هيلز – الجنوب	OR	
Crescent Junction	كريسنت بارك – الشمال	OR PP	
Fox Hills - North	فوكس هيلز – الشمال	OR	
Downtown Lusail	وسط مدينة لوسيل	OR	
Crescent Park – North	كريسنت بارك – الشمال	OR	
Rawdat Lusail	روضة لوسيل	OR	

== Lines under construction ==
=== Purple Line ===
The Purple Line is an under construction east-west line that will go through the city center. Starting at Lusail Station, which is also connected to Doha Metro, the line will head east towards Seef Lusail South.

Station name		Transfers	Opening date
English	Arabic	Transfers	Opening date
Lusail Station	المنازل	Red Line (Doha Metro)	
Grand Masjed	الاركية		
Lusail Boulevard	ألفان واثنان وعشرون		
Downtown Lusail	مدينة الطاقة الشمالية	OR TQ	
Al Sa'ad Plaza	سيف لوسيل - الجنوب	PK	
