= Red Line (Doha Metro) =

Rapid transit line in Doha, Qatar

Overview
- Other name: Coastal Line
- Native name: الخط الأحمر
- Status: Operating
- Owner: Government of Qatar
- Locale: Doha, Qatar
- Termini: Lusail; Hamad International Airport T1; Al Wakra
- Stations: 18

Service
- Type: Rapid transit
- System: Doha Metro
- Services: Lusail ↔ Hamad International Airport T1; Lusail ↔ Al Wakra
- Operator(s): Qatar Rail
- Rolling stock: Mitsubishi Corporation and Kinki Sharyo

History
- Opened: 8 May 2019

Technical
- Line length: 40 km (25 mi)
- Character: Underground, Elevated, At-Grade
- Track gauge: 1,435 mm (4 ft 8 1/2 in) standard gauge
- Electrification: 750 V DC third rail

The Red Line is a rapid transit line of the Doha Metro in Qatar. It runs north-south through Doha, from its southern terminus at Al Wakrah to its northern terminus at Lusail, with a spur serving Hamad International Airport. It was the first line of the system, with the first segment opened on 8 May 2019.

== Operation ==
At first, the line was only open from 8:00 AM to 11:00 PM Sunday–Thursday. Later, it added weekend hours of 2:00 PM – 11:00 PM on Friday and 6:00 AM – 11:00 PM on Saturday, and also extended the weekday timings to 6:00 AM – 11:00 PM. It now runs on all days except Friday from 6:00 AM to 11:00 PM, and from 2:00 PM to 1:00 AM on Fridays.

== Stations ==
| Station name | | Transfers | Opening date |
| English | Arabic | Transfers | Opening date |
|---|---|---|---|
| Lusail | لوسيل | Lusail Tram Turquoise Line and Purple Line (u/c) | 10 December 2019 |
| Qatar University | جامعة قطر | | 10 December 2019 |
| Legtaifiya | لقطيفية | Lusail Tram Orange Line and Pink Line | 2 September 2020 |
| Katara | كتارا | | 10 December 2019 |
| Al Qassar | القصار | | 8 May 2019 |
| DECC | مركز المعارض | | 8 May 2019 |
| West Bay | الخليج الغربي | | 8 May 2019 |
| Corniche | الكورنيش | | 8 May 2019 |
| Al Bidda | البدع | Green Line (Doha Metro) | 8 May 2019 |
| Msheireb | مشيرب | Green Line (Doha Metro) Gold Line (Doha Metro) | 8 May 2019 |
| Al Doha Al Jadeda | الدوحة الجديدة | | 8 May 2019 |
| Umm Ghuwailina | أم غويلينة | | 8 May 2019 |
| Al Matar Al Qadeem | المطار القديم | | 8 May 2019 |
| Oqba Ibn Nafie | عقبة بن نافع' | | 8 May 2019 |
| Hamad International Airport T1 | مطار حمد الدولي مبنى 1 | | 10 December 2019 |
| Free Zone | المنطقة الحرة | MetroLink Bus | 8 May 2019 |
| Ras Bu Fontas | راس بو فنطاس | MetroLink Bus | 8 May 2019 |
| Al Wakra | الوكرة | MetroLink Bus | 8 May 2019 |
