= Lusail station =

Metro station in Lusail, Qatar

Lusail metro station محطة مترو لوسيل
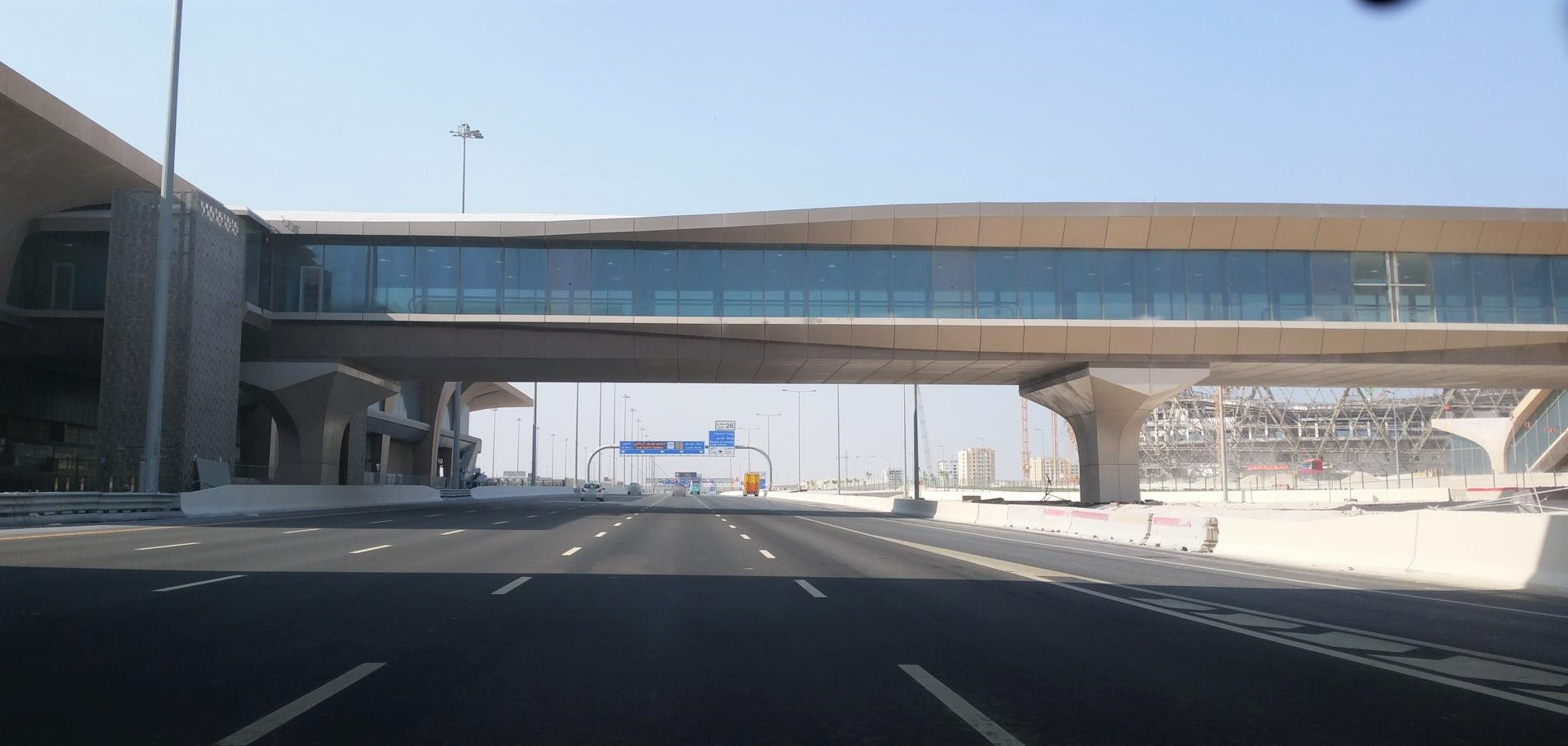

General information
- Location: Al Khor Coastal Road, Lusail; Qatar
- Coordinates: 25.41484°N 51.48817°E
- Owner: Qatar Rail
- Operator: Doha Metro
- Platforms: 1
- Tracks: 2

Construction
- Structure type: Elevated
- Parking: Yes
- Accessible: Yes

Other information
- Website: http://www.qr.com.qa/

History
- Opened: 10 December 2019

Services
Preceding station	Doha Metro	Following station
Terminus	Red Line	Qatar University towards Al Wakra or Hamad International Airport T1
Preceding station	Lusail Tram	Following station
Reverses direction	Turquoise Line transfer at Lusail QNB	Lusail Stadium One-way operation
Reverses direction	Turquoise Line transfer at Lusail QNB	Al Yasmeen towards Rawdat Lusail

Future services
Preceding station	Lusail Tram	Following station
Reverses direction	Turquoise Line transfer at Lusail QNB	Grand Masjed towards Rawdat Lusail
Terminus	Purple Line transfer at Lusail QNB	Grand Masjed towards Al Sa'ad Plaza
Location

Lusail QNB station, in Qatar, is the northern terminus of the Doha Metro's Red Line and serves the city of Lusail. The station is located on Al Khor Coastal Road. The naming rights to the station are currently held by QNB Group.

== History ==
The station was opened to the public on 10 December 2019 along with three other Red Line stations, over six months after the opening of the line's first 13 stations.

== Station facilities ==
Facilities in the station include a prayer room and restrooms.

== Connections ==
There is one connection, which is the Doha Metro's free feeder bus network, servicing the station:

- M145, which serves Doha Festival City in Umm Salal Municipality.
