= Al Wakra station =

Metro station in Doha, Qatar

Al Wakra الوكرة
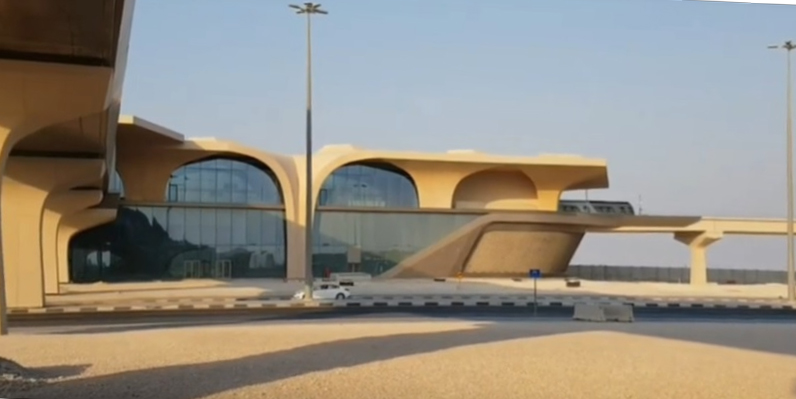

General information
- Location: Al Wakrah Road near intersection with Ras Bu Funtas Street; Qatar
- Coordinates: 25.19349°N 51.59601°E
- Owner: Qatar Rail
- Operator: Doha Metro
- Platforms: 1
- Tracks: 1
- Connections: MetroLink Bus

Construction
- Structure type: Elevated
- Parking: Yes
- Accessible: Yes

Other information
- Website: http://www.qr.com.qa/

History
- Opened: 8 May 2019

Services
Preceding station	Doha Metro	Following station
Ras Bu Fontas towards Lusail	Red Line	Terminus
Location

Al Wakra station (Arabic: الوكرة) is the southern terminus of the Doha Metro's Red Line in the Qatari capital Doha. It serves Al Wakrah Municipality, namely Al Wakrah City and Al Wukair.

== History ==
As part of the metro's Phase 1, the station was inaugurated on 8 May 2019, along with most other Red Line stations.

== Station details ==
Among the station's facilities are a Masraf Al Rayyan ATM, a Qatar National Bank ATM, a prayer room, restrooms and a car park.

== MetroLink Bus ==
MetroLink is the Doha Metro's free feeder bus network. There are a total of five metrolinks servicing the station:

- M127, which serves Souq Al Wakrah.
- M128, which serves Al Wakrah South.
- M130, which serves Ezdan Village 4-7 (Al Wukair).
- M131, which serves Ezdan Village 3 and 8–11 Al Wukair.
- M132, which serves Al Wukair South.
- M133, which serves Ezdan Mall, Al Wakrah Hospital and Ezdan 18, 21, 22, 23, 24.
- M134, which serves Al Wakrah South and Al Wakrah Hospital.
- M135, which serves Ezdan Oasis

== Connections ==
The station is served by bus routes 109, 119, and 129. However, the recent inauguration of Al Wakra bus depot has made some changes to the bus numbers which leave to and from the Al Wakra bus depot along with metrolink buses.
