= Desalination by country =

There are roughly 22,000 operational desalination plants, located across 177 countries, which generate an estimated 95 million m^{3}/day of fresh water to over 300 million people daily. Micro desalination plants operate near almost every natural gas or fracking facility in the United States. Furthermore, micro desalination facilities exist in textile, leather, food industries, etc.

As of December 7, 2023, Shoaiba Power and Desalination Plant, located on the Red Sea coast, managed by the Saline Water Conversion Corporation, holds the record for the highest production capacity globally, generating 2,998,000 cubic meters of desalinated water per day.

There are multiple types of water desalination systems but the two most used are thermal and membrane. Thermal systems use heat to evaporate the water, separating it from the salt and then condensing the steam to collect the fresh water. Membrane systems use high pressure to push the water through a series of sieves. The sieves membranes are big enough to allow the water to pass through but small enough to trap the salt, minerals and other impurities.

== Operating desalination plants ==
The following table is a list of operating desalination plants. Criteria for inclusion on this list include:

- that it's operating (not proposed or decommissioned), and
- has a capacity of at least 100,000 cubic meters per day or it's the largest in its country.
- excludes desalination plants used primarily for mining

Table of operating desalination plants (A-Q)
Country	Territory	City	Name	Capacity (per day)	Coordinates	Completion
Algeria	Aïn Témouchent	Béni Saf	Beni Saf Desalination Plant	200,000 m^{3} (260,000 cu yd)	35°21′36″N 1°15′55″W	2009
Algeria	Algiers	Algiers	Hamma Desalination Plant	200,000 m^{3} (260,000 cu yd)	36°45′05″N 3°04′47″E	2008
Algeria	Béjaïa	Toudja	Tighremt Desalination Plant	300,000 m^{3} (390,000 cu yd)	36°50′52″N 4°55′23″E	2025
Algeria	Boumerdès	Djinet	Cap Djinet Desalination Station (Reverse Osmosis)	100,000 m^{3} (130,000 cu yd)	36°50′43″N 3°41′23″E	2012
Algeria	Boumerdès	Djinet	Cap Djinet 2 Desalination Station (Reverse Osmosis)	300,000 m^{3} (390,000 cu yd)	36°50′18″N 3°41′35″E	2025
Algeria	Chlef	Ténès	Tenes Desalination Plant	200,000 m^{3} (260,000 cu yd)	36°30′15″N 1°13′35″E 36.014149, 0.128339	2015
Algeria	El Tarf	Berrihane	Koudiet Eddraouche Desalination Plant	300,000 m^{3} (390,000 cu yd)	36°53′07″N 8°05′05″E	2025
Algeria	Mostaganem	Mostaganem	TEC Sonaghter Desalination Plant	200,000 m^{3} (260,000 cu yd)	36°00′51″N 0°07′42″E	2012
Algeria	Oran	Mers El Hadjadj	Magtaa Reverse Osmosis (RO) Desalination Plant	500,000 m^{3} (650,000 cu yd)	35°47′10″N 0°09′00″W	2014
Algeria	Oran	Aïn El Kerma	Cap Blanc Desalination Plant	300,000 m^{3} (390,000 cu yd)	35°41′08″N 0°58′59″W	2025
Algeria	Skikda	Skikda	Skikda Desalination Plant	100,000 m^{3} (130,000 cu yd)	36°52′57″N 6°57′57″E	2009
Algeria	Tipaza	Fouka	Fouka Desalination Plant	120,000 m^{3} (160,000 cu yd)	36°40′43″N 2°45′44″E	2008
Algeria	Tipaza	Fouka	Fouka 2 Desalination Plant	300,000 m^{3} (390,000 cu yd)	36.67558663968185°N 2.7528849010127896°E	2025
Algeria	Tlemcen	Souk Tlata	Souk Tlata Desalination Plant	200,000 m^{3} (260,000 cu yd)	35°04′14″N 2°00′07″W	2011
Algeria	Tlemcen	Honaine	Tlemcen Hounaine Desalination Plant	200,000 m^{3} (260,000 cu yd)	35°10′55″N 1°38′48″W	2011
Australia	New South Wales	Sydney	Sydney Desalination Plant	250,000 m^{3} (330,000 cu yd)	34°01′29″S 151°12′18″E	2012
Australia	Queensland	Gold Coast	Gold Coast Desalination Plant	125,000 m^{3} (163,000 cu yd)	28°09′25″S 153°29′49″E	2009
Australia	South Australia	Adelaide	Adelaide Desalination Plant	300,000 m^{3} (390,000 cu yd)	35°05′49″S 138°29′02″E	2012
Australia	Victoria	Dalyston	Victorian Desalination Plant	410,000 m^{3} (540,000 cu yd)	35°05′49″S 138°29′02″E	2012
Australia	Western Australia	Cape Preston	Cape Preston Desalination Plant	140,000 m^{3} (180,000 cu yd)		2012
Australia	Western Australia	Perth	Perth Seawater Desalination Plant	130,000 m^{3} (170,000 cu yd)	32°12′11″S 115°46′23″E	2006
Australia	Western Australia	Binningup	Southern Seawater Desalination Plant	270,000 m^{3} (350,000 cu yd)	33°07′44″S 115°42′11″E	2012
Bahrain	Muharraq Island	Al Hidd	Al Hidd Desalination Plant	272,760 m^{3} (356,760 cu yd)	26.222515°N 50.6625°E	2000
Barbados	Saint Michael	Bridgetown	Ionics Desalination Plant	30,000 m^{3} (39,000 cu yd)	13°07′26″N 59°37′42″W	February 2000
Chile	Atacama Region	Caldera	Caldera Desalination Plant	100,000 m^{3} (130,000 cu yd)	27°03′23″S 70°50′24″W	January 2022
China	Tianjin	Tianjin	Beijing Desalination Plant	200,000 m^{3} (260,000 cu yd)	38°46′47″N 117°30′13″E	
Cyprus	Larnaca	Larnaca	MN Larnaca Desalination Co	64,000 m^{3} (84,000 cu yd)	34°52′09″N 33°37′51″E	2001
Germany	Schleswig-Holstein	Helgoland	Combined Desalination Plants for Island	150,000 m^{3} (200,000 cu yd)	54.174421°N 7.890677°E	1998
India	Tamil Nadu	Chennai	Minjur Seawater Desalination Plant	100,000 m^{3} (130,000 cu yd)	13°19′01″N 80°20′17″E	July 25, 2010
India	Tamil Nadu	Nemmeli	Nemmeli Desalination Plant	100,000 m^{3} (130,000 cu yd)	12°42′14″N 80°13′32″E	2012
Israel	Central	Palmachim	Palmachim Desalination Plant	246,000 m^{3} (322,000 cu yd)	31°56′11″N 34°42′41″E	May 2007
Israel	Central	Palmachim	Sorek Desalination Plant	625,000 m^{3} (817,000 cu yd)	31°56′37″N 34°43′57″E	2013
Israel	Haifa	Hadera	Hadera Desalination Plant	348,000 m^{3} (455,000 cu yd)	32°27′57″N 34°53′07″E	December 2009
Israel	Southern	Ashdod	Mekorot's Desalination Plant	274,000 m^{3} (358,000 cu yd)	31°50′59″N 34°41′08″E	December 2015
Israel	Southern	Ashkelon	Ashkelon Desalination Plant	329,000 m^{3} (430,000 cu yd)	31°38′07″N 34°31′22″E	August 2005
Kazakhstan	Mangystau	Aktau	Mangystau atomic-enegretic combinate	120,000m^{3}		1968
Kazakhstan	Mangystau	Aktau	Caspiy desalination plant	20,000 m^{3} (26,000 cu yd)	43°39′02″N 51°09′19″E	2011
Kazakhstan	Mangystau	Aktau	Kendirli desalination facility	50,000 m^{3}	42.785932, 52.644354	2025
Kuwait	Ahmadi	Mina Abd Allah	Shuaiba North Desalination Plant	136,000 m^{3} (178,000 cu yd)	29°02′08″N 48°09′12″E	
Kuwait	Ahmadi	Mina Abd Allah	Shuaiba South Desalination Plant	205,000 m^{3} (268,000 cu yd)	29°01′56″N 48°09′19″E	
Kuwait	Ahmadi	Zour	Az-Zour Desalination Plant	524,000 m^{3} (685,000 cu yd)	28°44′11″N 48°15′10″E	
Kuwait	Capital	Shuwaikh	Shuwaikh Desalination Plant	225,000 m^{3} (294,000 cu yd)	29.353452°N 47.9415°E	
Kuwait	Jahra	Doha	Doha East Desalination Plant	191,000 m^{3} (250,000 cu yd)	29°22′27″N 47°47′22″E	
Kuwait	Jahra	Doha	Doha West Desalination Plant	502,000 m^{3} (657,000 cu yd)	29°22′20″N 47°47′03″E	
Kuwait	Jahra	Subiya	Subiya Desalination Plant	455,000 m^{3} (595,000 cu yd)	29°40′12″N 47°58′17″E	
Malta	Southern Region	Siġġiewi	Għar Lapsi Reverse Osmosis Plant	20,000 m^{3} (26,000 cu yd)	35°49′43″N 14°25′07″E	1982
Malta	Eastern Region	Pembroke	Pembroke Reverse Osmosis Plant	54,000 m^{3} (71,000 cu yd)	35°55′56″N 14°28′49″E	2016
Maldives	Kaafu Atoll	Malé	Malé Water & Sewerage Company	11,000 m^{3} (14,000 cu yd)	4.171046°N 73.508391°E	2003
Mexico	Baja California			27,648 m^{3} (36,162 cu yd)		1960
Morocco	Souss-Massa	Chtouka Aït Baha	Chtouka Aitbaha Desalination Plant	400,000 m^{3} (520,000 cu yd)	30°08′23″N 9°38′55″W	2022
Oman	Al Batinah South	Ar Rumays	Barka 4 Desalination Plant	281,000 m^{3} (368,000 cu yd)	23°42′27″N 57°58′27″E	2018
Philippines	Cebu	Cordova	Cordova Desalination Plant	20,000 m^{3} (26,000 cu yd)	10°14′35.4″N 123°56′33.2″E	2024
Qatar	Al Wakrah	Doha	Ras Abu Fontas	160,000 m^{3} (210,000 cu yd)	25°12′21″N 51°36′59″E	1981
Saudi Arabia	Eastern Province	Jubail	Saline Water Conversion Corporation	1,009,000 m^{3} (1,320,000 cu yd)	26°54′13″N 49°45′39″E	2000
Saudi Arabia	Eastern Province	Khobar	Saline Water Conversion Corporation	432,280 m^{3} (565,400 cu yd)	26°10′44″N 50°12′25″E	2000
Saudi Arabia	Mecca Province	Jeddah	Saline Water Conversion Corporation	364,000 m^{3} (476,000 cu yd)	21°07′03″N 39°11′28″E	1994
Saudi Arabia	Mecca Province	Jeddah	Shuaiba Desalination Plant Saline Water Conversion Corporation	582,290 m^{3} (761,610 cu yd)	20°40′12″N 39°31′36″E	2001
Saudi Arabia	Medina Province	Yanbu	Saline Water Conversion Corporation	321,420 m^{3} (420,400 cu yd)	23°51′47″N 38°22′41″E	1998
South Africa	Western Cape	Mossel Bay	Mossel Bay Desalination Plant	15,000 m^{3} (20,000 cu yd)	34°09′03″S 22°06′34″E	2018
United Arab Emirates	Abu Dhabi	Al Shuweihat	Al Shuweihat S1	459,000 m^{3} (600,000 cu yd)	24°09′54″N 52°34′11″E	2001
United Arab Emirates	Abu Dhabi	Al Shuweihat	Al Shuweihat S2	459,000 m^{3} (600,000 cu yd)	24°09′25″N 52°34′09″E	2009
United Arab Emirates	Abu Dhabi	Al Taweelah	Taweelah A1	231,800 m^{3} (303,200 cu yd)	24°45′37″N 54°40′47″E	1999
United Arab Emirates	Abu Dhabi	Al Taweelah	Taweelah A2	382,000 m^{3} (500,000 cu yd)	24°45′40″N 54°40′57″E	2000
United Arab Emirates	Abu Dhabi	Al Taweelah	Taweelah B	736,000 m^{3} (963,000 cu yd)	24°45′57″N 54°41′12″E	2005
United Arab Emirates	Abu Dhabi	Al Taweelah	Al Taweelah RO	909,200 m^{3} (1,189,200 cu yd)	24°45′46″S 54°41′44″E	2022
United Arab Emirates	Abu Dhabi	Mirfa	Mirfa International Power and Water Company plant	241,000 m^{3} (315,000 cu yd)	24°07′16″N 53°26′49″E	2014
United Arab Emirates	Abu Dhabi	Umm Al Nar	Umm Al Nar plant	432,000 m^{3} (565,000 cu yd)	24°26′05″N 54°29′15″E	2003
United Arab Emirates	Dubai	Jebel Ali	Jebel Ali Power Plant and Water Desalination	2,227,600 m^{3} (2,913,600 cu yd)	25.059°N 55.118°E	2019
United Arab Emirates	Fujairah	Fujairah	Fujairah F1	595,500 m^{3} (778,900 cu yd)	25.301506°N 56.37111°E	2006
United Arab Emirates	Fujairah	Fujairah	Fujairah F2	600,000 m^{3} (780,000 cu yd)	25.308195°N 56.372705°E	2007

== Algeria ==
Algeria ranks 2nd in the Mediterranean with a desalinated water production capacity of (631 million m^{3}/year), followed by Spain (405 million m^{3}/year) and Egypt (200 million m^{3}/year). is believed to have at least 20 desalination plants in operation.

- Arzew IWPP Power & Desalination Plant, Arzew, 90,000m^{3}/day
- Cap Djinet Seawater Reverse Osmosis 100,000 m^{3}/day
- Tlemcen Souk Tleta 200,000 m^{3}/day
- Tlemcen Hounaine 200,000 m^{3}/day
- Beni Saf 200,000 m^{3}/day
- Tenes 200,000 m^{3}/day
- Fouka 120,000 m^{3}/day
- Tipaza 100,000 m^{3}/day
- Skikda 100,000 m^{3}/day
- Hamma Seawater Desalination Plant 200,000 m^{3}/day built by General Electric
- Mostaganem, (Sonaghter) 200,000 m^{3}/day
- Magtaa Reverse Osmosis (RO) Desalination Plant 500,000 m^{3}/day, Oran

== Aruba ==
The island of Aruba has a large (world's largest at the time of its inauguration) desalination plant, with a total installed capacity of 11.1 million US gallons (42,000 m^{3}) per day.

== Australia ==
The Millennium Drought (1997–2009) led to a water supply crisis across much of the country. A combination of increased water usage and lower rainfall/drought in Australia caused state governments to turn to desalination. As a result, several large-scale desalination plants were constructed (see list).

Large-scale seawater reverse osmosis plants (SWRO) now contribute to the domestic water supplies of several major Australian cities including Adelaide, Melbourne, Sydney, Perth and the Gold Coast. While desalination helped secure water supplies, it is energy intensive (≈$140/ML). In 2010, a Seawater Greenhouse went into operation in Port Augusta.

A growing number of smaller scale SWRO plants are used by the oil and gas industry (both on and offshore), by mining companies to supply slurry pipelines for the transport of ore and on offshore islands to supply tourists and residents.

== Bahrain ==
Completed in 2000, the Al Hidd Desalination Plant on Muharraq island employed a multistage flash process, and produces 272,760 m^{3} (9,632,000 cu ft) per day. The Al Hidd distillate forwarding station provides 410 million liters of distillate water storage in a series of 45-million-liter steel tanks. A 135-million-liters/day forwarding pumping station sends flows to the Hidd, Muharraq, Hoora, Sanabis, and Seef blending stations, and which has an option for gravity supply for low flows to blending pumps and pumps which forward to Janusan, Budiya and Saar.

Upon completion of the third construction phase, the Durrat Al Bahrain seawater reverse osmosis (SWRO) desalination plant was planned to have a capacity of 36,000 cubic meters of potable water per day to serve the irrigation needs of the Durrat Al Bahrain development. The Bahrain-based utility company, Energy Central Co contracted to design, build and operate the plant.

== Barbados ==
In 1994–1995 the island of Barbados experienced a severe 1 in 50 year severe drought that knocked much of the island's drinking water supply offline including the country's sole major hospital in the capital-city Bridgetown. An agreement was negotiated with General Electric's Ionics Inc. to build a reverse osmosis desalination plant on the south western coast of the island capable of supplying 20% of the islands population. The plant began operating within 15 months and was officially commissioned February 2000. Currently many cruise ships purchase water from Barbados due to its good quality.

== Cayman Islands ==
- West Bay, West Bay, Grand Cayman
- Abel Castillo Water Works, Governor's Harbour, Grand Cayman
- Britannia, Seven Mile Beach, Grand Cayman

== Chile ==
Desalination plants fully supply the Chilean cities of Antofagasta, Caldera and Mejillones. Mining in Chile consumes most desalinated water and this demand is driven by both the a need for more water to process copper ores with decreasing grades and restrictions on the use of freshwater. As of 2023, 9% of the water demand in Chilean mines was supplied by sea water of which 69% was desalinated. Twenty of Chile's 24 desalination plants (as of 2025) provide water for the mining industry.

- Copiapó Desalination Plant
- Thorium Power Canada, with its affiliate, DBI Chile, have proposed plans to build a 10 MW demonstration thorium reactor in Chile to power the 20 million litre/day desalination plant. All land and regulatory approvals are currently in process.

== China ==
China operates the Beijing Desalination Plant in Tianjin, a combination desalination and coal-fired power plant designed to alleviate Tianjin's critical water shortage. Though the facility has the capacity to produce 200,000 cubic metres (7,100,000 cu ft) of potable water per day, it has never operated at more than one-quarter capacity due to difficulties with local companies and inadequate local infrastructure.

The Hong Kong Water Supplies Department had pilot desalination plants in Tuen Mun and Ap Lei Chau using reverse-osmosis technology. The production cost was put at HK$7.8 to HK$8.4 /m^{3}. Hong Kong used to have a desalination plant in Lok On Pai, Siu Lam.

In 2014, the government confirmed the reservation of a 10-hectare site at Tseung Kwan O for the construction of a reverse-osmosis desalination plant with an initial output capacity of 50 million cubic metres per annum. Plans include provisions for future expansion to an ultimate capacity of 90 million cubic metres per annum, which will meet about 10 per cent of Hong Kong's fresh water demand. Detailed feasibility studies, preliminary design and a cost-effectiveness analysis are planned to be completed by 2014. A commissioning date of 2020 is envisaged.

== Cyprus ==
A plant operates in Cyprus near the town of Larnaca. The Dhekelia Desalination Plant uses the reverse osmosis system.

== Egypt ==
- Dahab Desalination Plants Dahab 3,600 m^{3}/day completed 1999. The facility in the South Sinai is being expanded to produce 15,000 m^{3}/day
- Hurgada and Sharm El-Sheikh Power and Desalination Plants
- Oyoun Moussa Power and Desalination
- Zaafarana Power and Desalination
- Remelah Desalination Plant

As of May 2022, Egypt had a total of 82 desalination plants with a combined capacity of 917,000 cubic meters per day.

== Germany ==
Fresh water on the island of Helgoland is supplied by two reverse osmosis desalination plants.

== Gibraltar ==
Fresh water in Gibraltar is supplied by a number of reverse osmosis and multistage flash desalination plants. A demonstration forward osmosis desalination plant also operates there.

== India ==
India has two large desalinization plants for domestic uses, the Minjur Seawater Desalination Plant and the Nemmeli plant, both in Chennai with 100 million litres per day (MLPD) capacity. For industrial uses, 100 MLPD plant was set up in Dahej, Gujarat in 2022 with an investment cost of approximately ₹900 crore (US$93 million).

== Iran ==
Iran's Central Plateau Basin, the country's main watershed, is highlighted in green.

An assumption is that around 400,000 m^{3}/d of historic and newly installed capacity is operational in Iran. In terms of technology, Iran's existing desalination plants use a mix of thermal processes and RO. MSF is the most widely used thermal technology although MED and vapour compression (VC) also feature.

Iranian project Persian Gulf Water Transfer WASCO will see the biggest desalination project in the world based in Bandar Abas with 1.6 million capacity. There are three phases, phase 1 will be fully complete by 2024.

== Israel ==
Israel Desalination Enterprises' Sorek Desalination Plant north of Palmachim was foreseen to provide up to 26,000 m^{3} of potable water per hour once it went online in June 2013 (that is ca. 228 million m^{3} when projected on an entire year). Once unthinkable, given Israel's history of drought and lack of available fresh water resources, with desalination Israel can now produce a surplus of fresh water.

By 2014, Israel's desalination programs provided roughly 35% of Israel's drinking water, about 50% in 2015, and it is expected to supply 70% by 2050. As of May 29, 2015, more than 50 percent of the water for Israeli households, agriculture and industry is artificially produced.

In October 2025, Israel initiated a project to replenish the diminishing water level in the Sea of Galilee using desalinated water. The effort began by pumping 1,000 cubic metres (35,000 cu ft) of water per hour, which was increased in March 2026 to 4,000 cubic metres (140,000 cu ft) per hour. The water is sent from plants near the Mediterranean Sea over land via the Reverse Carrier to the Tzalmon Stream in Ein Ravid, where it replenishes local water supplies and makes its way to the Sea of Gallilee.

Existing Israeli water desalination facilities
Location	Opened	Capacity (million m^{3}/year)	Cost of water (per m^{3})	Notes
Ashkelon	August 2005	120	NIS 2.60	(capacity as of 2010)
Palmachim	May 2007	45	NIS 2.90	
Hadera	December 2009	127	NIS 2.60	
Sorek	2013	228	NIS 2.01–2.19	
Ashdod	December 2015	100	NIS 2.40	(expansion up to 150 million m^{3}/year possible)

Additional desalination plants supply the entire freshwater needs of the city of Eilat by desalinating a mix of brackish well water and seawater. Similar plants exist in the Arava and the southern coastal plain of the Carmel range.

== Kazakhstan ==
MAEK-Kazatomprom LLP operates sea water desalination plant in Aktau, Mangystau from 1967. Now its power comes to 120,000 m^{3}/day after modernizing in 2023. Earlier it was a part of combined combinate with Nuclear plant and gas electric power stations. Aktau also has "Kaspiy"- membrane technology water desalination plant, which power comes to 20,000 m^{3}/day. Kendirli desalination plant was inaugurated in July 2025 south of the city of Zhanaozen, and it has capacity to produce 50,000 m^{3}/day.

There are concerns about the ability to produce water since Caspian sea levels are dropping.

== Kuwait ==
Kuwait does not have any permanent rivers. It does have some wadis, the most notable of which is Wadi Al-Batin which forms the border between Kuwait and Iraq.

Kuwait relies on water desalination as a primary source of fresh water for drinking and domestic purposes. There are currently more than six desalination plants. Kuwait was the first country in the world to use desalination to supply water for large-scale domestic use. The history of desalination in Kuwait dates back to 1951 when the first distillation plant was commissioned.

== Malta ==
Malta has four reverse osmosis desalination plants in Pembroke, Cirkewwa, Ghar Lapsi and Hondoq and in 2022 they produced about 22 mln m^{3} of water, accounting for 64% of total water production in the country.

- Ghar Lapsi II 50,000 m^{3}/day

== Maldives ==
Maldives is a nation of small islands. Some depend on desalination as a source of water.

== Mexico ==
The first desalination plant in Mexico was built in 1960 and had a capacity of 27,648 m^{3}/day.

As of 2006, there were 435 desalination plants in Mexico with a total capacity of 311,700 m^{3}/day.

One of the world's largest desalination plants (380,160 m^{3}/day) is planned for Rosarito.

== Morocco ==
There are multiple desalination projects ongoing in Morocco, mostly desalinating seawater from the Atlantic Ocean.

Existing Moroccan water desalination facilities
Location	Opened	Capacity (million m^{3}/year)	Notes
Casablanca	2030	250	Between MAD2 and MAD6 per m^{3}.
Agadir - Sous Massa	2020	275	World's largest desalinization plant when completed
Jorf Lasfar	2021	40	

== Norway ==
Norway is a country with little to no problems with water access. Over 99% of the population's water supply comes from fresh water sources such as lakes, tarns, rivers and ground water. There are however three water works in Norway taking use of desalination of sea water and all of them are located in the county of Nordland, only providing around 500 people with water.

== Oman ==
A pilot seawater greenhouse was built in 2004 near Muscat, in collaboration with Sultan Qaboos University, providing a sustainable horticultural sector on the Batinah coast.

- Ghubrah Power & Desalination Plant, Muscat
- Sohar Power & Desalination Plant, Sohar
- Sur R.O. Desalination Plant 80,000 m^{3}/day 2009
- Qarn Alam 1,000 m^{3}/day
- Wilayat Diba 2,000 m^{3}/day

There are at least two forward osmosis plants operating in Oman

- Al Najdah 200 m^{3}/day (built by Modern Water)
- Al Khaluf

== Palestine ==
As of 2007, there was one seawater desalination plant in Deir al-Balah in the Gaza Strip, built in 1997–99 with funding by the Austrian government. It has a capacity of 600 cubic metres (21,000 cu ft) per day and it is owned and operated by the Coastal Municipalities Water Utility. At least initially, the operating costs were subsidized by the Austrian government. The desalinated water is distributed to 13 water kiosks.

For over 20 years, a major desalination plant for Gaza has been discussed. The Palestinian Water Authority has approved a $500 million facility. The New York Times reported in 2013 that Israel supported this and had begun to offer Palestinians desalination training. In 2012 the French government committed a 10 million-euro grant for the plant. Arab countries, coordinated by the Islamic Development Bank, committed to provide half of the necessary funds, matching an expected European financial commitment. The European Investment Bank provides technical assistance.

Another major problem is that desalination is very energy-intensive, while the import of fuel to produce the necessary electricity is restricted by Israel and Egypt. Furthermore, revenues from drinking water tariffs are insufficient to cover the operating costs of the envisaged plant at the current tariff level.

== Pakistan ==
A water desalination plant was recently inaugurated by Pakistan's Minister for Ports and Shipping at the port city of Gwader on 01 Jan, 2018. This is one of the biggest of its kind plant in Pakistan. On the inauguration day the Pakistan's Minister for Ports and Shipping said in his address,

To drive this point home, he mentioned that this plant (which can hold 5 million gallons of water) will provide 254,000 US gallons (960 m^{3}) of clean potable drinking water per day – at Rs. 0.8 per gallon.

== Qatar ==
- Ras Abu Fontas (RAF) A2 – 160,000 m^{3}/day. The country has plans for two plants with an additional 735,000 m^{3}/ day

== Saudi Arabia ==
The Saline Water Conversion Corporation of Saudi Arabia provides 50% of the municipal water in the Kingdom, operates a number of desalination plants, and has contracted $1.892 billion to a Japanese-South Korean consortium to build a new facility capable of producing a billion liters per day, opening at the end of 2013. They currently operate 32 plants in the Kingdom; one example at Shoaiba cost $1.06 billion and produces 450 million liters per day.

- Corniche RO Plant (Crop) (operated by SAWACO)
- Jubail 1,400,000 m^{3}/day
- North Obhor Plant (operated by SAWACO)
- Rabigh 7,000 m^{3}/day (operated by wetico)
- planned for completion 2018 Rabigh II 600,000 m^{3}/day (under construction Saline Water Conversion Corporation)
- Ras Al-Khair Power and Desalination Plant (operated by Saline Water Conversion Corporation) A hybrid plant serving Riyadh constructed in 2014, and producing 1,036,000 m^{3}/day of water and 2,400MW of electricity.
- Shuaibah III 150,000 m^{3}/day (operated by Doosan)
- South Jeddah Corniche Plant (SOJECO) (operated by SAWACO)
- Yanbu Multi Effect Distillation (MED), Saudi Arabia 146,160 m^{3}/day

== Singapore ==
Desalinated water is planned to meet 30% of Singapore's future water needs by 2060.

Existing (25% of Singapore's 2017 water demand)

- SingSpring, Tuas (2005) – 30 million imperial gallons (mgd) / 136,380 m^{3}/day @ 3.5kWh/m3
- Sungei Tampines (2007) – 4,000 m^{3}/day, small scale variable salinity desalination.
- Tuas South, Tuas (2013) – 70 million imperial gallons (mgd) / 318,500 m^{3}/day @ integrated with a 411 MW on-site combined cycle gas turbine power plant
- Tuas (2017) – 137,000 m^{3}/day
- Marina East (2020) – 30 million imperial gallons (mgd) / 137,000 m^{3}/day. World's first full scale variable salinity plant capable of treating both river water and seawater.
- Jurong Island (2022) – 30 million imperial gallons (mgd) / 137,000 m^{3}/day. Located next to an existing power plant

== Spain ==
Lanzarote is the easternmost of the autonomous Canary Islands, which are of volcanic origin. It is the closest of the islands to the Sahara desert and therefore the driest, and it has limited water supplies. A private, commercial desalination plant was installed in 1964 to serve the whole island and enable the tourism industry. In 1974, the venture was injected with investments from local and municipal governments, and a larger infrastructure was put in place in 1989, the Lanzarote Island Waters Consortium (INALSA) was formed.

A prototype seawater greenhouse was constructed in Tenerife in 1992.

- Alicante II 65,000 m^{3}/day (operator Inima)
- Tordera 60,000 m^{3}/day
- Barcelona 200,000 m^{3}/day (operator Degremont) El Prat, near Barcelona, a desalination plant completed in 2009 was meant to provide water to the Barcelona metropolitan area, especially during the periodic severe droughts that put the available amounts of drinking water under serious stress.
- Oropesa 50,000 m^{3}/day (operator Técnicas Reunidas)
- Moncofa 60,000 m^{3}/day (operator Inima)
- Marina Baja – Mutxamel 50,000 m^{3}/day (operator Degremont)
- Torrevieja 240,000 m^{3}/day (operator Acciona)
- Cartagena Escombreras 63,000 m^{3}/day (operator Cobra | Tedagua)
- Edam Ibiza + Edam San Antonio 25,000 m^{3}/day (operator Ibiza – Portmany)
- Mazarron 36,000 m^{3}/day (operator Tedagua)
- Bajo Almanzora 65,000 m^{3}/day

== South Africa ==
Numerous towns in South Africa have operational reverse osmosis plants, with the first - the Albany Coast RO plant - having been installed in 1997. Most existing plants are used in areas with scarce access to freshwater supplies, or for energy production projects. However, these plants are small, and no major city has as yet built a large-scale desalination facility.

SA's in-operation desalination plants are below.

- Witsand Solar Desalination Plant: 300 m^{3}/day
- Mossel Bay: 15,000 m^{3}/day
- Transnet Saldanha: 2,400 m^{3}/day
- Knysna: 2,000 m^{3}/day
- Plettenberg Bay: 2,000 m^{3}/day
- Bushman's River Mouth: 1,800 m^{3}/day
- Lambert's Bay: 1,700 m^{3}/day
- Cannon Rocks: 750 m^{3}/day

In September 2024, the City of Cape Town announced plans to build a major desalination plant to supplement 11% of the City of Cape Town's water supply by 2030. Cape Town is South Africa's second-largest city by population (at around 5 million residents as of 2025).

As part of the city's New Water Program, the desalination plant will be situated in the light industrial suburb of Paarden Eiland, and will produce between 50 million and 70 million liters of water per day. The plant will form part of the Program's broader efforts to bolster water security across the metro. The New Water Program aims to add 300 million liters of water per day to Cape Town's supply, via a 10-year, R120 billion infrastructure investment.

== Sweden ==
While mainland Sweden is able to depend on long rivers, many thousands of lakes and groundwater, the sunny and dry nature of the Baltic Sea archipelago has led to a deficit of water on the island of Gotland. The island has two desalination plants for brackish water from the Baltic Sea, one built 2016 in Herrvik with a capacity to produce 480 m^{3}/day, and another one with a capacity of 7 500 m^{3}/day in Kvarnåkershamn.

== Taiwan ==
In February 2021, a desalination plant with a daily capacity of 13,000 tons was built as an answer to a water emergency. The plant was supposed to support semiconductor production in greater Hsinchu area from Nanliao.

== Trinidad and Tobago ==
The Republic of Trinidad and Tobago uses desalination to open up more of the island's water supply for drinking purposes. The country's desalination plant, opened in March 2003, is considered to be the first of its kind. It was the largest desalination facility in the Americas, and it processes 28,800,000 US gallons (109,000 m^{3}) of water a day at the price of $2.67 per 1,000 US gallons (3.8 m^{3}).

This plant will be located at Trinidad's Point Lisas Industrial Estate, a park of more than 12 companies in various manufacturing and processing functions, and it will allow for easy access to water for both factories and residents in the country.

== United Arab Emirates ==
The UAE relies has over 70 desalination plants, and relies on desalination for 42% of its drinking water. The hosts some of the world's largest desalination plants, which are listed in the table above. The include the Jebel Ali desalination plant in Dubai, a dual-purpose facility, uses multistage flash distillation and is the largest in the world, capable of producing 2,227,600 m^{3} (2,913,600 cu yd) of water per day. Al Taweelah RO is the world's largest reverse osmosis desalination plant, producing 909,200 m^{3} (1,189,200 cu yd) of water per day.

Some of the smaller ones include:

- Kalba 15,000 m^{3}/day built for Sharjah Electricity and Water Authority completed 2010 (operator CH2MHill)
- Khor Fakkan 22,500 m^{3}/day (operator CH2MHill)
- Ghalilah RAK 68,000 m^{3}/day (operator Aquatech)
- Hamriyah 90,000 m^{3}/day (operator Aqua Engineering)
- Al Zawrah 27,000 m^{3}/day (operator Aqua Engineering)
- Layyah I 22,500 m^{3}/day (operator CH2MHill)
- Emayil & Saydiat Island ≈20,000 m^{3}/day (operator Aqua EPC)
- Al Yasat Al Soghrih Island 2M gallons per day (GPD) or 9,000 m^{3}/day
- A seawater greenhouse was constructed on Al Aryam Island, Abu Dhabi, United Arab Emirates in 2000.

== United Kingdom and Crown dependencies ==
The first large-scale plant in the United Kingdom, the Thames Water Desalination Plant, was built in Beckton, east London for Thames Water by Acciona Agua. It was built in 2010 at a cost of £250m. The plant provides up to 150 million litres of drinking water each day (150,000 cubic metres) – enough for nearly one million people.

=== Jersey ===
The desalination plant located near La Rosière, La Corbière, Jersey, is operated by Jersey Water. Built in 1970 in an abandoned quarry, it was the first in the British Isles.

The original plant used a multistage flash (MSF) distillation process, whereby seawater was boiled under vacuum, evaporated and condensed into a freshwater distillate. In 1997, the MSF plant reached the end of its operational life and was replaced with a modern reverse osmosis plant.

Its maximum power demand is 1,750 kW, and the output capacity is 6,000 cubic meters per day. Specific energy consumption is 6.8 kWh/m^{3}.

== United States ==
=== Texas ===
There are a dozen different desalination projects in the state of Texas, both for desalinating groundwater and desalinating seawater from the Gulf of Mexico. Corpus Christi is currently in the process of finding a contractor to start the development of one in the Corpus Christi ship channel. However, currently there are no seawater desalination plants earmarked for municipal purposes.

- El Paso: Brackish groundwater has been treated at the El Paso, Texas, plant since around 2004. It produces 27,500,000 US gallons (104,000,000 L; 22,900,000 imp gal) of fresh water daily (about 25% of total freshwater deliveries) by reverse osmosis. The plant's water cost – largely representing the cost of energy – is about 2.1 times higher than ordinary groundwater production.

=== California ===
California has 17 desalination plants in the works, either partially constructed or through exploration and planning phases. The list of locations includes Bay Point, in the Delta, Redwood City, seven in the Santa Cruz / Monterey Bay, Cambria, Oceaneo, Redondo Beach, Huntington Beach, Dana Point, Camp Pendleton, Oceanside and Carlsbad.

- Carlsbad: The Claude "Bud" Lewis Carlsbad Desalination Plant was constructed at a cost of $1 billion by Poseidon Resources and was the largest desalination plant in the United States when it went online December 14, 2015. It produces 50 million gallons a day to 110,000 customers throughout San Diego County.
- Monterey County: Sand City, two miles north of Monterey, with a population of 334, is the only city in California completely supplied with water from a desalination plant.
- Santa Barbara: The Charles Meyer Desalination Facility was constructed in Santa Barbara, California, in 1991–92 as a temporary emergency water supply in response to severe drought. While it has a high operating cost, the facility only needs to operate infrequently, allowing Santa Barbara to use its other supplies more extensively. The plant was re-activated in the spring of 2017.

=== Florida ===
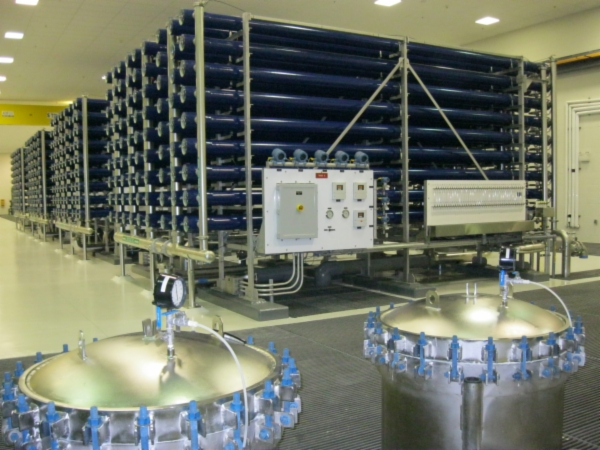
RO production train, North Cape Coral RO Plant

In 1977, Cape Coral, Florida became the first municipality in the United States to use the RO process on a large scale with an initial operating capacity of 3 million gallons per day. By 1985, due to the rapid growth in population of Cape Coral, the city had the largest low pressure reverse osmosis plant in the world, capable of producing 15 MGD.

As of 2012, South Florida has 33 brackish and two seawater desalination plants operating with seven brackish water plants under construction. The brackish and seawater desalination plants have the capacity to produce 245 million gallons of potable water per day.

The Tampa Bay Water desalination project near Tampa, Florida, was originally a private venture led by Poseidon Resources, but it was delayed by the bankruptcy of Poseidon Resources' successive partners in the venture, Stone & Webster, then Covanta (formerly Ogden) and its principal subcontractor, Hydroanautics. Stone & Webster declared bankruptcy June 2000. Covanta and Hydranautics joined in 2001, but Covanta failed to complete the construction bonding, and then the Tampa Bay Water agency purchased the project on May 15, 2002, underwriting the project. Tampa Bay Water then contracted with Covanta Tampa Construction, which produced a project that failed performance tests. After its parent went bankrupt, Covanta also filed for bankruptcy prior to performing renovations that would have satisfied contractual agreements. This resulted in nearly six months of litigation. In 2004, Tampa Bay Water hired a renovation team, American Water/Acciona Aqua, to bring the plant to its original, anticipated design. The plant was deemed fully operational in 2007, and is designed to run at a maximum capacity of 25 million US gallons (95,000 m^{3}) per day. The plant can now produce up to 25 million US gallons (95,000 m^{3}) per day when needed.

=== Arizona ===
- Yuma: The desalination plant in Yuma, Arizona, was constructed under authority of the state Colorado River Basin Salinity Control Act of 1974 to treat saline agricultural return flows from the Wellton-Mohawk Irrigation and Drainage District into the Colorado River. The treated water is intended for inclusion in water deliveries to Mexico, thereby keeping a like amount of freshwater in Lake Mead, Arizona and Nevada. Construction of the plant was completed in 1992, and it has operated on two occasions since then. With a full capacity of 73 million gallons per day of permeate water, it is the largest desalination plant in the US. The plant has been maintained, but largely not operated due to sufficient freshwater supplies from the upper Colorado River. An agreement was reached in April 2010 between the Southern Nevada Water Authority, the Metropolitan Water District of Southern California, the Central Arizona Project, and the U.S. Bureau of Reclamation to underwrite the cost of running the plant in a year-long pilot project.

== Western Sahara ==
A water desalination project is planned in Western Sahara, within the area under Moroccan occupation. The Moroccan wall entirely blocks the Sahrawi Arab Democratic Republic's access to the sea, preventing it from establishing any desalination facilities.

Existing Western Saharan water desalination facilities
Location	Opened	Capacity (million m^{3}/year)	Notes
Dakhla	2018	30	
