= Fouka =

Fouka or Fukah may refer to:

- Fouka District, a district in Tipaza Province, Algeria
- Fouka, Algeria, a commune in Tipaza Province, Algeria
- Fouka, Egypt, a town in Mersa Matruh, Egypt

== See also ==
- Foukas, a mountain in Greece
