= Claude "Bud" Lewis Carlsbad Desalination Plant =

Desalination plant in Carlsbad, California

- Location within San Diego County Claude "Bud" Lewis Carlsbad Desalination Plant (California)
- Interactive map of Claude "Bud" Lewis Carlsbad Desalination Plant
- Location: Carlsbad, California
- Coordinates: 33°08′20″N 117°20′07″W
- Estimated output: 50×10^{6} US gal (190,000 m^{3}) per day (190 megalitres)
- Cost: US$1 billion
- Technology: Reverse osmosis
- Percent of water supply: Estimated 7% of San Diego County

The Claude "Bud" Lewis Carlsbad Desalination Plant is a desalination plant in Carlsbad, California. The San Diego County Water Authority (SDCWA), the recipient of the fresh water produced by the plant, calls it "the nation’s largest, most technologically advanced and energy-efficient seawater desalination plant." Opened on December 14, 2015, the entire desalination project cost about $1 billion for the plant, pipelines, and upgrades to existing SDCWA facilities to use the water.

== History ==
The project to build a desalination plant in San Diego County, California, commenced in 1993 after five years of drought. Membrane technology used in the plant was pioneered by General Atomics in La Jolla. Environmentalists opposed the construction due to various concerns, most notably energy consumption, brine discharge and that the ocean water intake could kill fish. Five lawsuits were brought against the plant, including by the Surfrider Foundation, San Diego Coastkeeper, and the Coastal Environmental Rights Foundation, but none were successful.

=== Construction ===
The plant construction started in December 2012, and was originally scheduled to be completed in 2016. Due to the continuing drought in California, plant completion was advanced to late 2015. The plant began regular operations in December 2015. It was named after a former Carlsbad mayor, Claude "Bud" Lewis, who held the position for almost a quarter of a century. Lewis died in 2014 and was a supporter of construction of the desalination plant. After completion, it underwent six months of testing before being brought online.

The fresh water output from the plant is sent by a 10 mi (16 km) long, 4.5 ft (1.4 m) diameter pipeline, utilizing six pumps, to connect to the SDCWA distribution system in San Marcos. Pipeline construction began in 2013 and was completed June 28, 2015.

Poseidon Water built the plant. The main engineering companies on the project were GHD Group and U.S.-based Butier Engineering Inc. IDE Americas Inc., a subsidiary of Israel-based IDE Technologies, designed the plant. IDE Technologies is jointly owned by Delek Group and Israel Chemicals. Simon Wong Engineering was subcontracted to provide the design and structural engineering services. The J.F. Shea Company and Kiewit Corporation constructed the plant.

The plant took nearly 14 years to permit, design, and build. The total project cost was expected to reach near $1 billion; initial cost estimates ranged from $250 million in 2004 to $690 million in 2010. The cost of construction was funded by bond sales. In late 2012, Fitch Ratings gave the bonds their lowest investment grade rating. Upon completion, it became the largest desalination plant in the Western Hemisphere.

=== Operations ===
In 2016, the plant fulfilled 95% of water orders, falling to 70% of water orders the following year. In December 2018, the plant produced its 40-billionth gallon of water; with capacity to provide water for up to 400,000 people. A January 2019 study noted that plant discharge had noticeably increased nearby salinity, but with no known effects to nearby marine life. Though touted by Poseidon as a "climate-proof" water source, at times the plant has been temporarily closed due to red tides.

== How it works ==
As of 2026 100,000,000 US gal (380,000 m^{3}) per day of cooling water from Encina Power Station is taken into the desalination plant. The water intake is filtered through gravel, sand, and other media to greatly reduce particulates before going through reverse osmosis filtration. Half of the saltwater taken into the plant is converted into pure potable water, with the rest discharged as concentrated brine.

The outflow of the plant is put into the discharge from Encina Power Station for dilution, for a final salt concentration about 20% higher than seawater. Most desalination plants discharge water with about 50% extra salt, which can lead to dead spots in the ocean, because the super-salinated brine does not mix well with seawater. Encina Power Station was demolished, and Poseidon Water took over dredging responsibility for Agua Hedionda Lagoon, taking over from NRG; without dredging at the mouth of the lagoon, it would revert to being a pre-1952 mudflat.

== Environmental concerns ==
To offset environmental impacts, 66 acres (27 ha) of wetlands were built in San Diego Bay. Solar panels will be installed on the roof of the plant, and carbon emission offsets will be purchased.

San Diego Coastkeeper is suing the SDCWA over environmental concerns. On July 29, 2015, it argued in a hearing before Superior Court Judge Gregory Pollack that the Authority's long-term water plan (and specifically the Carlsbad desalination plant) violates the California Environmental Quality Act, specifically with respect to energy needs and the greenhouse gases associated with those. The Authority says that these have been accounted for, and a mitigation plan has been put into place.

== Water quantity and cost ==
The plant is expected to produce 50×10^{6} US gal (190,000 m^{3}) of water per day (0.069 km^{3}/a) with energy use of ~3.6 kWh for 1 m^{3} fresh water, or ~38 MW of average continuous power. Another estimate has the plant requiring 40 MW to operate, and a cost of $49 million to $59 million a year. It will provide about 7% of the potable water needs for the San Diego region.

The San Diego County Water Authority signed a contract with the plant operator to purchase a minimum 48,000 acre-feet per year of water, but it can also demand up to a maximum of 56,000 acre-feet per year. This is equivalent to 43 million gallons per day (mgd), or about 86% of the plant's output.

As of May 2015, estimates for the cost of water from the plant will be $1300 to $1400 per acre-foot to produce ($0.40 per 100 gallons). As a comparison, reservoir water costs only $300 per acre foot ($0.09 per per 100 gallons), while recycled water costs $1,200 per acre-foot ($0.37 per 100 gallons). The most expensive water is imported from outside the district with a cost of $1,500 per acre-foot ($0.46 per 100 gallons).

As of April 2015, San Diego County imported 90% of its water. A conglomerate of California-based environmentalist groups, the Desal Response Group, claimed that the plant will cost San Diego County $108 million a year.

In April 2026, Arizona’s Department of Water Resources and the Southern Nevada Water Authority were in talks with the San Diego County Water Authority to "purchase" most of the plant's output through an exchange of San Diego's Colorado river water rights with the Arizona and Nevada entities.

== See also ==
- Desalination facilities
- Huntington Beach Desalination Plant
