= Nemmeli Seawater Desalination Plant =

Desalination plant supplying Chennai, India

- Location within Tamil Nadu Nemmeli Seawater Desalination Plant (India)
- Interactive map of Nemmeli Seawater Desalination Plant
- Location: Nemmeli, Chennai, Tamil Nadu, India
- Coordinates: 12°42′13.41″N 80°13′32.83″E
- Estimated output: 100 million litres per day
- Cost: ₹ 5,333.8 million
- Technology: Desalination
- Operation date: 22 February 2013

The Nemmeli Desalination Plant is a water desalination plant at Nemmeli, Chennai, on the coast of the Bay of Bengal that supplies water to the city of Chennai. Initially the desalination plant experienced operational issues since the beginning and was shut down most of the time as contractor had installed the desalination plant without dissolved air floatation units leading to severe and regular choking of filters. It is located about 35 km south of the city centre, along the East Coast Road. Built at a cost of ₹ 5,333.8 million, the plant is the second desalination plant in the city after the 100-MLD (million litres per day) plant at Minjur and itself has a capacity to treat 100 million litres of seawater a day.

The plant was inaugurated by the then Chief Minister of Tamil Nadu J.Jayalalithaa on 22 February 2010. was built to provide piped water to residents of south Chennai and the newly merged areas.

== The plant ==
The plant, owned by Chennai Metrowater, was constructed by VA Tech Wabag, in consortium with IDE Technologies in Israel, and Larsen and Toubro (L&T) Limited laid the 65-km-long pipeline from the plant to various parts of the city and built underground sumps en route. MECON Limited, a Govt. of India Enterprises, carried out the project management consultancy services for plant construction. The DPR (detailed project report), complete design and detailed engineering and bid document was also prepared by MECON Limited. The plant was constructed with a grant obtained from the central government. Underground sumps and water distribution stations are located in Tiruvanmiyur, Velachery, Nemmeli, Kelambakkam, and Akkarai. The pumping stations at Nemmeli, Akarai, Tiruvanmiyur and Velachery have a combined capacity of 1,375 HP. The process technology involves marine sea water intake system and pre-treatment system consisting of disc filters followed by ultra filtration (UF). A 1,050-metre-long pipeline with a diameter of 1,600 mm (HDPE) has been sunk at a depth of about 14.1 m in the sea side and 5.5 m in the shore side, capable of drawing nearly 265 MLD of seawater by means of gravity. Another 750-metre-long pipeline with a diameter of 1,200 mm discharges waste water from the plant. Disc filters and ultra-filtration membranes that remove sediment and finer sand particles from the raw seawater were imported from Israel, while additional reverse osmosis membranes were imported from Japan.

The pipeline, varying in diameter from 500 mm to 700 mm, runs for a distance of 64.371 km, and bridges have been constructed above the pipelines in areas such as Kelambakkam, Muttukadu, and Kovalam.

Although 40.5 acres of land was allotted for the plant, only 20 acres were required as fewer treatment units were built at the site. This is because the plant uses a compact and faster treatment process compared to the conventional filtration system used in the Minjur desalination plant.

== Operations ==
The desalination plant experienced problems in the beginning and was shut down most of the time as contractor proposed the design without dissolved air floatation leading to severe and regular choking of filters. The plant treats the seawater by means of several units, including those containing disc filters and ultra filtration membranes, to remove the suspended solids in the seawater. Then the water is sent to the final stage of the treatment process through reverse osmosis membranes before distribution, which reduces the total dissolved solids in seawater from about 40,000 parts per million (ppm) to 300 ppm, thus making it potable.

In the first phase of its operation, about 50 MLD of treated water is expected to be transmitted due to plant downtime, with the amount getting stepped up gradually after contactor addressed faulty pre treatment design.

In December 2013, the plant reached its full capacity generation of 100 MLD. As of 2019, the plant produces 93 MLD on an average, catering to 1 million residents in South Chennai.

== Cost ==
The production cost of treated water at the plant has been calculated approximately as ₹36 per kilolitre of water.

== Expansion ==
A second desalination plant at the Nemmeli premises, and the third in the city, with a capacity of 150 MLD at a cost of ₹ 12,593.8 million is under construction on the 10.50-acre plot of vacant land near the existing plant. Planned in 2013, it will employ the reverse osmosis process as the current one, but with additional components in the pre-treatment process including dissolved air flotation and ultra filtration to prevent particles such as sea algae from hindering the purification process as it happened in Nemmeli Phase 1. The treated water will be distributed via a 49-km-long pipeline, serving about 900,000 people in southern areas of the city including Alandur, Sholinganallur, Medavakkam, Nanmangalam, Kovilambakkam, and St. Thomas Mount. The project is partly funded by KfW, the German Development Bank. The production cost for treated water is estimated to be ₹42 per kiloliter as against ₹36 per kiloliter in the first Nemmeli plant. A 1-km pipeline will be laid in the sea at a depth of 10 meters to draw seawater. A 750-meter-long pipeline will discharge the waste water.

== See also ==
- Minjur Seawater Desalination Plant
- Reverse osmosis plant
- Water management in Chennai
