= Ras Bu Fontas station =

Metro station in Doha, Qatar

Ras Bu Fontas Metro Station
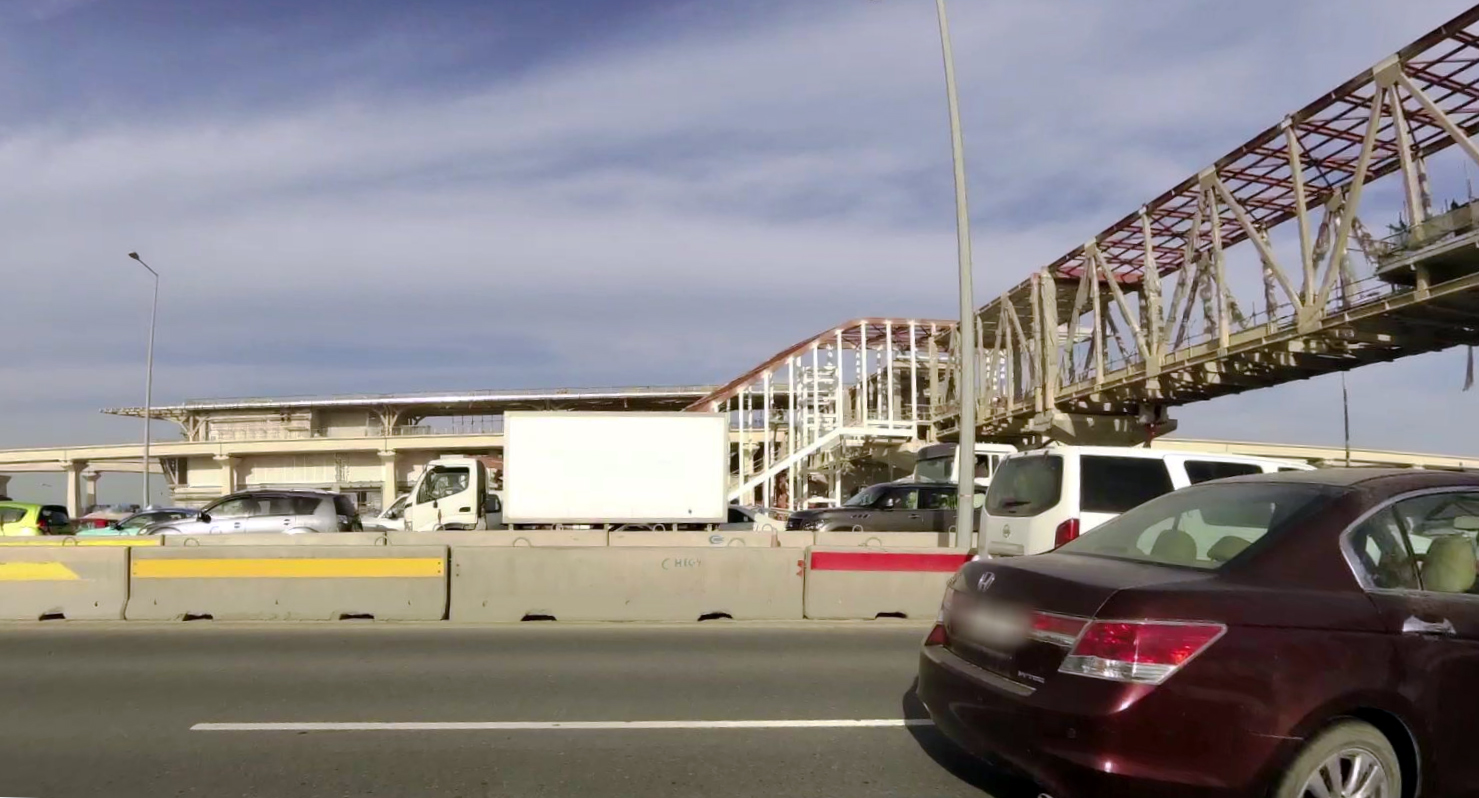

General information
- Location: Al Wakrah Road, Ras Abu Fontas; Qatar
- Coordinates: 25.21143°N 51.58638°E
- Owner: Qatar Rail
- Operator: Doha Metro
- Platforms: 1
- Connections: MetroLink Bus

Construction
- Structure type: Elevated
- Accessible: Yes

Other information
- Website: http://www.qr.com.qa/

History
- Opened: 8 May 2019

Services
Preceding station	Doha Metro	Following station
Free Zone towards Lusail	Red Line	Al Wakra Terminus
Location

Ras Bu Fontas station is one of stations of the Doha Metro's Red Line in Doha, Qatar. It serves the Al Wakrah Municipality, namely Al Wakrah City, Ras Abu Fontas and Barwa Village.

== History ==
As part of the Doha Metro's phase 1, the station was inaugurated on 8 May 2019, along with most other Red Line stations.

== Station facilities ==
Among the station's facilities are a Qatar National Bank ATM, a prayer room and restrooms.

== Metro Link Bus ==
There is one metrolink, which is the Doha Metro's free feeder bus network, servicing the station:

- M126, which serves Barwa Village (Mesaimeer).

== Connections ==
The station is served by bus routes 109, 119, and 129.
