= Encina Power Station =

Power station in California, US

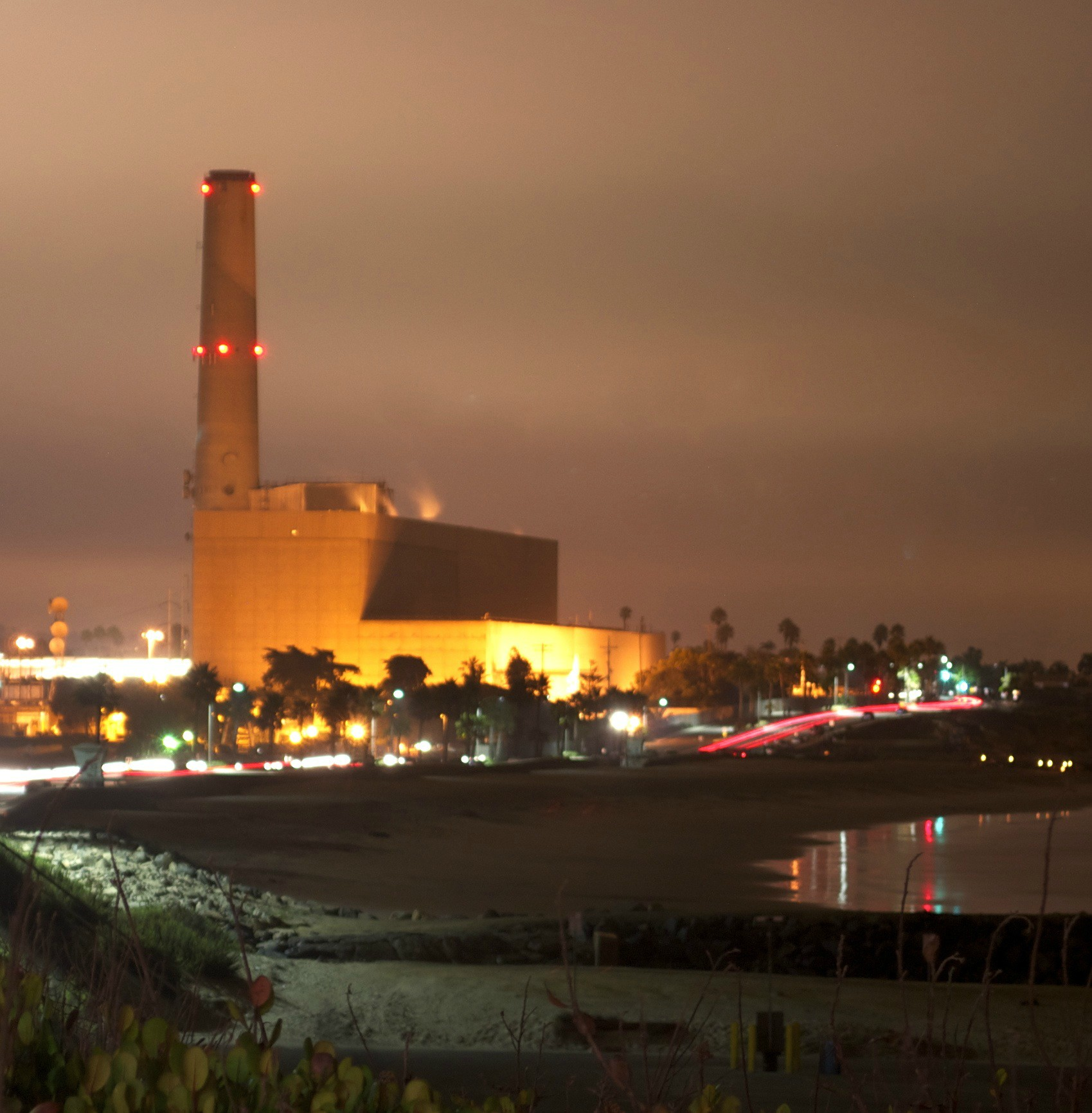
- Country: United States
- Location: Carlsbad, California
- Coordinates: 33°08′11″N 117°20′13″W
- Status: Operational
- Commission date: 1954
- Decommission date: 11 December 2018
- Owner: NRG Energy

Thermal power station
- Primary fuel: Natural gas
- Secondary fuel: Fuel oil

Power generation
- Units operational: 5
- Nameplate capacity: 950 MW

Encina Power Station (EPS) was a large natural gas and oil-fueled electricity generating plant in Carlsbad in San Diego County, California. Constructed in 1954, it was one of the major suppliers of electricity for the region. On December 11, 2018, the plant was put into "retired" status and officially stopped operations. Under an agreement approved by NRG Energy, SDG&E and the City of Carlsbad in January 2014, NRG was to tear down the old plant within three years of its retirement. The plant was owned by NRG Energy.

== Location ==
EPS sits on the southern shore of the outer segment of Agua Hedionda Lagoon; once a stinking pool at low tide due to development of Highway 101, it was opened to a continuous tidal flow to create a cooling system that was constructed along with the plant. Home to blue herons, ibises, and a multitude of aquatic life, the lagoon is attached to the ocean and other waterways through rising tide levels and various small creeks. The lagoon served as EPS' source for its once-through cooling and is also owned by NRG Energy.

In 2015, Connecticut-based Poseidon Resources Corp. constructed the US$300 million Carlsbad desalination plant at the site, adjacent to the power plant. The facility was designed to produce 50,000,000 US gallons (190,000 m^{3}) of drinking water per day, enough to supply about 100,000 homes.

== Retirement ==
NRG had announced plans to expand Encina Power Station with the construction of a new 588-megawatt plant on a plot of land adjacent to the current site. This has been met with considerable political opposition by local homeowners and environmentalists. The City of Carlsbad issued an injunction against the construction of a new plant, but as of the summer of 2010 plans for the new plant were still moving forward.

Sequence of photos showing the gradual demolition of Encina Power Station

The closing of the San Onofre Nuclear Generating Station (SONGS) about 30 miles north led to city officials approving the new state-of-the-art power plant in January 2014. As of May 2014, a gas-fired facility will sit adjacent to Encina Power Station and eventually replace the 400-ft smokestack. In May 2015, plans to modify the plant to a natural gas facility were approved by the Public Utilities Commission; construction is planned to begin in 2016. On December 11, 2018, the plant ceased power generating operations and was gradually demolished between 2020 and 2022. It was replaced by a 530 megawatt peaker plant known as the Carlsbad Energy Center.
