= Free Zone station =

Metro station in Doha, Qatar

Free Zone Metro Station
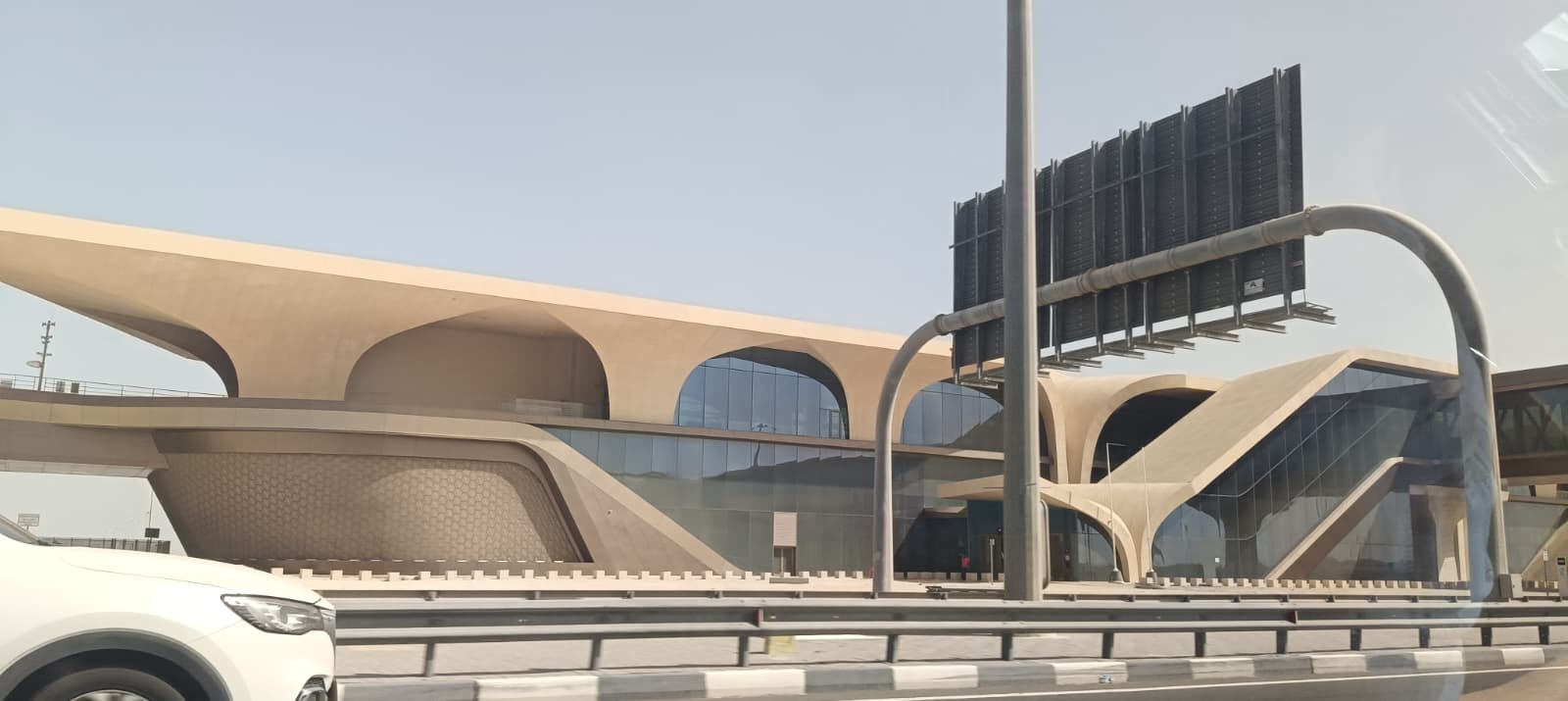

General information
- Location: Intersection of Al Wakrah Road–E Ring Road; Qatar
- Coordinates: 25.22829°N 51.57788°E
- Owner: Qatar Rail
- Operator: Doha Metro
- Platforms: 1
- Connections: MetroLink Bus

Construction
- Structure type: Elevated
- Accessible: Yes

Other information
- Website: http://www.qr.com.qa/

History
- Opened: 8 May 2019

Services
Preceding station	Doha Metro	Following station
Oqba Ibn Nafie towards Lusail	Red Line	Ras Bu Fontas towards Al Wakra
Location

Free Zone station of the Doha Metro's Red Line is in the Qatari capital Doha. It serves the Al Wakrah Municipality, namely Al Wakrah City, Ras Abu Fontas and Barwa Village. It is located near Airforce Interchange, which is the crossing of E Ring Road and Al Wakrah Road.

== History ==
As part of the Doha Metro's phase 1, the station was inaugurated on 8 May 2019, along with most other Red Line stations. The Station was once previously named as "Economic Zone" before changing the name to "Free Zone" on July 2020.

== Station details ==
Among the station's facilities are a Qatar National Bank ATM, a prayer room and restrooms.

== MetroLink Bus ==
There are three metrolinks, which is the Doha Metro's free feeder bus network, servicing the station:

- M140, which serves the Religious Complex in Mesaimeer.
- M141, which serves the Barwa Village.
- M142, which serves Al Thumama (Zone 50).

== Connections ==
The station is served by bus routes 10, 119, and 129.
