= Agua Hedionda Lagoon =

Lagoon in Carlsbad, California, US

Coordinates: 33°08′33″N 117°19′39″W

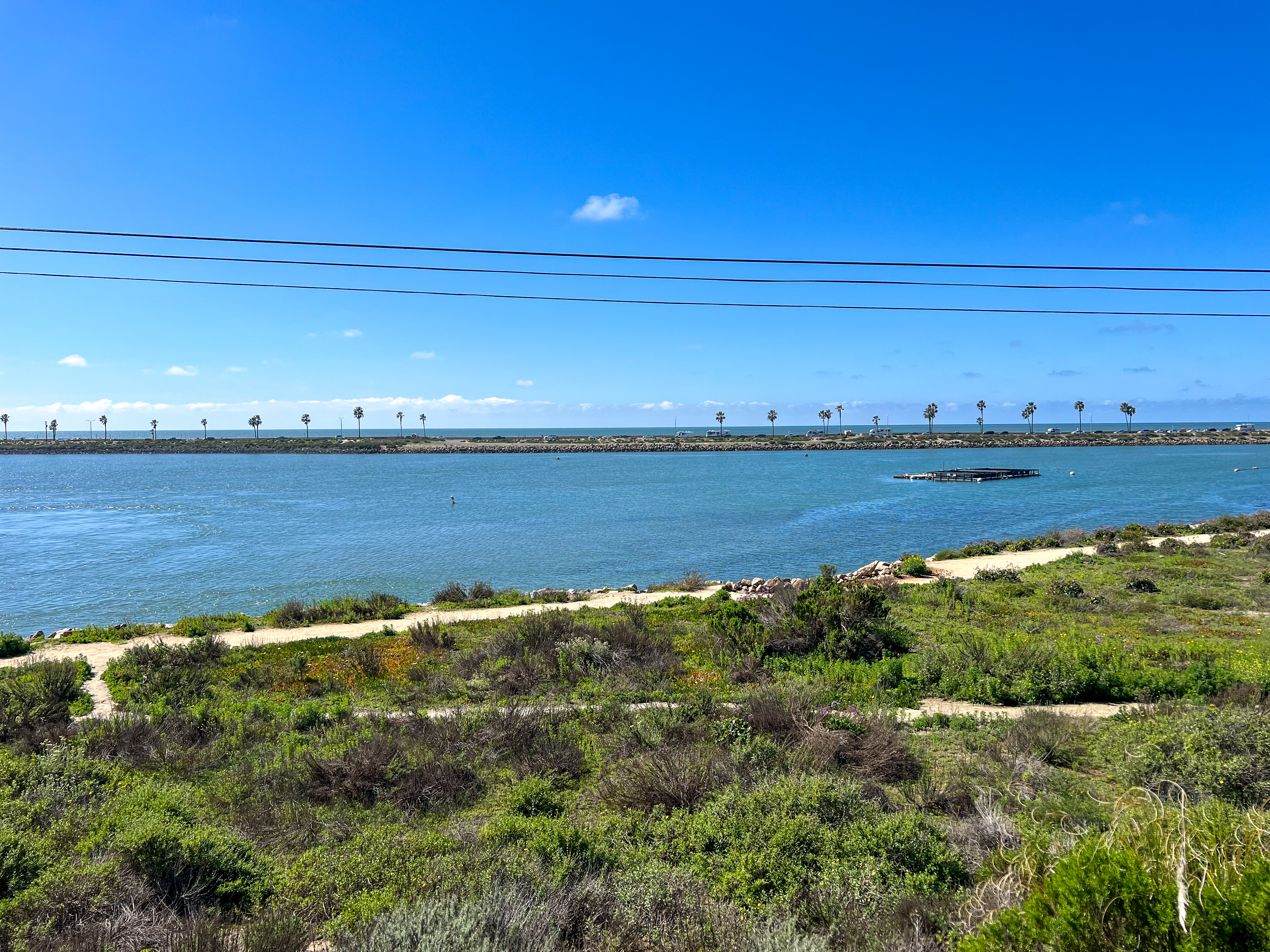
Looking west towards Carlsbad Blvd and the Pacific Ocean

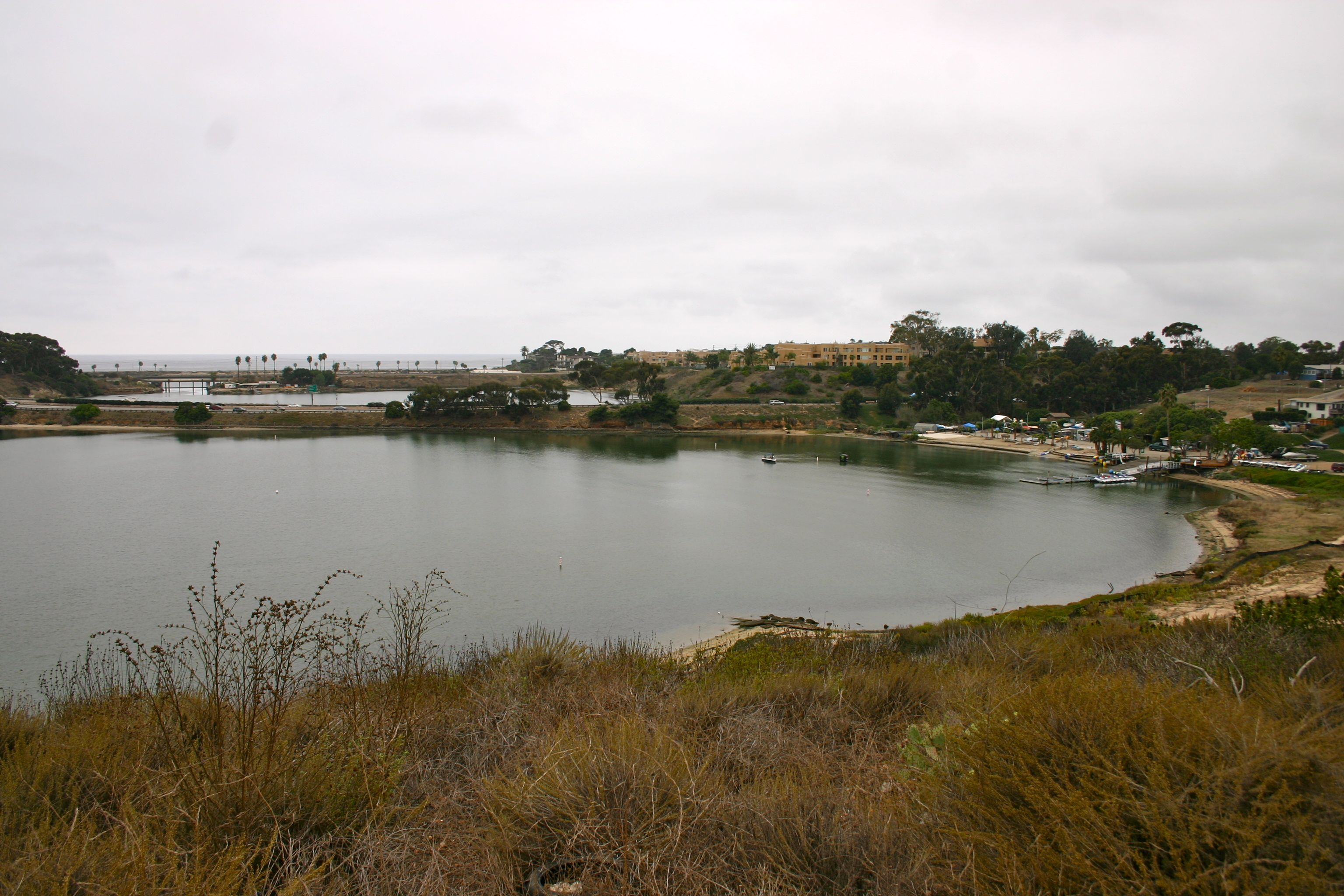
Middle, looking across I-5, the Coaster rail service. and Historic Route 101.

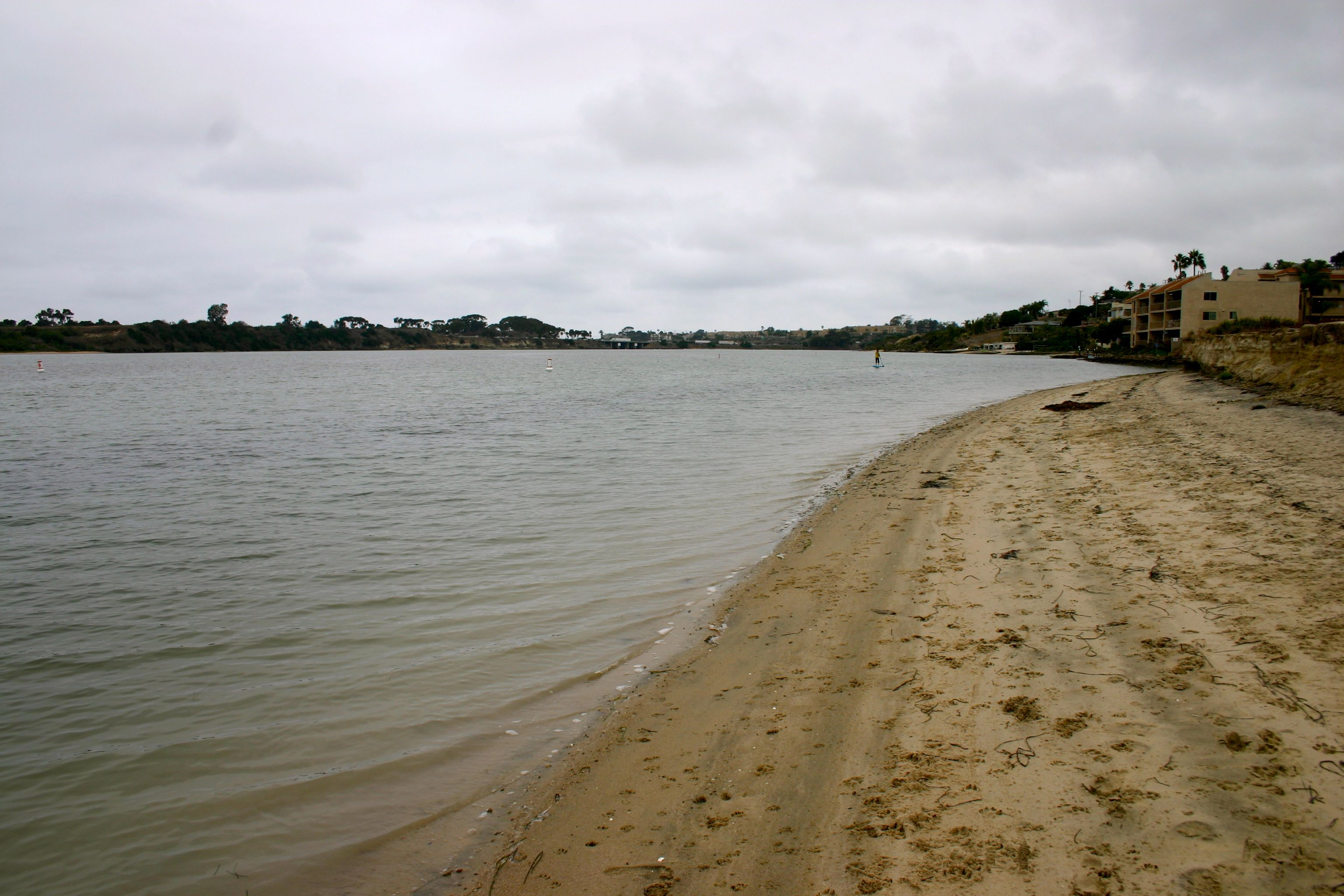
South end, looking north

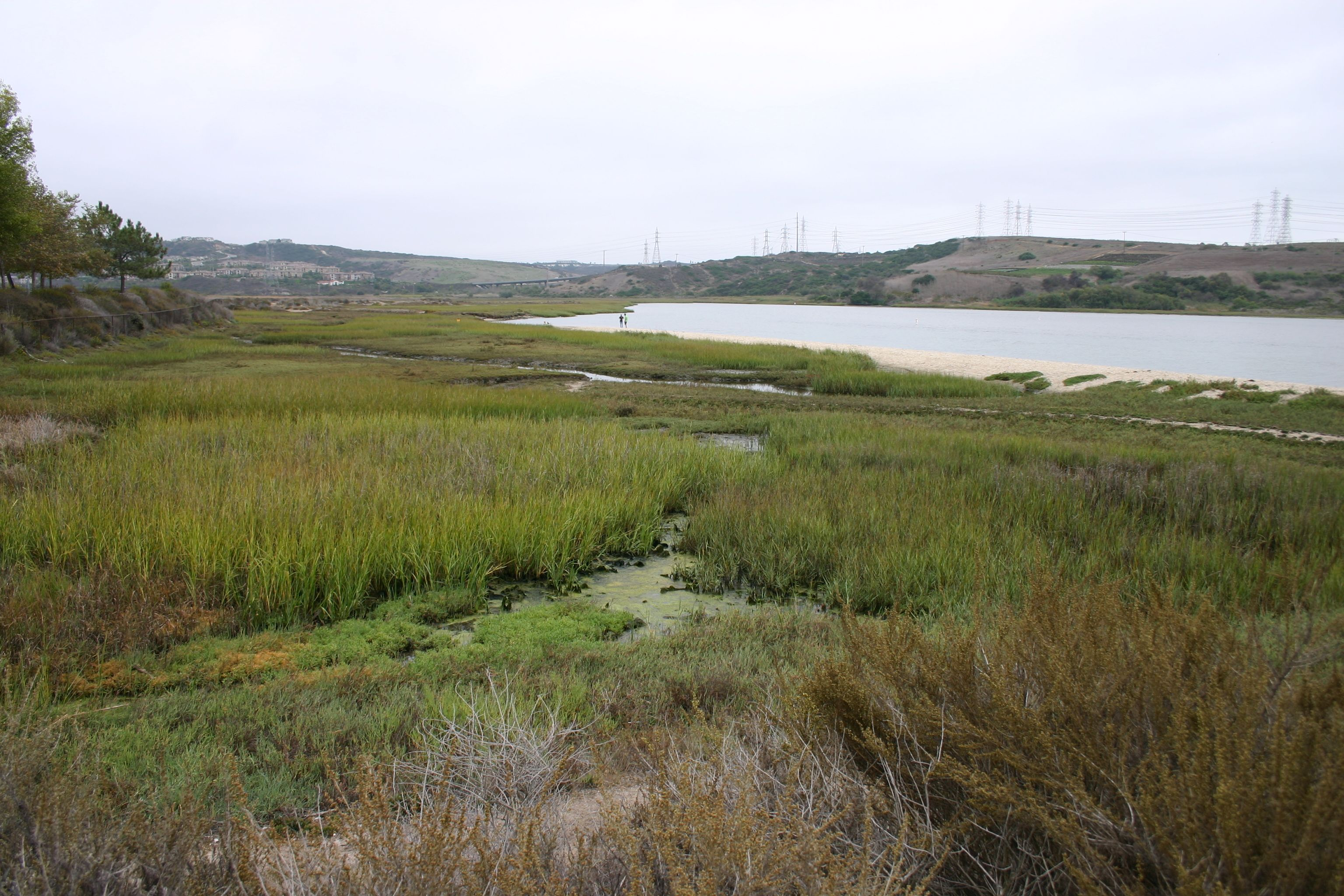
South end, looking south

Agua Hedionda Lagoon ("agua hedionda" means "fetid water" in Spanish) is a lagoon in Carlsbad, California, that is fed by Agua Hedionda Creek. Stewardship of much of the lagoon is held by NRG Energy due to its ownership of the former Encina Power Station. November 2000, Agua Hedionda Lagoon was designated as a critical habitat for the tidewater goby.

== Public access ==
Agua Hedionda Lagoon is open to the public as a passive recreation area. The lagoon is known as a place to walk, and for stand-up paddleboard, kayaking, wakeboarding, waterskiing, jet skiing, and wave runnering. The lagoon is also a public social destination, with events and gatherings. The lagoon sees most of its visitors during summer. Its location within the city of Carlsbad leads to its occasional reference as the “Carlsbad Lagoon.”

Passive Recreation Areas Legal definition: "A passive recreation area is an undeveloped space or environmentally sensitive area that requires minimal development. Entities such as a parks department may maintain passive recreation areas for the well-being of the public and for the preservation of wildlife and the environment. The quality of the environment and "naturalness" of an area is the focus of the recreational experience in a passive recreation area."

There is public access via Bay Shore Drive, which is open for walking traffic from sunrise to sunset. Walking is the primary way of visiting, and vehicles may not drive through when it is closed for pedestrian use. Vehicles are highly limited as it is not environmentally beneficial or safe on the shoreline.

=== Regulations ===
Regulations have been enacted on visitors in order to a reduce pollution on the lagoon, including a prohibition on alcohol consumption. Bottles and cans can harm the endangered species that are present.

Parasailing, hovercraft, cabin cruisers, motorized surfboards, and aircraft are prohibited on the shorelines of the bay. Visitors are also forbidden from leaving vessels on the lagoon. Public events must be approved by the City of Carlsbad Parks and Recreations Department and during these scheduled proceedings, swimming or wading are not allowed. A vessel permit is required for launching access from the shoreline.

==== Fishing and boating ====
Fishing is a popular activity at this lagoon. However, limitations are also implemented. There are designated fishing areas in the lower east end of the lagoon due to algae hampering fishing in other parts of the lagoon. Boats are not allowed to anchor, because doing so would disrupt the lagoon's natural environment and endanger the species that live in the waters. In addition, all California Fish and Game Laws are highly enforced during this activity. There is a fishing license requirement for those 16 years and older. Shoreline fishing is allowed from all public access shorelines in all parts of the lagoon; fishing from a vessel is only allowed in the passive recreation areas.

=== Discovery Center ===
The Agua Hedionda Lagoon Discovery Center is a nature center for education about the local natural history, ecology, and cultural history of the lagoon and surrounding area. The Lagoon Discovery Center has an award-winning Environmental Stewardship School Program aimed at local 3rd graders which incorporates hands-on learning on lagoon history, archaeology, Native American culture, migratory birds, and watersheds and wetlands.

The center also holds numerous free family festivals throughout the year, as well as free monthly lectures and birding hikes. The center opened in 2006 and features a large California native plant garden, and expansive lagoon views. The natural habitat is Coastal sage scrub.

== Dredging ==
Dredging Agua Hedionda Lagoon has occurred every two to four years since 1954. Prior to the beginning of dredging, the lagoon was not connected to the Pacific Ocean. There are 500,000 cubic yards of sand pulled up from the bottom of the lagoon through this dredging. In 2014, about half of the sand pulled out went to a stretch of the beach between the intake and outlet jetties just outside the lagoon. The remaining sand was split between the beach at Tamarack and Oak Avenues, and the shoreline just south of the lagoon.

Encina Power Station, owned by NRG Energy, was located on the lagoon's southern shore and paid for the dredging. The power plant was commissioned in 1954, which is when the first dredging was recorded, and decommissioned in 2018. The Carlsbad desalination plant subsequently took over dredging responsibilities.

Lagoon dredging supports two aquaculture businesses in the Carlsbad vicinity: the Carlsbad Aqua Farm which raises and sells oysters and mussels; and the Hubbs-Seaworld Institute, which operates a hatchery for White Sea bass.

According to Kasia Trojanowska, the Carlsbad Parks Planner, “the dredging puts sand back on the beach so that beach goers have a nice sandy spot to place their towels." Dredging maintains the tidal circulation of the lagoon and creates a larger beach that is free of rocks for a while.
