= Oqba Ibn Nafie station =

Metro station in Doha, Qatar

Oqba Ibn Nafie Metro Station

General information
- Location: Oqba Ibn Nafie Street; Qatar
- Owner: Qatar Rail
- Operator: Doha Metro
- Platforms: 1
- Connections: MetroLink Bus

Construction
- Structure type: Underground
- Parking: Yes
- Accessible: Yes

Other information
- Website: http://www.qr.com.qa/

History
- Opened: 8 May 2019

Services
Preceding station	Doha Metro	Following station
Al Matar Al Qadeem towards Lusail	Red Line	Free Zone towards Al Wakra
Al Matar Al Qadeem towards Lusail	Red Line	Hamad International Airport T1 Terminus
Location

Oqba Ibn Nafie station of the Doha Metro's Red Line is in the Qatari capital Doha. It is Located in Oqba Ibn Nafie street in Doha International Airport district in Doha, Qatar

== History ==
As part of the Doha Metro's phase 1, the station was inaugurated on 8 May 2019, along with most other Red Line stations.

== Station details ==
Among the station's facilities are a Commercial Bank ATM, a prayer room and restrooms. The station also leads to the key-terminus station Hamad International Airport T1 station in Airport City, Doha, Qatar.

== MetroLink Bus ==
There are a total of three metrolinks, which is the Doha Metro's feeder bus network, servicing the station:

- M123, leading to Old Airport and Nuaija.
- M124, leading to Old Airport.
- M125, leading to Al Thumama.
