= Huntington Beach Desalination Plant =

Proposed desalination plant in California

- Interactive map of Huntington Beach Desalination Plant
- Coordinates: 33°38′48″N 117°58′35″W
- Technology: Reverse osmosis
- Website: www.poseidonwater.com/huntington-beach-desalination-plant.html (see additional project websites under External links)

The Huntington Beach Desalination Plant is a 50-million-US-gallon per day (190 Ml) facility proposed by Poseidon Resources Corporation in Huntington Beach, California. The desalination plant was scheduled to be operational by 2023 at a site adjacent to the AES Huntington Beach Power Station. The plant will provide additional water for Orange County and reduce the county’s reliance on imported supplies.

== Description ==
The plant will provide additional water for 2.5 million residents in north and central Orange County. The area currently gets about 77 percent of its supply from local groundwater and the Santa Ana River; the rest is imported. The Orange County Water District has signed a nonbinding term sheet to buy the output to reduce the county’s reliance on treated imported supplies from the Metropolitan Water District of Southern California. Other local water officials such Irvine Ranch Water District didn’t want to buy expensive desalinated water for its customers as there are less expensive alternatives in the county which have not been implemented.

Poseidon Water would lease the 11-acre site (4.5 ha) from the AES Corporation. The similar Carlsbad Desalination Plant has been operated by Brookfield Infrastructure Partners-owned Poseidon Water since 2015. The sea water intakes from the 1950s-era plant will now be used to pull ocean water in for desalination as the AES power generating plant is being rebuilt to use air instead of sea water to cool the plant. The plant would include a brine diffuser system to help disperse the brine in the ocean upon release.

== History ==
Poseidon started looking for a site in Orange County in 1999. After Poseidon obtained approvals from the city of Huntington Beach, the City certified the Environmental Impact Report (EIR) in 2005. The city granted a conditional use permit and coastal development permit in 2006 and prepared and certified a Subsequent EIR in 2010 after Poseidon submitted a modified application. Concerns were raised about the large amounts of electricity that would be required and that the site could be impacted by sea level rise which could cut it off from surrounding areas by flooding.

New seawater desalination regulations were adopted by the State Water Resources Control Board in 2015. In response, Poseidon sought to amend the intake lease with the State Lands Commission in 2016-2017, which had been amended in 2010 to include them on the AES lease. The Regional Water Board, and the Coastal Commission agreed to have the State Lands Commission respond. The Santa Ana Regional Water Quality Control Board hearing in April 2021, that focused on required environmental mitigations, approved a permit for the project.

In April, governor Gavin Newsom stated his support for the plant:

"What more evidence do you need that you need to have more tools in the tool kit than what we’ve experienced? Seven out of the last 10 years have been severe drought.” and that a no vote by the Commission would be “a big mistake, a big setback.”

In May 2022, the commissioners of the California Coastal Commission voted unanimously against the plan in agreement with the staff report that recommended denying approval of the project. Concerns about the project included how raising rates would make drinking water less affordable for disadvantaged households in the county and the significant impact on marine life. The Coastal Commission staff had recommended that an offshore intake be built to draw water from beneath the ocean floor as the proposed intake would kill too many fish eggs and larvae but this alternative was rejected by the company due to the cost. A unanimous consensus emerged from the commissioners' discussion that the proposal for this particular plant was inadequate. Two officials commented that a project has to be cost-effective and environmentally sound.

== See also ==
- Desalination by country
