= Minjur Seawater Desalination Plant =

Water desalination plant in Kattupalli, Chennai, India

Minjur Desalination Plant
- Location within Tamil Nadu Minjur Seawater Desalination Plant (India)
- Interactive map of Minjur Desalination Plant
- Location: Kattupalli, Tiruvallur district
- Coordinates: 13°19′0.77″N 80°20′17.12″E
- Estimated output: 100 megalitres per day
- Cost: ₹ 5.15 billion (€91 million)
- Technology: Reverse Osmosis
- Operation date: 25 July 2010

The Minjur Desalination Plant is a reverse osmosis, water desalination plant at Kattupalli village, a northern suburb of Chennai, India, on the coast of the Bay of Bengal that supplies water to the city of Chennai. Built on a 60-acre site, it is the largest desalination plant in India. Construction works were carried out by the Indian company IVRCL and the Spanish company Abengoa, under the direction of the Project Manager Fernando Portillo Vallés and the Construction Manager Juan Ignacio Jiménez-Velasco, who returned to Europe after the inauguration of the plant to work on renewable energy projects. Originally scheduled to be operational by January 2009, the work on the plant was delayed due to Cyclone Nisha in October 2008, which damaged a portion of the completed marine works and destroyed the cofferdam meant for the installation of transition pipes. The trial runs were completed in June 2010 and the plant was opened in July 2010. Water from the plant will be utilised chiefly for industrial purposes such as the Ennore Port and North Chennai Thermal Power Station. However, during droughts, water from the plant will be supplied to the public, serving an estimated population of 1,000,000.

== Water scarcity in the city ==
Being a city that depends extensively on ground water, replenished by an average annual rainfall of 1,276 mm, Chennai experiences a chronic water problem. The city receives about 985 Million-Liters-per-Day (MLD) of water from ground and surface water sources, against the demand of 1,200 MLD. Due to an increased usage of groundwater, underground aquifers are being depleted at a rapid rate. By 2031, the demand is expected to increase to about 2,700 MLD.

To alleviate the freshwater problems, the state government decided to implement desalination of sea water. Initially, a 100 MLD plant was planned at Minjur, followed by another plant with equal capacity at Nemmeli. A third plant with a capacity of 200 MLD has been planned at Pattipulam, south of Nemmeli to address the overall supply deficit of 400 MLD.

== Chennai Water Desalination Limited ==
Chennai Water Desalination Ltd. (CWDL) is a special purpose vehicle of IVRCL Infrastructure & Projects Ltd. and Befesa Agua of Spain, created in 2005 to design, build, own and operate the seawater desalination plant for the Chennai Metro Water Supply and Sewerage Board (CMWSSB). In September 2005, the CMWSSB signed a bulk water purchase agreement with CWDL to purchase water from the plant at a cost of ₹ 48.66/m^{3} (US$1.03/m^{3}). The water to industries is sold at a rate of ₹ 60/m^{3} (US$1.27/m^{3}). At the end of the 25-year agreement, the plant will be transferred to the state government.

With an installed capacity to produce 100 million liters of drinking water per day, it is the largest such plant in India. Commercial operations began on 25 July 2010, and average production has been 90 MLD.

== Operations ==
Reverse osmosis (RO) technology is employed at the plant to desalinate the sea water, which contains up to 6.4 ppm aluminium and about 50 NTU of turbidity. Energy recovery units help increase the efficiency of the system by recovering kinetic energy from the brine solution and transferring the same to the desalinated water that has passed through the osmotic membrane.

Pre-treatment of the raw sea water includes coagulation-flocculation, gravity, and pressure filtration. The filtered water is then pumped to the plant where it undergoes various preliminary treatments before being passed through the RO trains. The water is then forced through the RO membranes at high pressure. The membranes retain the salts and pass on the desalinated water to the next stage, namely, the post-treatment process. The treated water is then flavoured and stored in a 20 MLD underground water tank, from where it is pumped to the Red Hills reservoir and then released into the city grid.

The RO technology of the plant produces 100 MLD of desalinated water from 273 MLD of sea water.

== Components ==
The plant consists of 8,600 sea water reverse osmosis (RO) membranes, 248 pressure vessels, 115 pressure exchangers, 5 high-pressure pumps, 16 pressure filter vessels, electrical, automation and control systems and 1,200 m of HDPE pipelines of 1,600 mm diameter. The CMWSSB laid a 33 km pipeline at a cost of ₹ 930 million (US$20 million) to carry the treated fresh water from Minjur to Red Hills. The project also included infrastructure for the collection of seawater, including a 110 kV/22 kV sub-station built by the Tamil Nadu Electricity Board for uninterrupted power supply to the desalination plant. Before construction of the plant, studies were also conducted on the environmental impact on the livelihoods of fishermen and other communities and the impact of high saline discharge on the fisheries and turtle nesting.

=== Seawater intake system ===
A reinforced concrete cylindrical intake well of 5 m diameter and 4 m height has been installed nearly 600 m from the shore at a depth of 9 m. A stainless steel screen sits atop the well. The sea water intake pipeline enters the well at the bottom. The HDPE pipeline is 1,600 mm in diameter. It was welded using butt fusion welding machines on the shore before being floated out to the sea and being sunk along the required alignment. The pipeline empties the water into a sea water intake sump on the shore where 3 vertical turbine pumps of variable discharge up to a maximum of 4,000 m^{3}/h each are used to pump water into the plant. The average intake flow is 9,000 to 10,000 m^{3}/h, and the average product water output of the plant is about 4,000 m^{3}/h. The system is designed to work as a self-priming suction for sea water intake.

The plant also has 5 additional intake lines of 560 mm OD as a stand-by intake system. These pipelines have a separate pump house where centrifugal pumps of discharge up to a maximum of 1,500 m^{3}/h each have been installed. The marine works subcontract (involving laying of the intake pipelines, intake structures and outfall pipeline) was executed by Flowline Systems Pvt Ltd.

== Cost ==
Chennai Metrowater purchases water from the plant for ₹ 48.66 per kilolitre of water in accordance with the bulk water purchase agreement with Chennai Water Desalination Limited, a special purpose vehicle promoted by IVRCL. The tariff is high compared to the plant at Nemmeli since the company that has set up the plant also has to add in capital and operations costs. As of 2019, the plant caters to 1 million residents in North Chennai.

== See also ==
- Nemmeli Seawater Desalination Plant
- Reverse osmosis plant
- Water management in Chennai
