= Obhor Bay =

Bay of Saudi Arabia

Coordinates: 21°44′30.74″N 39°7′18.48″E

- (Arabic: خليج أبحر)
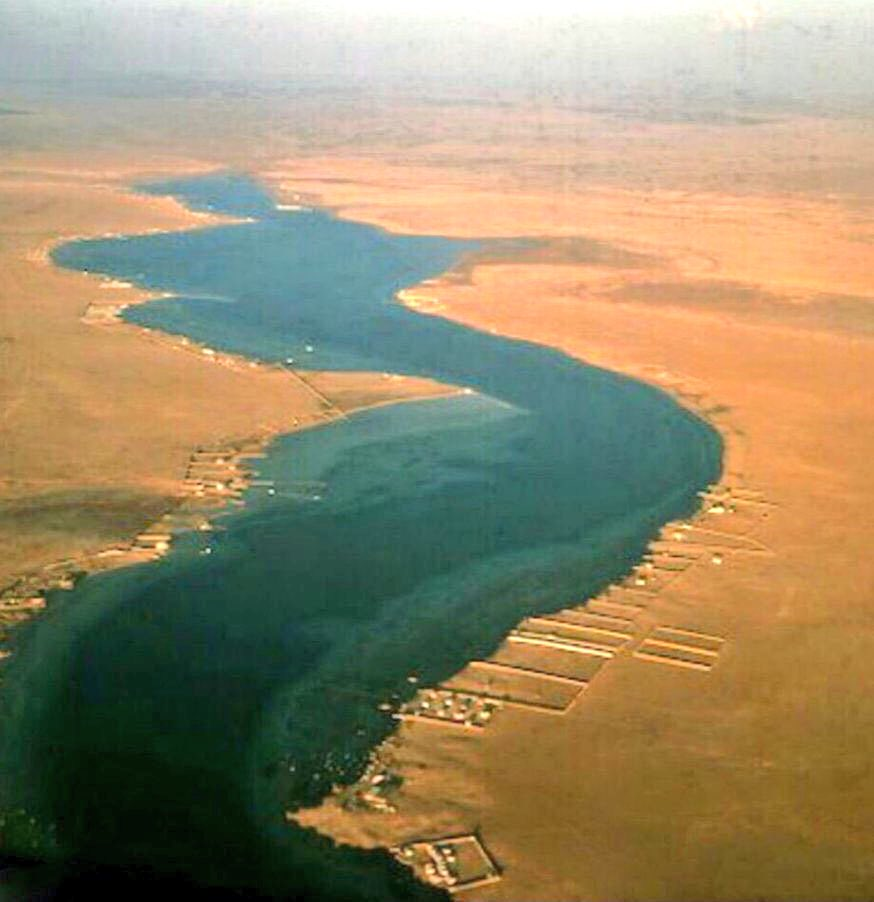
- Obhor Bay in 1964
- Interactive map of Obhor Bay
- Location: Jeddah, Saudi Arabia

Obhor Bay (Arabic: خليج أبحر, romanized: khalij 'abhar) is a natural saltwater bay of the Red Sea located in the northern area of Jeddah City on the east coast of the Red Sea.
