= Akkarai Vattam =

- village
- Location in Tamil Nadu, India Akkarai Vattam (India)
- Coordinates: 10°31′22″N 79°14′23″E
- Country: India
- State: Tamil Nadu
- District: Thanjavur

Population (2001)
  - Total: 1,147

Languages
  - Official: Tamil
- Time zone: UTC+5:30 (IST)

Akkarai Vattam is a village in the Thiruvonam (திருவோணம்) taluk of Thanjavur district, Tamil Nadu, India.

== Demographics ==
At the 2001 census, Akkarai Vattam had a total population of 1,147 with 576 males and 571 females. The sex ratio was 991. The literacy rate was 45.44%.
