= Fouka District =

Fouka District دائرة
- District
- Location of Fouka within Tipaza Province
- Coordinates: 36°40′N 2°45′E
- Country: Algeria
- Province: Tipaza

Population
  - Total: 50,000
- Time zone: UTC+01 (CET)
- District code: 42440,42441

Fouka is one of the biggest districts in Tipaza one of the 48 states of Algeria. Its original name is Fouka Marine because of its seaside location. Its neighbor districts are Bou Ismael from the west, Douawda from the east and Kolea from the south. It has a rocky beach. Fouka has a population of about 50,000. Houari Boumediene international airport is located 42.4 km east of Fouka.

The district is further divided into 2 municipalities:

- Fouka
- Douaouda
