= Ras Abu Fontas =

Ras Abu Fontas راس بو فنطاس
- District
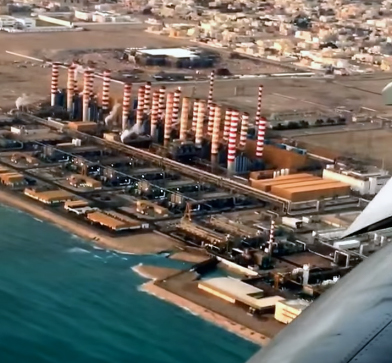
- Aerial shot of power stations in Ras Abu Fontas in 2015

- Location within Qatar
- Coordinates: 25.2057°N 51.6163°E
- Country: Qatar
- Municipality: Doha
- Zone: Zone 49
- District no.: 636

Area
  - Total: 12.9 km^{2} (5.0 sq mi)

Ras Abu Fontas (Arabic: راس بو فنطاس) is a coastal industrial area in Doha on the boundary with Al Wakrah Municipality in Qatar. The government has designated the district as a free economic zone as of 2019.

== Etymology ==
The name Ras Abu Fontas is derived from three Arabic words. Ras denotes a cape or headland, meaning a stretch of land that projects into the sea. Abu, literally translated as "father", is commonly used in Qatar to describe a place distinguished by particular attributes. The final element, Fontas, refers to a water tank. The designation reflects the presence of a large water tanker that once occupied the headland, from which the area took its name.

== Geography ==
In a 2010 survey of Ras Abu Fontas' coastal waters conducted by the Qatar Statistics Authority, it was found that its average depth was 2.75 meters (9 ft 0 in) and its average pH was 7.84. Furthermore, the waters had a salinity of 49.61 psu, an average temperature of 22.51 °C and 26.13 mg/L of dissolved oxygen.

== Economic free zone ==
Ras Abu Fontas Free Zone, overseen by the Qatar Free Zones Authority, is situated adjacent to Hamad International Airport and functions as a center for technology and innovation. The zone has attracted a growing number of companies in fields such as smart logistics, artificial intelligence, and advanced IT infrastructure. In the first half of 2025, foreign investment in Ras Abu Fontas increased by more than 35 percent compared with the previous year, with firms from Germany, South Korea, and Singapore among those establishing regional headquarters and research facilities. Its location offers direct access to major air and sea routes, and investors benefit from incentives including tax exemptions and full foreign ownership.

== Power stations ==
Ras Abu Fontas A was inaugurated in April 1977 at a cost of QR 2.1 billion. In 1983, its 14 gas turbines had a capacity of 618 MW. As of 2018, this capacity has been lowered to 497 MW.

Ras Abu Fontas B power station was commissioned in the 1990s. Daily capacity is currently 609 MW. After an expansion was announced, Ras Abu Fontas B1 power station was officially opened in July 2001, costing nearly QR 780 million. This added 377 MW to the plant's capacity. Capacity was increased by 567 MW with the addition of Ras Abu Fontas B2.

== Desalination plants ==
In 1981, the Qatari government installed eight desalination units in Ras Abu Fontas A, with each unit possessing a daily capacity of 4 million gallons. This capacity was eventually raised to 55 million gallons per day. The introduction of Ras Abu Fontas A1 saw daily capacity increased by 45 million gallons.

Ras Abu Fontas A2 desalination plant was opened in November 2015 after being constructed at a cost of over QR 1.8 billion. It had a daily capacity of 36 million gallons.

In September 2016, Ras Abu Fontas A3 desalination plant became operational, having been opened at a cost of QR 1.75 billion. Capacity was 22 million gallons per day, but after being expanded in April 2017, its capacity was raised by 36 million gallons per day.

Ras Abu Fontas B and Ras Abu Fontas B2 raised capacity by 33 million and 30 million gallons per day, respectively.

== Transport ==
The elevated Ras Bu Fontas station currently serves the Red Line of the Doha Metro, which runs from Al Wakrah in the south to Lusail in the north. As part of the metro's Phase 1, the station was inaugurated on 8 May 2019, along with all other Red Line stations. It is located on Al Wakrah Road.

Among the station's facilities are a Qatar National Bank ATM, a prayer room and restrooms. There is one metrolink, which is the Doha Metro's feeder bus network, servicing the station:

- M126, which serves Barwa Village.

Another metro station serving the area is the elevated Free Zone station, found on Al Wakrah Road north of the Ras Bu Fontas station. The station has identical facilities to the Ras Bu Fontas station, and has one metro link:

- M140, which serves the Religious Complex in Mesaimeer.
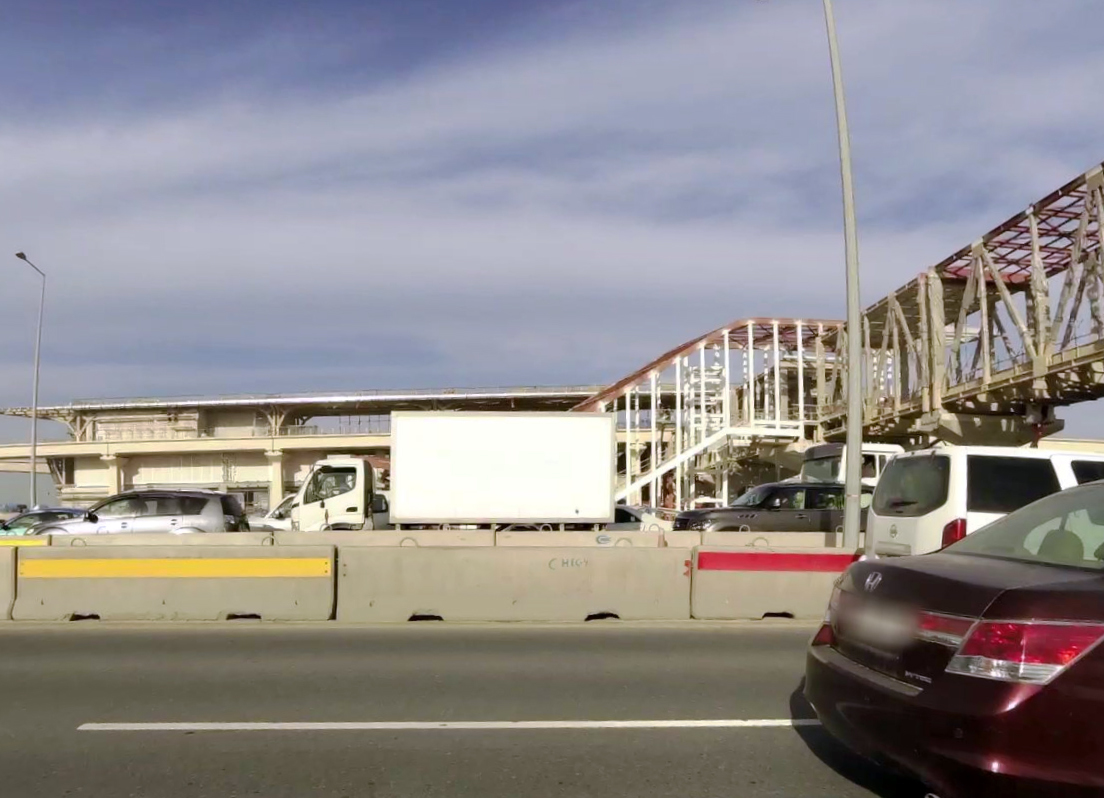
Ras Abu Fontas station under construction in 2017.

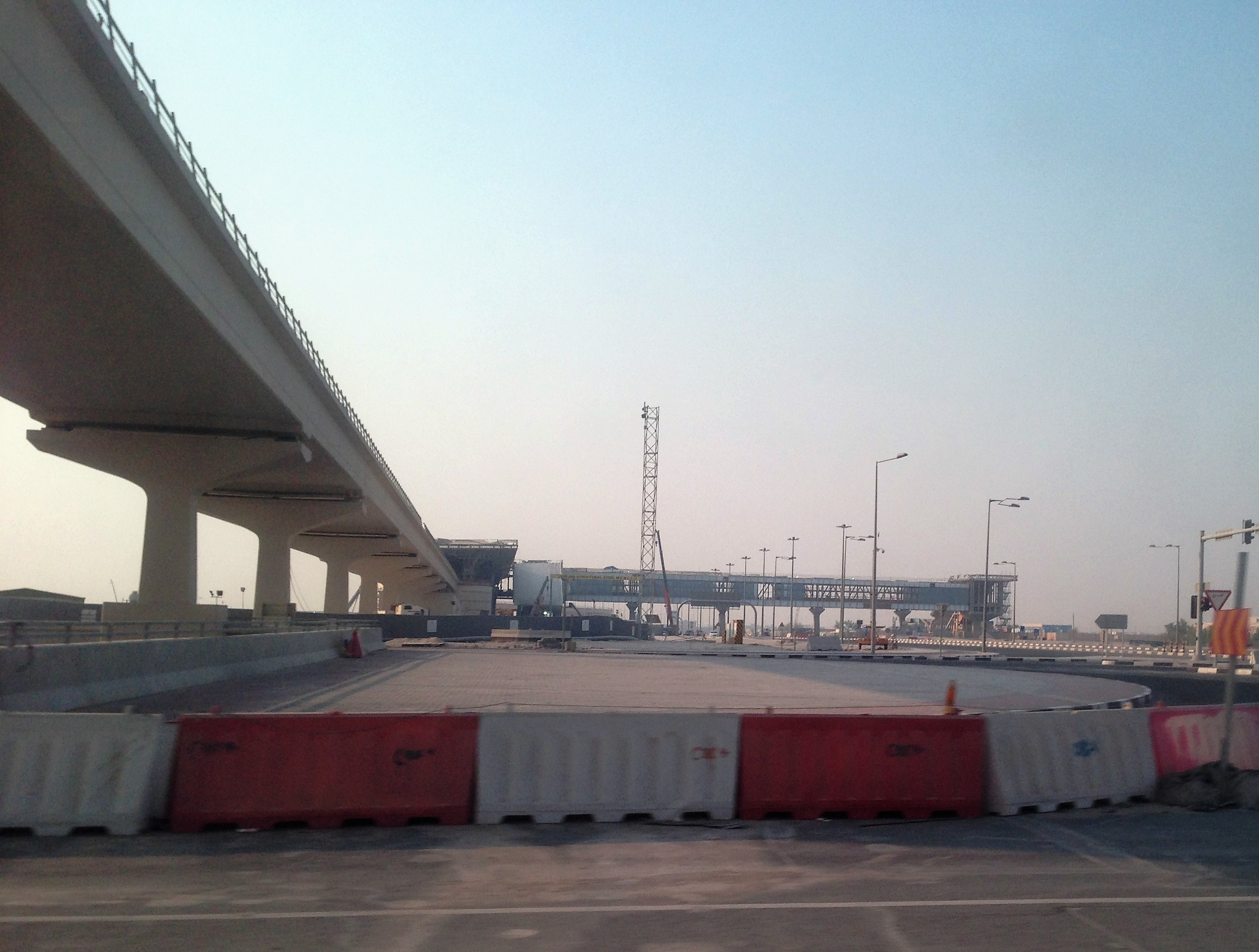
Economic Zone station under construction in 2017.
