= Nemmeli =

28.Nemmeli
- Country: India
- State: Tamil Nadu
- District: Thanjavur
- Taluka: Pattukkottai

Government
  - Panchayat President: Selvakumar Ayyanathan

Population (2001)
  - Total: 1,147

Languages
  - Official: Tamil
- Time zone: UTC+5:30 (IST)
- Postal code: 614905
- Area code: 04372
- Vehicle registration: TN49

28.Nemmeli is an agricultural village in Madukkur Panchayat Union, Pattukkottai taluk of Thanjavur district, Tamil Nadu, India, also known as 28.Nemmeli. Nemmeli village is a division of Musugundha Nadu in Chola Nadu. It comes under the Pattukottai legislative constituency and the Tanjore Parliament constituency. It is located in the southern part of Tamil Nadu. It is 15 km from Pattukkottai and Mannargudi.

Nemmeli Seawater Desalination Plant located in the township has been a major drinking water supply source for South Chennai since 2010.

Tamil is the official language and is predominantly spoken.

== Demographics ==
As per the 2001 census, Nemmeli had a total population of 1147 with 580 males and 567 females. The sex ratio was 978. The literacy rate was 71.1.
