= Water management in Beijing =

Beijing, the capital of China, is characterized by intense water scarcity during the long dry season as well as heavy flooding during the brief wet season. Beijing is one of the most water-scarce cities in the world. Total water use is 3.6 billion cubic meters, compared to renewable fresh water resources of about 3 billion cubic meters. The difference is made up by the overexploitation of groundwater. Two-thirds of the water supply comes from groundwater, one third from surface water. Average rainfall has substantially declined since the 1950s. Furthermore, one of the two main rivers supplying the city, the Yongding River, had to be abandoned as a source of drinking water because of pollution. Water savings in industry and agriculture have compensated for these losses and freed up water for residential uses.

Water tariffs have been increased to provide an incentive to curb residential water demand, but the impact has been limited. Residential demand increases due to population growth, and the city taps new water sources. For example, water reclamation has been aggressively promoted since the turn of the century. The city's 15 central municipal wastewater treatment plants and more than 300 small, decentralized plants now provide reclaimed water for non-potable uses. An additional 1.2 billion cubic meter is expected to be provided through the southern section of the South-North Water Transfer Project's central route from the Han River, more than 1,000 km to the south, until the end of 2014. The supply of desalinated seawater from existing desalination plants near Tianjin is also being contemplated.

== Climate and population ==
Annual average precipitation in Beijing is only 578 mm, compared to 1,090mm in New York City. There is virtually no rain from September to April. About 60% of rainfall occurs in only two summer months. In dry years, precipitation can be as low as 242 mm, recorded in 1869. There has been a long-term decline in precipitation, with an average of only 428 mm recorded in the period 1999–2008. Beijing municipality covers an area of more than 16,800 square kilometers, roughly half the size of Belgium, including the city of Beijing and surrounding rural areas that account for most of its area and about a third of its population. As of 2010 the municipality had almost 20 million inhabitants, up from 10.8 million in 1990.

== Water resources ==
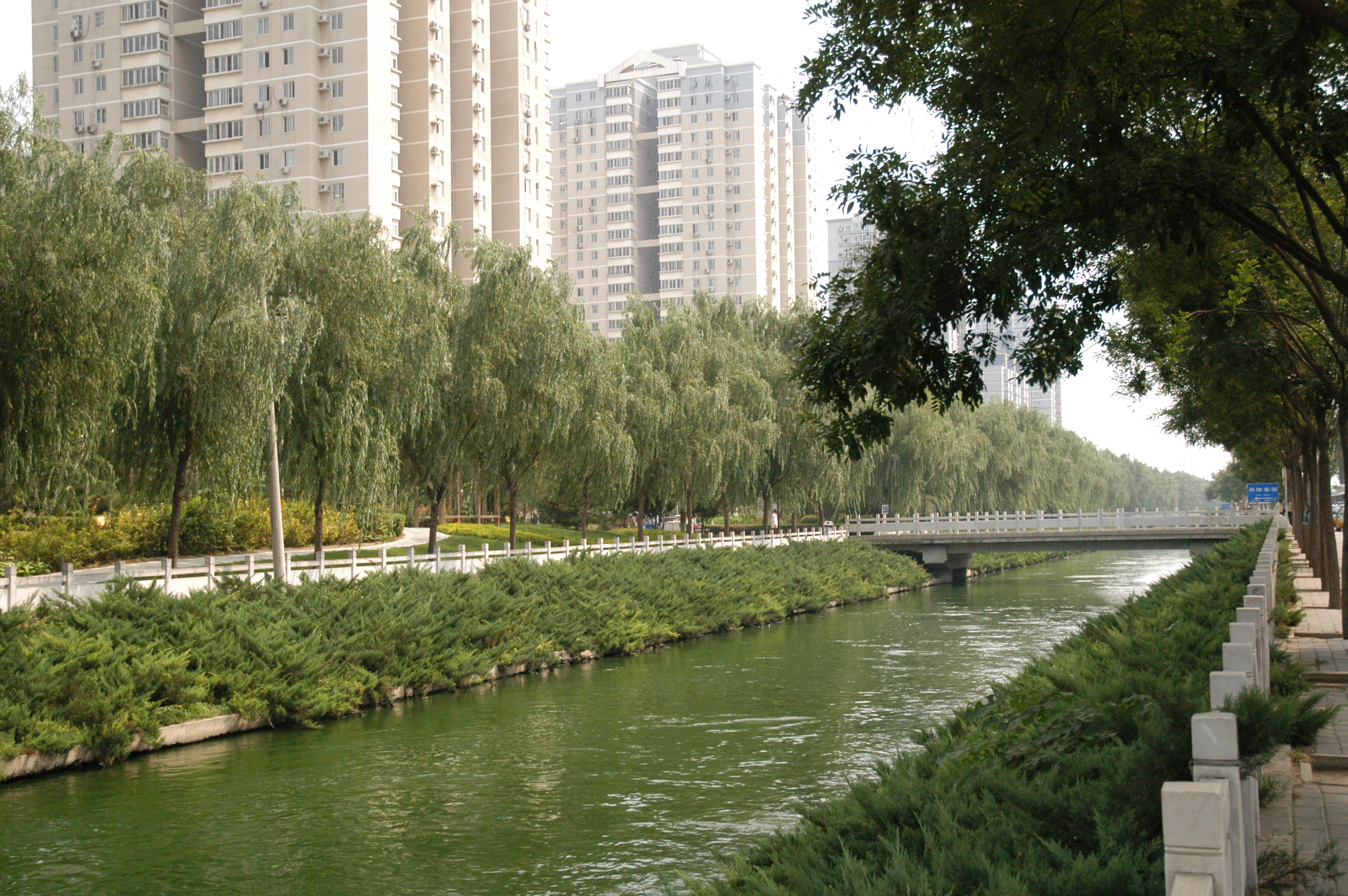
The numerous canals that cross Beijing were once used for navigation and as a source of drinking water. Today they are fed with water from far-away rivers for environmental purposes.

Historically, since the Yuan dynasty Beijing received its water mainly through canals from springs in the mountains north and west of the city, feeding a system of lakes designed by Guo Shoujing. This allowed the city to thrive although it was located far from a major river. However, the yield of these springs declined as a result of deforestation and the springs do not supply Beijing with water any more. They were replaced by groundwater and by reservoirs from dams built during the 1950s in the areas surrounding Beijing as the major sources of water supply for the city.

Beijing has about 150 cubic meters of water resources per capita, making it a water-stressed city.

Water resource	Billion cubic meter per year	Remarks
Groundwater	2.0	
Local Rivers	1.0	Variable
Reclaimed Water	0.3	Estimated
South-North Water Transfer	0.3	Northern section of central route
Total	3.6	

=== Groundwater ===
Today the major water source for Beijing municipality is groundwater, which accounts for about 75 percent of water use. The safe yield of the aquifer is estimated at between 2 and 2.5 billion cubic meter per year, depending on rainfall. Thus abstraction is greater than the replenishment of the aquifer, resulting in a decline of the groundwater table that causes the sinking of ground surface (i.e. land subsidence). In addition, groundwater infiltration has declined because urban areas have been increasingly built up, sealing the surface.

For municipal water supply, the share of groundwater is much lower and the share of surface water is much greater. In 2009 Beijing had 19 water treatment plants, including many relatively small ones that treat groundwater, while surface water treatment plants are much larger.

=== Surface water ===
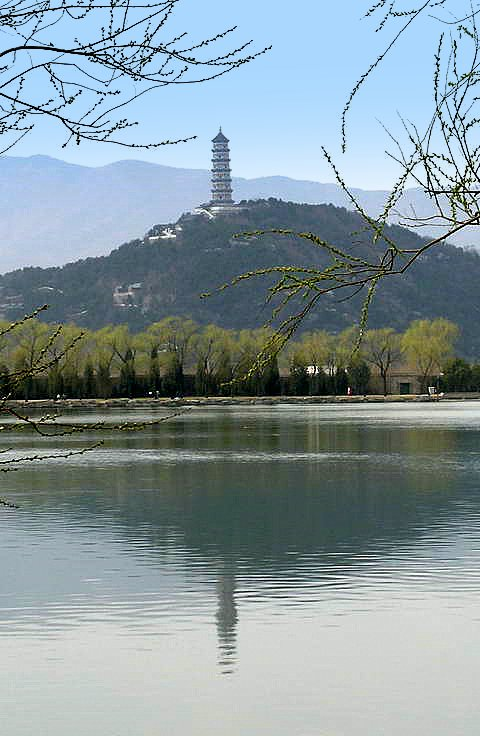
Kunming Reservoir, which is fed from the Chaobai River and provides drinking water for Beijing.

Small to medium-sized rivers provide the remaining water resources for Beijing municipality in the amount of 1 billion cubic meter per year during the 1980s and 1990, down from about 2 billion cubic meter per year during the 1960s and 1970s for all uses, including agriculture. By comparison: The Hudson River in the United States carries almost 20 billion cubic meter in an average year, 20 times as much as the rivers in Beijing municipality. The Yangtse River carries about 600 billion cubic meter per year, 600 times as much.

Map showing the canal that brings water from the Miyun Dam on the Chaobai River to the Huairou Reservoir and the pipeline that then brings it to Kunming Lake and Beijing.

The most important river in terms of drinking water supply is the still relatively unpolluted Chaobai River in the East. It is impounded by the Miyun Dam. The Miyun Reservoir provides water to Beijing over a distance of 95 kilometer, initially through an open canal that brings the water to the Huairou Reservoir and then through a ductile iron pipe and three steel pipes to Beijing. The location of industries near the canal is prohibited to prevent accidental pollution. The Miyun Reservoir is the city's largest single source of water. It also provides water for Beijing's numerous lakes that used to be fed by springs that now have dried up. The dam used to also provide water for agriculture, but in 1981 the government decided that its water would only be used for domestic water supply. In 1986 the first plant in Beijing to treat surface water, the 9th water treatment plant, was established to treat water from the Miyun reservoir. As of 2009, it was Asia's largest water treatment plant with a capacity of 1.5 million cubic meters per day (0.55 billion cubic meters per year). While the plant was designed as a surface water treatment plant, when surface water is scarce groundwater is also treated in the same plant. Because of the higher salinity of groundwater and the hardness of surface water this leads to problems in the treatment process, causing limescale and the clogging of pipes.

The Guanting Dam on the Yongding River in the West is unable to provide drinking water to Beijing since 1997 because of pollution. However, the reservoir still provides water for irrigation and for industrial uses that do not require high water quality. The quality of the reservoir's water has improved slightly in the 2000s, when it was reclassified as class IV from class V of five water quality categories, I being the best and V being the worst. The government aims to improve the quality to class III.

Both reservoirs now receive only a fraction of the amount of water that they used to receive. In the case of the Guanting reservoir, it receives 90 percent less water in 2000 compared to the 1950s. Both rivers are dry for most of the year downstream of the reservoirs. A third river, the Wenyu River, rises in the suburbs of Beijing and is heavily polluted. The State Council has imposed restrictions on water use in Hebei Province that surrounds Beijing, and in Tianjin further downstream, to secure the water supply of the capital. For example, the Miyun reservoir stopped serving Tianjin in 1982 and Heibei province in 1985.

Since 2003 Shanxi and Heibei provinces continuously transfer water from reservoirs to Beijing, following a decision by the Ministry of Construction. No mechanism to compensate the two provinces for the water has been set up. Since 2008, Beijing receives an additional 0.3 billion cubic meters per year from four new reservoirs in Hebei through the northern section of the central route of the South-North Water Transfer Project. This increases the available resource by about 7 percent.

== Water use ==
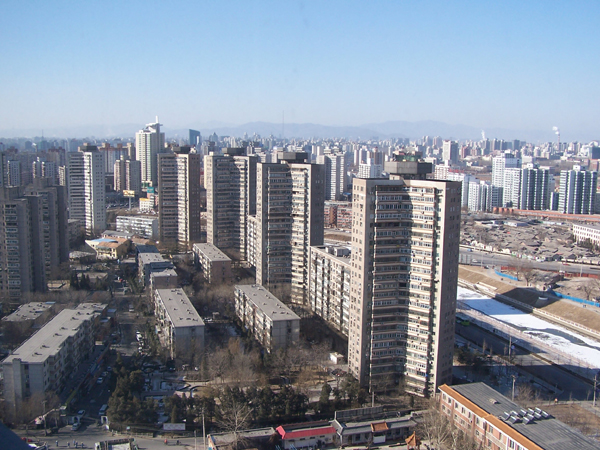
Residential buildings in Beijing.

Water use	Billion cubic meter/year
Residential	1.5
Industry	0.7
Agricultural irrigation	1.3
Environmental flows	0.1
Total	3.6

Water use in Beijing municipality was about 3.6 billion cubic metres (130×10^{9} cu ft) per year in 2010, including 1.5 for residential uses, 1.3 for agriculture, 0.7 for industry, and 0.1 for environmental uses. Water use declined from 4.8 billion cubic meter/year in 1980 to 3.5 in 2002, then increasing slightly to 3.6 in 2010. The reduction was achieved by halving industrial and agricultural water use, while domestic water use increased five-fold from 0.3 to 1.5 billion cubic meters from 1980 to 2010. About 90 percent of domestic water supply is provided by the Beijing Water Bureau as piped water, while the remainder is taken by households directly from wells. Agriculture relies almost entirely on groundwater. When a drought hit the area in the 1980s the government imposed limits on the implantation of water-intensive industries, even relocated some industries and stopped irrigation from the two large reservoirs in the region.

== Sanitation and use of reclaimed water ==
Wastewater collection and treatment in Beijing is mostly through an extensive sewer system and 15 large, centralized municipal wastewater treatment plants. New housing developments, hotels and public buildings are equipped with 300 to 400 smaller, decentralized wastewater reclamation systems with a combined treatment capacity of about 55,000 m^{3}/day, or about 50 times less than the combined capacity of the large plants. The decentralized systems allow the reuse of reclaimed water near to where the water is used and treated. Reclaimed water from the municipal treatment plants is sold at only 1 Yuan per cubic meter in order to provide an incentive to use reclaimed water instead of fresh water. This tariff is only about one quarter of the freshwater tariff and is insufficient to recover the costs of the distribution of the reclaimed water.

=== Regulations ===
Beijing has made substantial progress in the use of reclaimed water for non-potable uses. According to preliminary regulations issued in 1987, when there was almost no wastewater treatment in the entire city, hotels and public buildings above a certain size had to have their own wastewater treatment and reclamation systems, either for grey water or for wastewater for reuse in or near the premises. In 2001 a new regulation mandated the construction of reclamation facilities also for residential areas exceeding 50,000 square meters. These preliminary regulations were replaced with more advanced permanent Beijing Drainage and Water Reuse Regulations in January 2010.

The Chinese water quality standard for reuse corresponds to the Chinese surface water quality standard III (suitable for aquaculture and recreational purposes). It is apparently less strict than effluent standards in the US that correspond to the more stringent Chinese national surface water quality standard II. Another source lists in detail standards for four types of non-potable municipal uses (toilet flushing, road cleaning/firefighting, car washing and construction) as well as landscaping, clearly showing that there is more than one standard for reclaimed water in Beijing. The microbiological standards for the various uses are the same, but the standards in terms of turbidity and dissolved solids vary depending on the intended use. As of 2011, 100 residential communities used reclaimed water in toilet flushing.

=== Wastewater treatment ===
Since 2000, one sewage plant was built every year. Sewage treatment capacity increased from 0.32 billion cubic meters in 2001 to 0.93 billion cubic meters (2.52 million cubic meters per day) in 2008. The largest plant is in Gaobeidian with a capacity of 1 million cubic meters per day, making it the largest wastewater treatment plant in China and one of the largest wastewater treatment plants in the world. It serves 2.4 million people. The plant uses the activated sludge technology and was built in two stages during the 1990s. Since it was the first large wastewater treatment plant in the city, Beijing turned to its sister city Tokyo for help. The Tokyo Metropolitan Sewerage Bureau assisted in designing the plant and helped build the skills and capacity to operate and maintain it.

In 2008 out of the total treatment capacity of 2.52 billion cubic meters per day, about one third or 0.86 billion cubic meters per day could be treated at the standard of reclaimed water. Each plant possesses the capacity to further treat part of its flow for reclamation. The capacities of some plants are not fully used. According to one source, 56% of the reclaimed water was used for industries and power plant cooling, 25% for agricultural irrigation, 16% to replenish watercourses and only 2.5% for non-potable residential uses such as toilet flushing, road cleaning, car washing, fire fighting and the use of water for construction. Only 0.5% was used to irrigate parks such as the Beijing Olympic Park. However, another source states that in the same year a much higher share of 47% of the reclaimed water was used for agricultural irrigation, about 30% for environmental reuse, only 20% for industries and 3% for "urban miscellaneous reuses". A third source says that the 2010 target was to reclaim of 1.64 million cubic meters water per day (0.6 billion cubic meters per year), out of which 50% were for agriculture, 25% for industry including power plant cooling and 25% for non-potable municipal uses without mentioning environmental uses. In 2010, the use of reclaimed water reached 1.86 million cubic meters per day (0.68 billion cubic meters per year), accounting for 19 percent of the city's water supply. By 2015, the total volume of reclaimed water is planned to be up to 1 billion cubic meters per year (2.74 million cubic meters per day), bringing the share of reclaimed water to 28%. The above sets of figures are inconsistent with each other, making it hard to find out the actual quantities and shares of reclaimed water.

The water in Beijing's canals now consists of 75% of treated wastewater. In 2009 a US$5 billion program was initiated to build smaller wastewater treatment plants for new suburbs and to equip 9 existing plants with further treatment stages as part of the scheme for the development of 15 large-scale waste water treatment plants, including reverse osmosis, in order to provide a larger amount of reclaimed water of a higher quality.

=== Water quality in rivers and canals ===
In 2007, water quality of 56% river courses in Beijing was categorized as "up to standards" (class II or class III of five water quality categories, I being the best and V being the worst), which constitutes a substantial improvement. The reduction of Chemical Oxygen Demand, a measure of organic water pollution, was increased from 30% to 80%. 91% of industrial wastewater was reused in 2008. Municipal and industrial wastewater that is not being reused flows out of Beijing through a drainage canal, the Beyiun, which used to be the northern part of the Grand Canal, an ancient waterway. The canal flows into the Hai River shortly before it joins the sea.

== Main challenges ==
The main challenges for water management in Beijing are water scarcity and groundwater mining, as well as pollution of surface and ground water. Floods are also a serious problem: Heavy floods struck Beijing in summer 2010 and 2011, overstretching the stormwater drainage system. Drinking water quality is apparently a problem as well, although the Beijing Water Bureau maintains that the water is safe to drink.

=== Water scarcity ===
Beijing is one of the most water-scarce cities in the world with only about 150 cubic meters per capita and year of renewable water resources. Water availability has declined as a result of recurrent droughts. The groundwater table under Beijing has been declining for decades, forming a depression cone with a size of more than 1,000 square kilometers. In Shunyi county, for example, the water table fell from 6 meters below the surface in the 1970s to 14 meters in 1995. In some areas, it was as deep as 42 meters. As early as 1998, two-thirds of Beijing's 890,000 wells had become useless because the water table dropped too far. There were also cases of land subsidence due to groundwater overexploitation.

=== Pollution ===
The Yongding Reservoir is heavily polluted by industrial wastewater, despite efforts at reducing the pollution load undertaken since the 1980s. However, these efforts were dwarfed by new industrial plants, by lax enforcement and by the construction of dams further upstream so that less water was available for dilution. During the 1980s, the Guanting Reservoir was heavily polluted by the development of hotels without wastewater treatment on the shores of the reservoir, by aquaculture in the reservoir, as well as by iron ore mining in its basin. All these activities were shut down in the 1990s and 2000s to protect water quality in the reservoir. There have been substantial efforts to improve the water quality in the reservoir prior to the 2008 Olympics. There is little information on groundwater pollution, but some drinking water wells had to be shut down for "safety reasons".

=== Drinking water quality ===
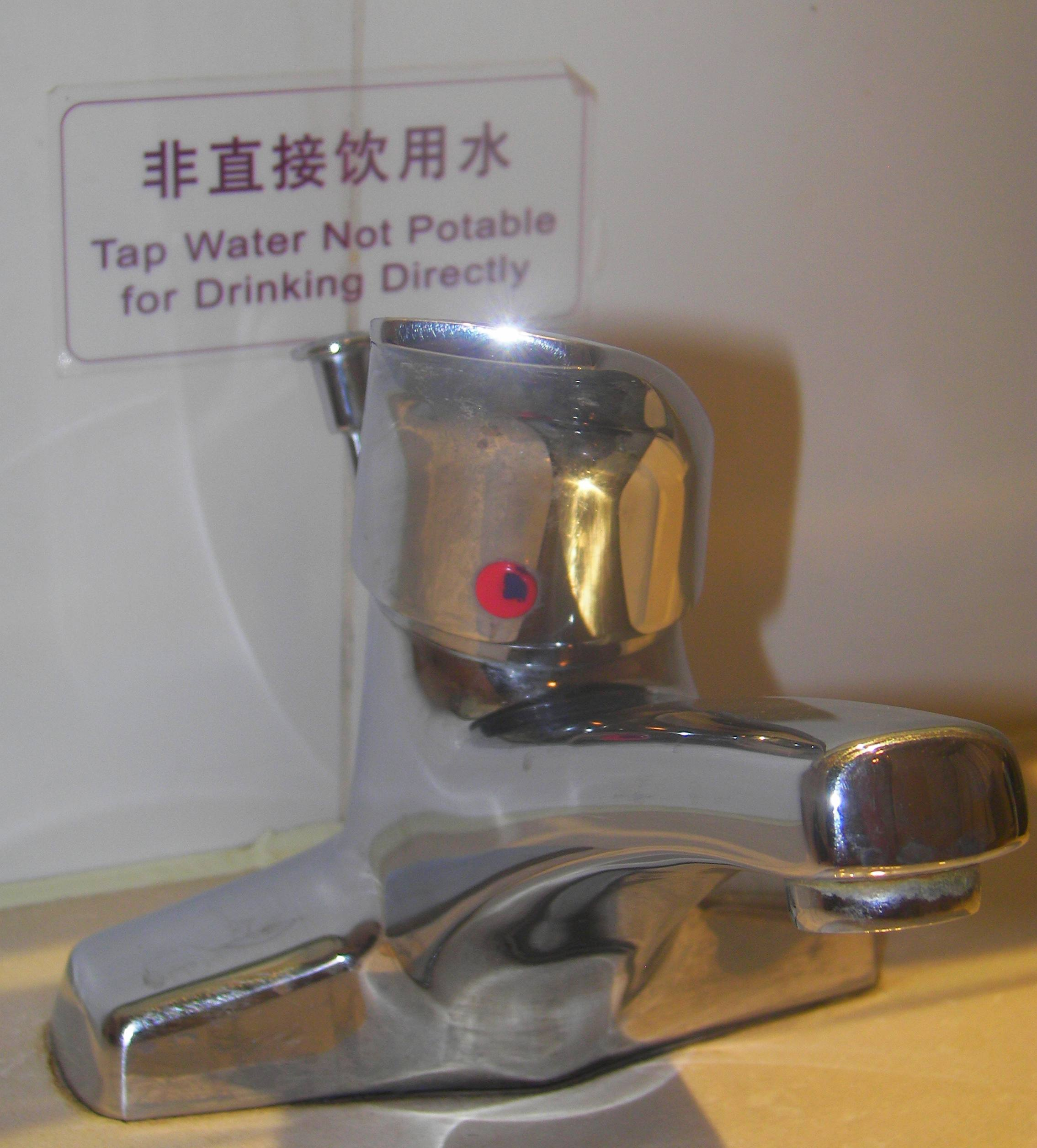
Tap in a Beijing hotel indicating that water is not potable.

"All tap water in Beijing meets quality standards" in 2012, according to Cheng Jing, head of the Beijing Water Bureau. Beijing drinking water quality standards "are based on the current standards set by the World Health Organization, the European Union, the US and Japan," according to Zhang Lan, a researcher at the Institute of Environmental Health and Related Product Safety under the Chinese Center for Disease Control and Prevention. Standards introduced in Beijing in 2006 cover 106 parameters, instead of only 35 previously, including pesticides, heavy metals and organic compounds. Beijing was the first city in China to meet these new standards which became mandatory nationwide in 2012, according to Yu Yaping, official with the water authority.

However, the tests are apparently conducted at the water treatment plants, not at the tap. Old rusting pipes cause a metallic taste and unpleasant smell of tap water in the south part of the city. According to Ma Jun, director of the Institute of Public and Environmental Affairs, drinking water is recontaminated in the old distribution network spanning 1,900 km. Some residential complexes also have their own wells and water distribution systems, which are not under the responsibility of the city's water bureau. Most Beijing residents do not drink water straight from the tap for fear of contamination. They often boil or filter water before drinking it, although boiling will not remove pesticides or heavy metals if they should be present in drinking water. Some filters discharge 3 units of water to the sewers to produce 1 unit of filtered water, thus increasing total water use, according to Zhao Feihong, deputy director of the Beijing Institute of Public Health and Drinking Water. In addition to recontamination in the network, the municipality has acknowledged that some of the wells that provide drinking water for municipal water supply have unspecified "safety risks" related to water quality, but it says they are being addressed through "technical modifications".

== Responses to challenges ==
The main response to the water quantity problem is supply expansion through deep groundwater exploitation, the South-North Water Transfer and seawater desalination, coupled with the increased use of reclaimed water and the restriction of water use in neighboring provinces. There have also been efforts at water conservation, but per capita water use still remains high. Institutional reforms to promote the integrated management of water resources have also been undertaken. The most radical response would be to move the capital to a water-rich area. However, this response has not been seriously considered so far.

=== Deep groundwater ===
In 2004 two new well fields tapping a deep karst aquifer have been developed to secure water supply to Beijing despite a drop in groundwater levels. Three more deep well fields were planned. The total yield of the five well fields is estimated at up to 0.45 billion cubic meter per year.

=== South-North Water Transfer ===
In 2001 the central government approved the South–North Water Transfer Project. The project includes a "central route" that is to serve Beijing and Tianjin. The route includes two sections that are being built one after the other. In 2008 the northern section was completed, including four new reservoirs in Hebei province. They now supply 1.5 billion cubic meter per year over a distance of up to 300 km. In 2009 the Danjiangkou Dam on a tributary of the Yangtse River, more than 1,200 km away from Beijing, was heightened. The additional storage volume is to be used to supply up to 1.2 billion cubic meter per year to Beijing through the southern section of the central route. The section is due to be completed in 2014. However, because of water scarcity in the basin of origin, the actual amount that can be transferred could be much lower.

=== Seawater desalination ===
The supply of desalinated seawater from the Tianjin area to Beijing is another option for the future water supply of Beijing. However, desalinated seawater remains expensive and energy-intensive despite technological improvements. According to one source the desalination cost is about U$0.6–0.9/m3 compared to the cost of U$1.2–1.5/m3 for the South-to-North water transfer project. According to another source, the cost of desalination is 8 yuan (US$1.30) compared to 10 yuan for water provided through the South-North Water Transfer. Tianjin itself suffers from water scarcity and the cost of bringing water from the coast to Beijing has to be added to the cost of desalination. Furthermore, the South-North Water Transfer project will most likely not charge the city of Beijing the full cost of water supply. Therefore, the supply of desalinated water to Beijing may remain elusive despite ambitious national plans to substantially increase the capacity for seawater desalination.

The first seawater desalination plant in the Tianjin area began to produce freshwater in 2010. The plant, the Beijiang Power and Desalination Plant, is a huge 4,000 MW modern coal-fired power plant coupled with a desalination plant powered by steam from the power plant using multi-effect distillation (MED) technology. The initial capacity of the desalination plant was 100,000 m3 per day (36 million cubic meter per year). Less than a quarter of the capacity was used during the first year of operation, because water purchase agreements with local utilities remain to be signed. The desalination plant, operated by State Development and Investment Corporation, was running at a loss. Nevertheless, the state-owned company plans to double the plant's capacity. According to Tan Peidong, Deputy Manager of the facility, the plant will become profitable "within a couple of years". The desalination plant has been supplied by the Israeli company IDE Technologies. It can generate 15 tons of water from one ton of steam compared to industry standards of 10 tons of water from one ton of steam.

In October 2011 the a second seawater desalination plant was opened in Caofeidian, supplying 50,000 cubic meters per day for industrial uses in the Tianjin area. According to local press reports, the plant that has been built by Aqualyng from Norway could supply Beijing in the future.

=== Wastewater treatment and reuse ===
The reuse of reclaimed wastewater is a major response to the challenge of water scarcity (for details see above under sanitation and reuse of reclaimed water).

=== Water conservation ===
According to a 2012 editorial in China Daily, "a lot of water is wasted in urban households, something that can be stopped easily if proper measures are taken." In fact, residential water use is about 160-liter per capita per day, which compares to 115-liter in Germany and 150-liter in France, suggesting that there is room for water conservation. On the other hand, Jiao Zhizhong, head of the Beijing Water Authority, said in 2007 that "80 percent of urban homes had installed water-saving equipment".

One way to provide incentives to save water is higher water tariffs. Between 1991 and 2004, the municipality increased water tariffs nine times. From then until 2008 it has not been further increased, however. The rate for water and wastewater was 3.7 yuan per cubic metre in 2008. This is the highest in China, and more than 30 times the 1991 price of 0.12 yuan. According to the World Bank, full-cost recovery through tariff revenues would require tariffs of 5.0 yuan (about USD 0.75) per cubic metre or higher. Taking into account the cost of imported water from the South-North Water Transfer project or desalinated seawater would increase the costs further and substantially.

=== Institutional reforms ===
In 2004 the Beijing Water Bureau was established, integrating the functions of formerly separate departments for water supply, sewerage, wastewater treatment and water resources management.

=== Moving the capital? ===
As early as the 1980s, it had been suggested to move the capital further south because of water scarcity and sandstorms. In 2000, the then prime minister, Zhu Rongji, stated that the capital might have to move if measures to curb its sandstorms failed. In 2006, Hu Xingdou of the Beijing Institute of Technology wrote an open letter to the Chinese leadership suggesting that the capital should be built anew in central China. Yuan Gang of Peking University said in 2012 that the billions of dollars spent to channel water from China's south to Beijing could have been better spent moving the capital to where the water is.
