= San Diego Coastkeeper =

US non-profit organization

San Diego Coastkeeper is an environmental 501(c)(3) non-profit organization that advocates for clean water throughout San Diego County. Coastkeeper is San Diego's official agency of the international Waterkeeper Alliance, which works to protect the world's waterways.

It has used educational opportunities in schools, volunteer beach cleanups, and litigation against the city to reduce sewer leakage as methods to further their cause.

== History ==
San Diego Coastkeeper was launched in 1995 as San Diego Baykeeper, the 15th approved Waterkeeper program in the country.

In 2005, San Diego Baykeeper became San Diego Coastkeeper, whose mission now encompasses protecting all of San Diego County's bays, beaches, watersheds and ocean.
