= Fouka, Algeria =

Fouka فوكة
- Commune and town
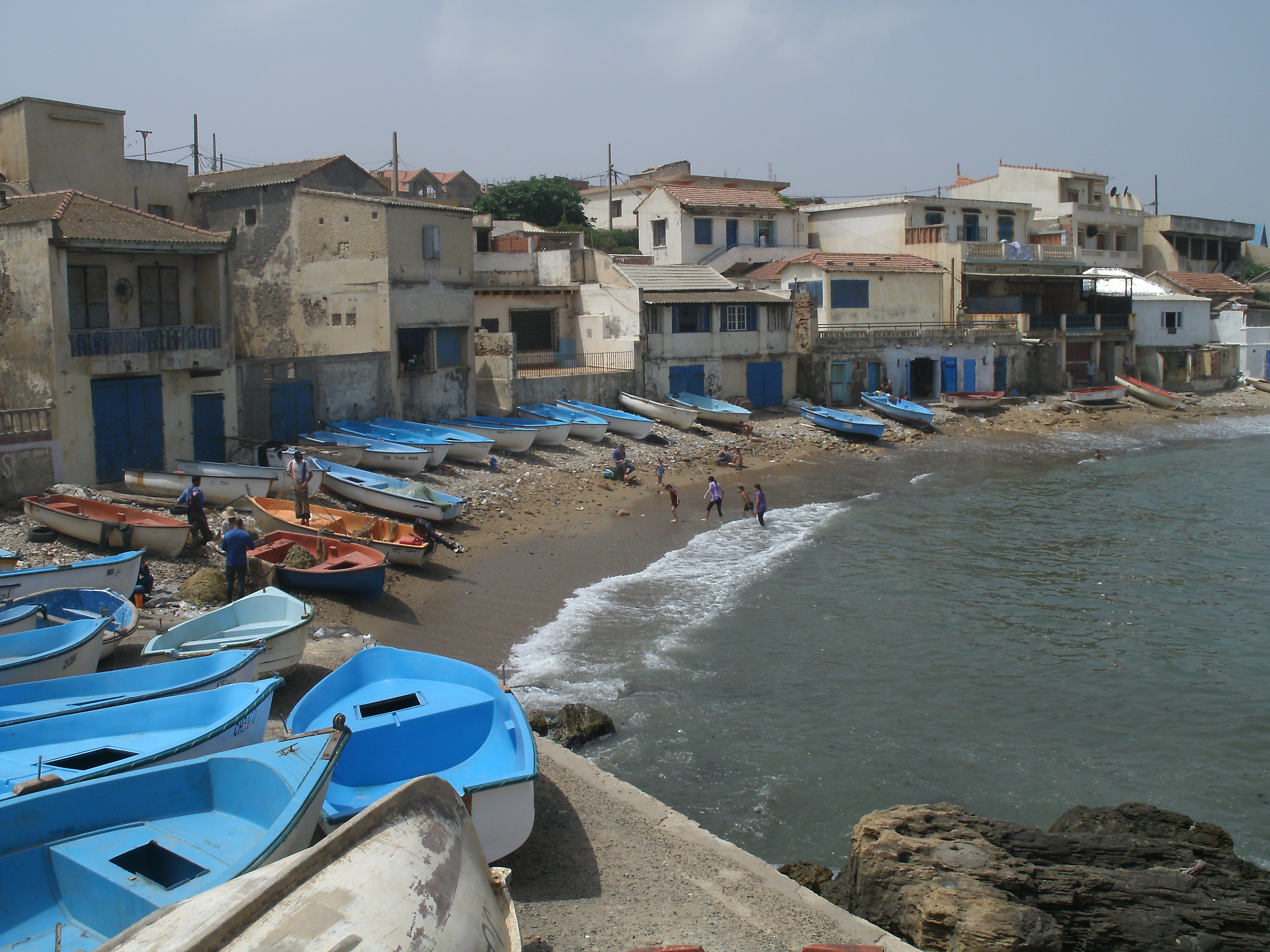
- Fouka

- Location within Algeria
- Coordinates: 36°40′N 2°45′E
- Country: Algeria
- Province: Tipaza Province
- District: Fouka District
- APC: 2012-2017

Government
  - Type: Municipality
  - Mayor: Mohamed Belaidi (RND)

Area
  - Total: 612 sq mi (1,586 km^{2})

Population (2008)
  - Total: 48,959
- Time zone: UTC+1 (CET)
- Postal code: 42006 Fouka Ville; 42027 Fouka Marine

Fouka is a town and commune in Tipaza Province in northern Algeria.
