= IDE Technologies =

Israeli company

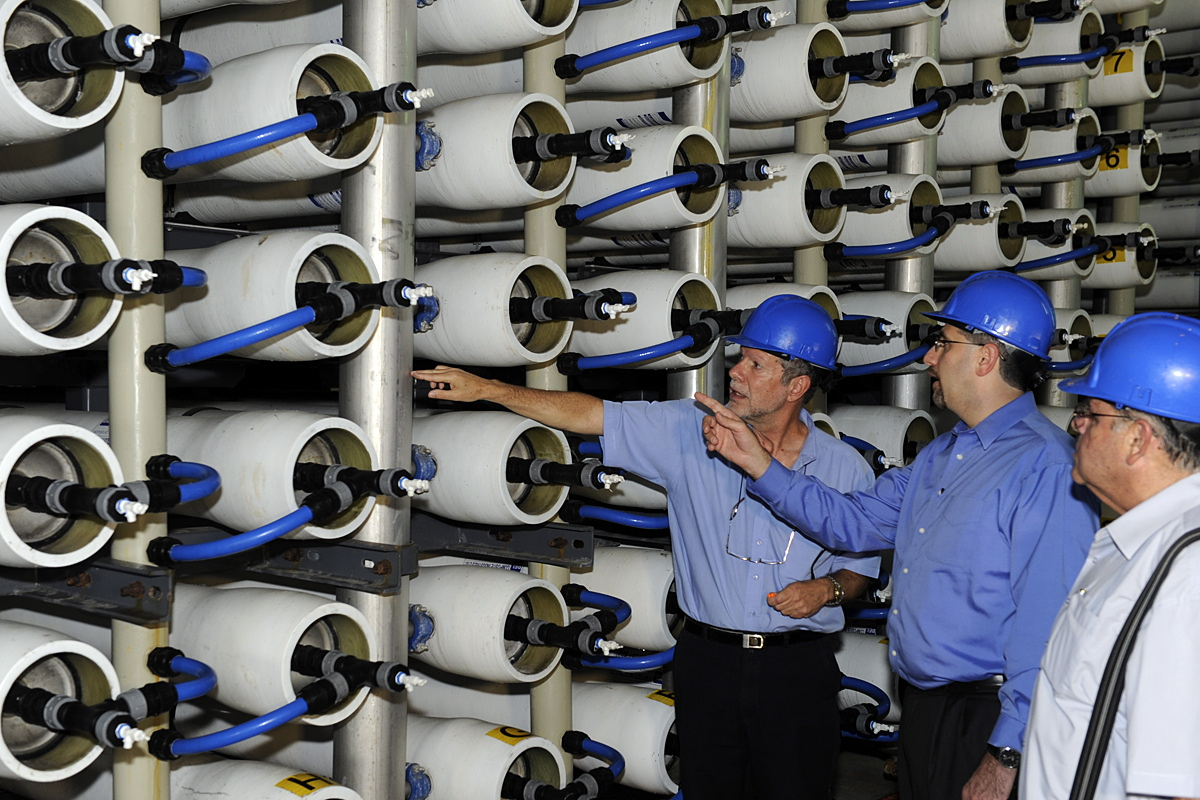

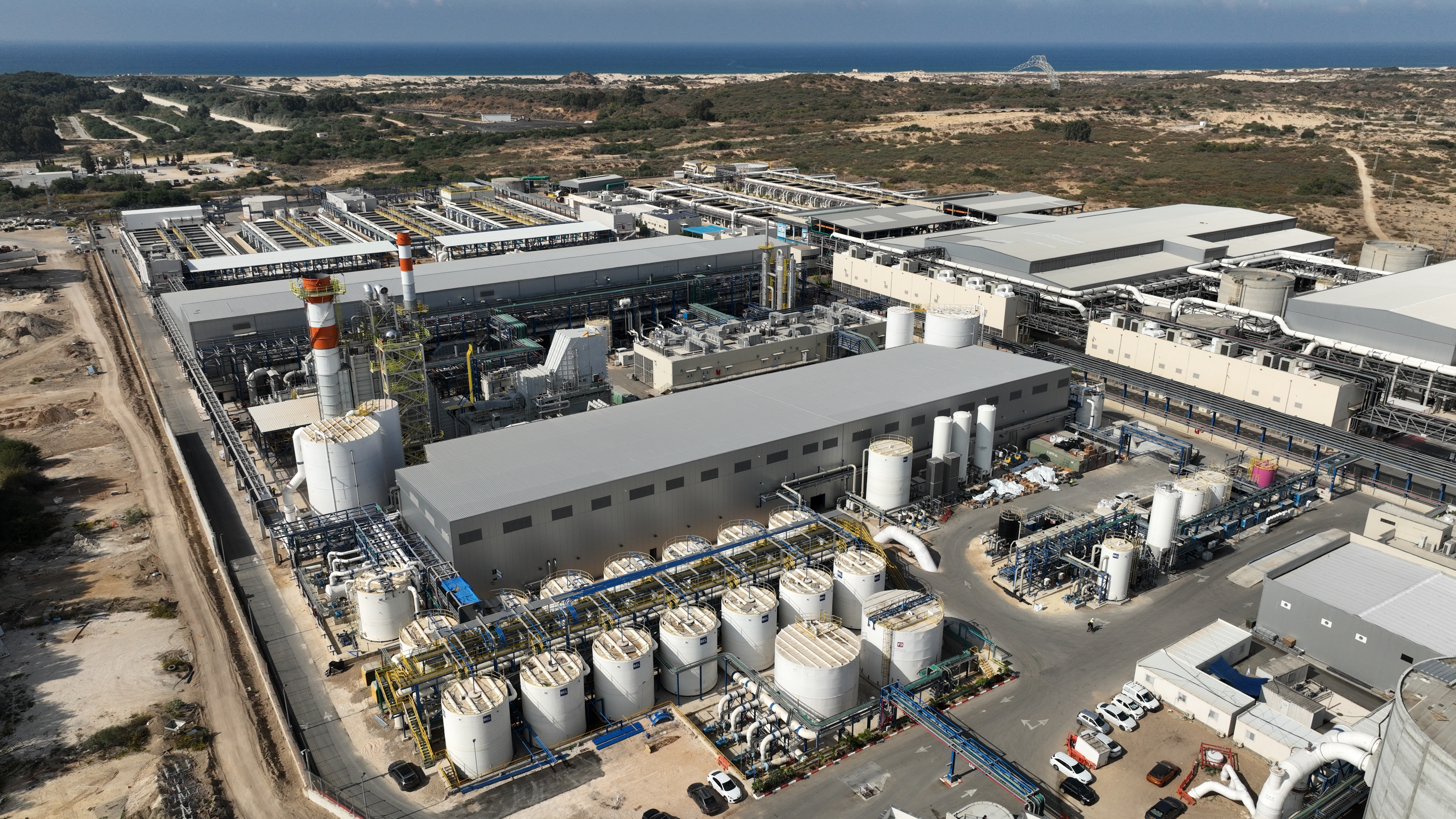
- Industry: water treatment and desalination
- Founded: 1965; 61 years ago
- Headquarters: Hamatechet Street, Hasharon Industrial Park, Kadima, Israel
- Key people: Avshalom Felber (Executive Chairman) Amir Lang (Executive Chairman) Alon Tavor (CEO)
- Owner: Alpha Partners
- Website: ide-tech.com

IDE Technologies is an Israeli water desalination company.

== History ==
The company was founded in 1965 by Ukrainian-born engineer Alexander Zarchin. It is headquartered in the Hasharon Industrial Park in Kadima, Israel. Its chairman is Asaf Bartfeld, while its chief executive officer and president is Avshalom Felber.

In Israel, it has built desalination plants in Hadera, Ashkelon and Soreq.

In 2013, it agreed to design the Carlsbad desalination plant in Carlsbad, California. It was expected to be completed by 2016, however, due to the continuing drought in California, plant completion was advanced to late 2015, and was eventually finished in December, 2015. Other projects under construction include plants in India, Chile, Venezuela and Mexico.

== Ownership ==
IDE is jointly owned by Alfa Partners, a private strategic water fund controlled by Avshalom Felber, IDE Executive Chairman, and Amir Lang, former EVP of the Delek Group.
