= Alexander Zarchin =

Ukrainian-Israeli chemist and inventor

Alexander Zarchin

Alexander Zarchin (Hebrew: אלכסנדר זרחין; 1897–1988) was a Ukrainian-Israeli chemist and inventor. He is most noted for inventing a process of sea water desalination.

== Biography ==
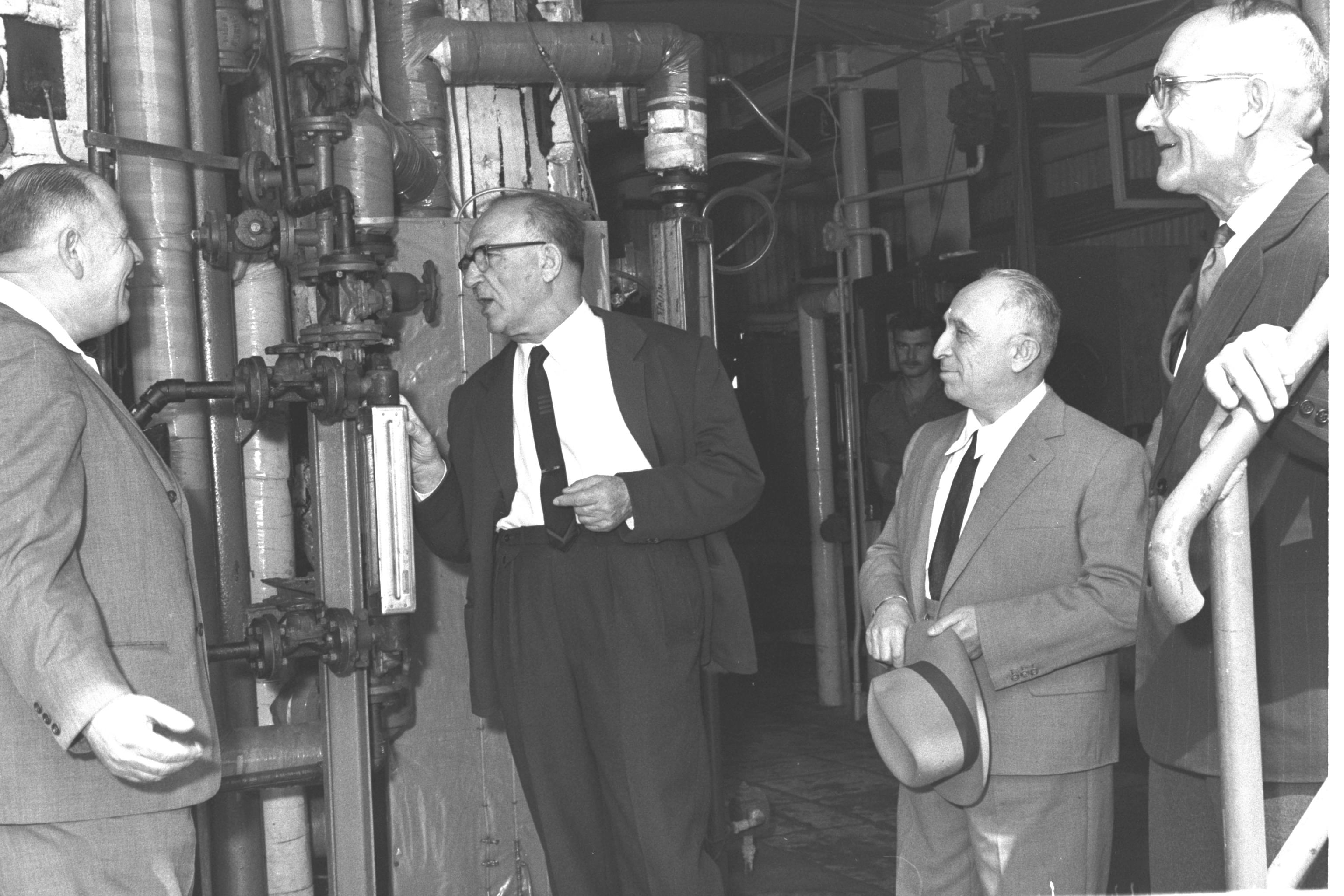
Prime Minister Levi Eshkol visiting desalination plant in Eilat 1964

Born in Ukraine to a family of religious Zionists, as a young man, Zarchin studied industrial chemistry and specialized in metallurgy. In 1934, he was arrested by the authorities for the crime of Zionism (he patented a chemical process using magnesium as "LCLA" an acronym for the phrase "L'ma'an Tzion Lo Achsheh" ("for the sake of Zion I won’t forget you") from the Book of Isaiah) and was sentenced to five years in prison. Zarchin was then recruited into the Red Army, and by the end of World War II, he managed to reach West Germany, and from there he immigrated to Palestine in the summer of 1947. Since his arrival and settlement in Israel, his work was in the area of sea water desalination, petroleum production from bitumen stone, wind operated generators, and other areas.

=== Invention of seawater desalination ===
In 1964, Alexander Zarchin obtained a patent for seawater desalination. Zarchin's method of sea water desalination involved freezing sea water in a vacuum, forming pure water crystals which are then melted to produce salt-free water. The salt is drained off in the vacuum stage. One of Alexander Zarchin's main contributions to the vacuum freezing vapor compression (VFVC) system was the incorporation of a compressor having a rotor with flexible unmachined blades made of thin stainless strip.

In 1965, Zarchin founded IDE Technologies.
