= Dewvaporation =

Desalination technology

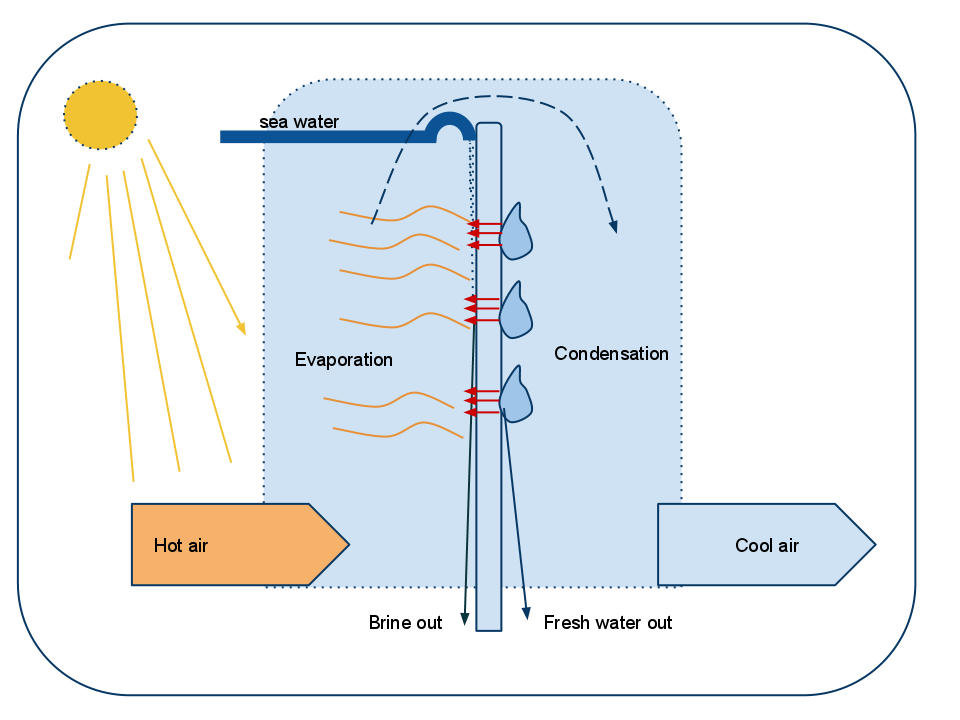
DewVaporator "cell" schematic

Dewvaporation is a novel desalination technology developed at Arizona State University (Tempe) as an energy efficient tool for freshwater procurement and saline waste stream management. The system has relatively low installation costs and low operation and maintenance requirements.

The process uses air as a carrier gas that transfers water vapor from ascending evaporative channels to adjacent, descending dew-forming channels. Heat flowing through the barrier allows the evaporative energy requirement to be fully satisfied by the heat released by condensation on the dew forming side. A small pressure difference is held so that the condensing cooler air is kept on the cool side.

Near atmospheric operation permits corrosion free and scale-resistant polypropylene construction, and also allows the use of low-grade heat to drive the process.

The process is proprietary, developed by Dr. James R. Beckman. Currently, Altela Inc. (Albuquerque, NM) is manufacturing this technology under the AltelaRain trade name.

== Detailed process ==
According to the Bureau of Reclamation, a branch of the US Department of Interior, this process uses simple corrugated plastic tanks with many "DewVaporation columns" inserted in each tank. Each column is made of corrugated plastic and is divided into two compartments. The wall in the middle serves for receiving and evaporating sea-water into a hot air stream, and on the other side for condensing freshwater. The cooling from the evaporation helps water condense on the dividing wall, while the energy from the condensing vapor, now turned to droplets, passes back to the evaporation side, and is absorbed in the evaporating sea water. This way, much of the energy (as heat) is left in the process, and is not removed with the air leaving the DewVaporation column.

Various improvements have been proposed, among those reusing the output brine and adding external heat in a stacked way, so that the pressure and humidity gap between the two sides of the column are optimal and constant.

== See also ==
- Heat of evaporation
- Heat transfer
