= Desalination =

Removal of salts from water

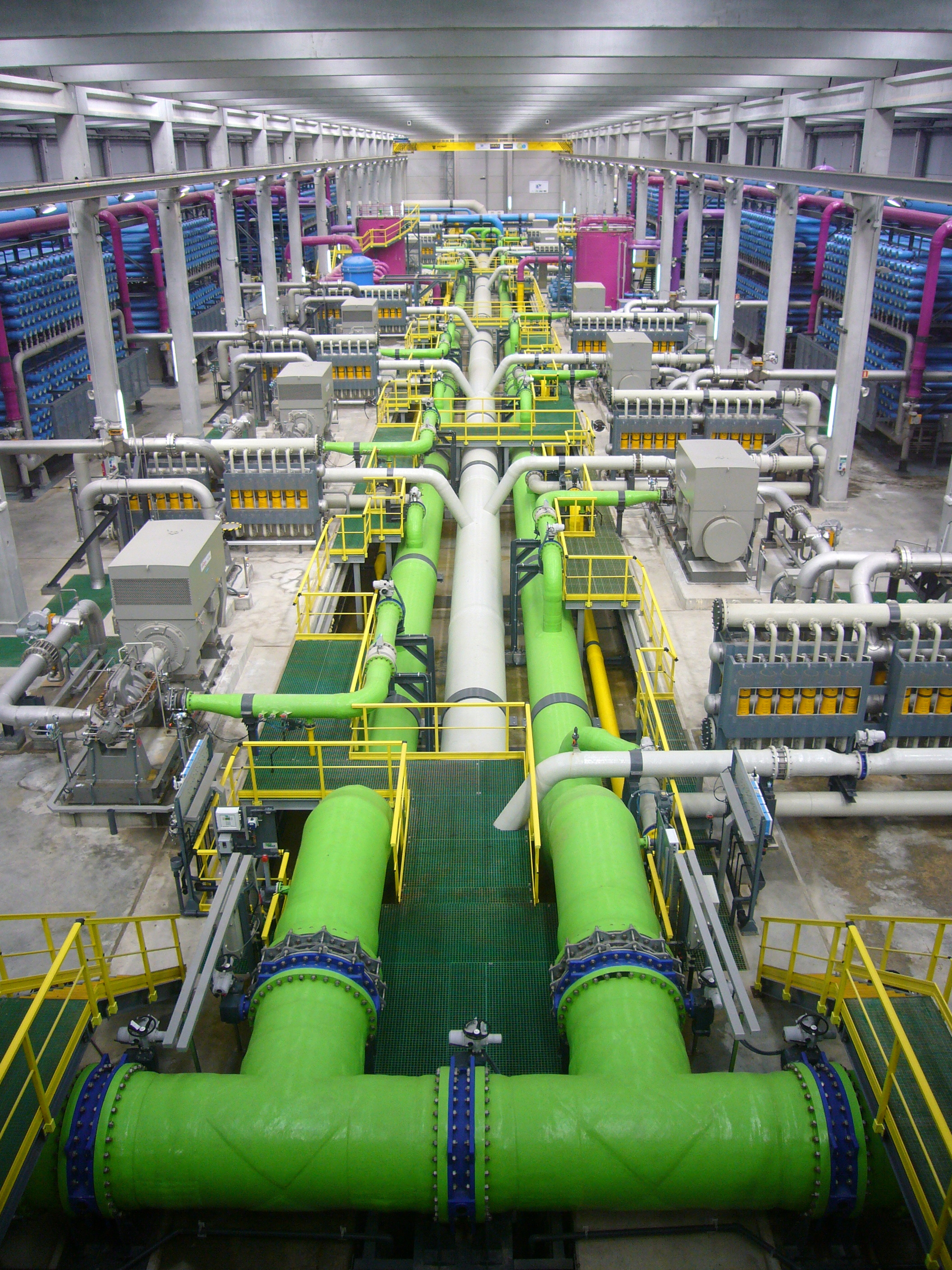
A reverse osmosis desalination plant in Barcelona, Spain

Desalination is the artificial process by which salt water (generally sea water) is converted to fresh water. More generally, desalination is the removal of salts and minerals from a substance. It is possible to desalinate saltwater, especially sea water, to produce water for human consumption or irrigation, producing brine as a by-product.

Interest in desalination mostly focuses on cost-effective provision of fresh water for human use. Along with recycled wastewater, it is one of the few water resources independent of rainfall. As stress on the need for freshwater intensifies globally, desalination has become a key part of strategies for global water security. According to a 2019 review in Science of the Total Environment, around 95 million cubic meters per day of desalinated water is produced worldwide, and the demand for desalinated water is expected to grow significantly to help close the global water supply gap.

Due to its energy consumption, desalinating sea water is generally more costly than fresh water from surface water or groundwater, water recycling and water conservation. However, these alternatives are not always available and depletion of reserves is a critical problem worldwide. Desalination processes use either thermal methods (in the case of distillation) or membrane-based methods (e.g. in the case of reverse osmosis).

As of 2020, global desalination capacity stood at roughly 97 million m^{3}/day from over 16,800 operating plants, with contracted projects pushing total potential capacity beyond 114 million m^{3} /day worldwide. In 2018, the global energy intensity of desalination was about 3 kWh/m^{3} (in 2018), improved by a factor of 10 from 20–30 kWh/m^{3} in 1970. Nevertheless, desalination represented about 25% of the energy consumed by the water sector in 2016. Key companies in the desalination industry include Acciona, Dow, Evoqua Water Technologies, Siemens AG, DuPont, Doosan Enerbility, Toray Industries Inc., and Xylem.

== History ==
=== Ancient times ===
Early concepts related to desalination can be traced to Aristotle, who observed in Meteorology that when seawater evaporates, the resulting vapor condenses as fresh water rather than salt water:

Salt water when it turns into vapour becomes sweet, and the vapour does not form salt water when it condenses again. This I know by experiment.

This reflects an early understanding of evaporation and condensation. He also described how a wax vessel could retain potable water after immersion in seawater, suggesting a primitive form of filtration.

References to seawater desalination also appeared in ancient China. Texts associated with the Period of the Warring States and the Eastern Han dynasty describe how bamboo mats used in rice steaming developed a thin outer layer after prolonged use, which was believed to have salt-absorbing properties.

More generally, examples of experimentation in desalination appeared throughout Antiquity and the Middle Ages, although these remained limited in scale and application. Large-scale desalination, however, did not become feasible until the modern period.

=== Middle Ages and Renaissance (5th–17th century) ===
During the Middle Ages, desalination remained limited and was primarily based on distillation, in which seawater was heated to produce vapor that was then condensed into fresh water. These methods were generally small-scale and used in specific circumstances, particularly in maritime settings.

A notable Renaissance contribution came from Leonardo da Vinci, who proposed that distilled water could be produced more efficiently by adapting a still to a cookstove. In Central Europe, distillation techniques also continued to develop during this period, although not always specifically for desalination.

Historical accounts from the 16th century describe the use of desalination devices under emergency conditions. One example may have occurred in 1560 on an island off the coast of Tunisia, where a besieged Spanish garrison reportedly constructed a still to produce fresh water, although technical details of the apparatus are not known.

=== Pre-industrial and early modern period (16th–18th century) ===
Before the Industrial Revolution, desalination was mainly used aboard oceangoing ships, where access to fresh water was essential for long voyages. Shipboard distillation was used to supplement stored supplies when necessary.

Interest in desalination increased during the 17th century. Figures such as Francis Bacon and Walter Raleigh discussed methods of water purification, while Sir Richard Hawkins reported supplying his crew with fresh water by distilling seawater aboard ship.

This growing interest was reflected in the first patents for desalination apparatus. Patents were granted in 1675 and 1683 to William Walcot and Robert Fitzgerald and others, respectively, although neither invention entered widespread service because of difficulties in scaling the technology.

Throughout this period, progress remained gradual, and no major improvements to the basic distillation process were recorded between the mid-17th century and the end of the 18th century.

When the frigate Protector was sold to Denmark in the 1780s and renamed Hussaren, its distillation apparatus was studied and documented in detail. In the United States, Thomas Jefferson later compiled earlier heat-based desalination methods and circulated practical guidance for their maritime use.

=== Industrial era (19th century) ===
Desalination methods changed significantly from the beginning of the 19th century with the spread of the steam engine and advances in thermodynamics. The growing demand for pure water for steam boilers, together with the expansion of European colonialism into arid regions, created favorable conditions for the further development of desalination technologies.

More efficient thermal systems, including multiple-effect evaporators, were introduced, allowing heat to be reused across several stages. In 1852, Alphonse René le Mire de Normandy patented a vertical-tube seawater distillation unit that became widely used, particularly in maritime applications, because of its relatively simple design and ease of construction.

By the second half of the 19th century, land-based desalination plants had begun to appear more frequently. In the 1860s, the U.S. Army installed Normandy evaporators in Key West and Dry Tortugas. In the 1880s, another plant was installed at Suakin to provide fresh water for British troops, using six-effect distillation.

=== 20th century ===
Desalination technology advanced significantly after World War II. Thermal methods such as multi-effect flash and multi-stage flash desalination were developed and widely implemented, particularly in regions with limited freshwater resources. Freeze–thaw desalination also emerged as an alternative approach based on crystallization processes.

In 1955, the Office of Saline Water was established within the United States Department of the Interior to promote research and development in desalination. These efforts contributed to the construction of distillation and electrodialysis plants and encouraged international cooperation in the field.

One of the most important developments of the 20th century was reverse osmosis (RO), a membrane-based process in which pressure forces saline water through a semi-permeable membrane that retains dissolved salts. By the late 1960s and early 1970s, RO had emerged as a promising alternative to thermal desalination. Research was carried out at universities in California and by companies including Dow Chemical Company and DuPont.

The first industrial desalination plant in the United States opened in Freeport, Texas, in 1961 after a prolonged regional drought. The first commercial RO plant for brackish water was inaugurated in California in 1965. Sidney Loeb and colleagues at the University of California, Los Angeles helped develop large pilot systems that demonstrated the feasibility of RO for municipal water supply. In 1975, the first seawater reverse osmosis desalination plant came into operation.

=== 21st century and modern developments ===
Since the early 21st century, desalination capacity has expanded rapidly, with thousands of plants operating worldwide, particularly in the Middle East. Reverse osmosis has become the dominant desalination technology because of its scalability and energy performance.

Research in the 21st century has focused increasingly on efficiency and sustainability. This has included the integration of renewable energy sources such as solar and wind power into desalination systems, as well as the development of advanced membranes including graphene-based, biomimetic, ceramic, and nanocomposite materials.

As of 2021, about 22,000 desalination plants were reported to be in operation worldwide.

== Applications ==
External audio
- "Making the Deserts Bloom: Harnessing nature to deliver us from drought", Distillations Podcast and transcript, Episode 239, March 19, 2019, Science History Institute

A schematic of a multistage flash desalinator A – steam in B – seawater in C – potable water out D – brine out (waste) E – condensate out F – heat exchange G – condensation collection (desalinated water) H – brine heater The pressure vessel acts as a countercurrent heat exchanger. A vacuum pump lowers the pressure in the vessel to facilitate the evaporation of the heated seawater (brine) which enters the vessel from the right side (darker shades indicate lower temperature). The steam condenses on the pipes on top of the vessel in which the fresh sea water moves from the left to the right.

There are now about 21,000 desalination plants in operation around the globe. The biggest ones are in the United Arab Emirates, Saudi Arabia, and Israel. The world's largest desalination plant is located in Saudi Arabia (Ras Al-Khair Power and Desalination Plant) with a capacity of 1,401,000 cubic meters per day.

Desalination is currently expensive compared to most alternative sources of water, and only a very small fraction of total human use is satisfied by desalination. It is usually only economically practical for high-valued uses (such as household and industrial uses) in arid areas. However, there is growth in desalination for agricultural use for soil desalination. Many seagoing ships and submarines also use desalination. The most extensive use is in highly populated areas such as Singapore or California. and especially in the Persian Gulf.

Energy cost in desalination processes varies considerably depending on water salinity, plant size and process type. At present the cost of seawater desalination, for example, is higher than traditional water sources, but it is expected that costs will continue to decrease with technology improvements that include, but are not limited to, improved efficiency, reduction in plant footprint, improvements to plant operation and optimization, more effective feed pre-treatment, and lower cost energy sources.

While noting costs are falling, and generally positive about the technology for affluent areas in proximity to oceans, a 2005 study argued, "Desalinated water may be a solution for some water-stress regions, but not for places that are poor, deep in the interior of a continent, or at high elevation. Unfortunately, that includes some of the places with the biggest water problems.", and, "Indeed, one needs to lift the water by 2000 m, or transport it over more than 1600 km to get transport costs equal to the desalination costs."

Thus, it may be more economical to transport fresh water from somewhere else than to desalinate it. In places far from the sea, like New Delhi, or in high places, like Mexico City, transport costs could match desalination costs. Desalinated water is also expensive in places that are both somewhat far from the sea and somewhat high, such as Riyadh and Harare. By contrast in other locations transport costs are much less, such as Beijing, Bangkok, Zaragoza, Phoenix, and, of course, coastal cities like Tripoli. After desalination at Jubail, Saudi Arabia, water is pumped 320 km inland to Riyadh. For coastal cities, desalination is increasingly viewed as a competitive choice.

In 2023, Israel was using desalination not only to provide fresh water for agriculture and human needs, but also to replenish the Sea of Galilee's water supply.

Not everyone is convinced that desalination is or will be economically viable or environmentally sustainable for the foreseeable future. Debbie Cook wrote in 2011 that desalination plants can be energy intensive and costly. Therefore, water-stressed regions might do better to focus on conservation or other water supply solutions than invest in desalination plants.

== Technologies ==
The most common desalination processes are distillation and reverse osmosis.

There are several methods. Each has advantages and disadvantages, but all are useful. The methods can be divided into membrane-based (e.g., reverse osmosis) and thermal-based (e.g., multi-stage flash distillation) methods. The traditional process of desalination is distillation, i.e., boiling and re-condensing seawater to leave salt and impurities behind.

There are currently two technologies with a large majority of the world's desalination capacity: multi-stage flash distillation and reverse osmosis.

=== Distillation ===
==== Solar distillation ====
Solar distillation mimics the natural water cycle, in which the sun heats sea water enough for evaporation to occur. After evaporation, the water vapor is condensed onto a cool surface. Solar energy heats and evaporates water, leaving behind salt and other minerals. A 2026 study reported that black metal panels etched with femtosecond lasers increase its light-absorbing and wicking action. The panels' active region pulls a thin layer of water across the surface, absorbs nearly all solar radiation, distills the water, and deposits the leftover salts and minerals on the panel's untreated "passive" region ensuring that the salt does not clog the active region, disrupting desalination. The sequestered solids, which include significant amounts of lithium can be extracted for other uses.

==== Natural evaporation ====
Water can evaporate through several other physical effects besides solar irradiation. These effects have been included in a multidisciplinary desalination methodology in the IBTS Greenhouse. The IBTS is an industrial desalination (power) plant on one side and a greenhouse operating with the natural water cycle (scaled down 1:10) on the other side. The various processes of evaporation and condensation are hosted in low-tech utilities, partly underground and the architectural shape of the building itself. This integrated biotectural system is most suitable for large scale desert greening as it has a km^{2} footprint for the water distillation and the same for landscape transformation in desert greening, respectively the regeneration of natural fresh water cycles.

==== Vacuum distillation ====
In vacuum distillation atmospheric pressure is reduced, thus lowering the temperature required to evaporate the water. Liquids boil when the vapor pressure equals the ambient pressure and vapor pressure increases with temperature. Effectively, liquids boil at a lower temperature, when the ambient atmospheric pressure is less than usual atmospheric pressure. Thus, because of the reduced pressure, low-temperature "waste" heat from electrical power generation or industrial processes can be employed.

==== Multi-stage flash distillation ====
Water is evaporated and separated from sea water through multi-stage flash distillation, which is a series of flash evaporations. Each subsequent flash process uses energy released from the condensation of the water vapor from the previous step.

==== Multiple-effect distillation ====
Multiple-effect distillation (MED) works through a series of steps called "effects". Incoming water is sprayed onto pipes which are then heated to generate steam. The steam is then used to heat the next batch of incoming sea water. To increase efficiency, the steam used to heat the sea water can be taken from nearby power plants. Although this method is the most thermodynamically efficient among methods powered by heat, a few limitations exist such as a max temperature and max number of effects.

==== Vapor-compression distillation ====
Vapor-compression evaporation involves using either a mechanical compressor or a jet stream to compress the vapor present above the liquid. The compressed vapor is then used to provide the heat needed for the evaporation of the rest of the sea water. Since this system only requires power, it is more cost effective if kept at a small scale.

==== Membrane distillation ====
Membrane distillation uses a temperature difference across a membrane to evaporate vapor from a brine solution and condense pure water on the colder side. The design of the membrane can have a significant effect on efficiency and durability. A study found that a membrane created via co-axial electrospinning of PVDF-HFP and silica aerogel was able to filter 99.99% of salt after continuous 30-day usage.

=== Osmosis ===
==== Reverse osmosis ====
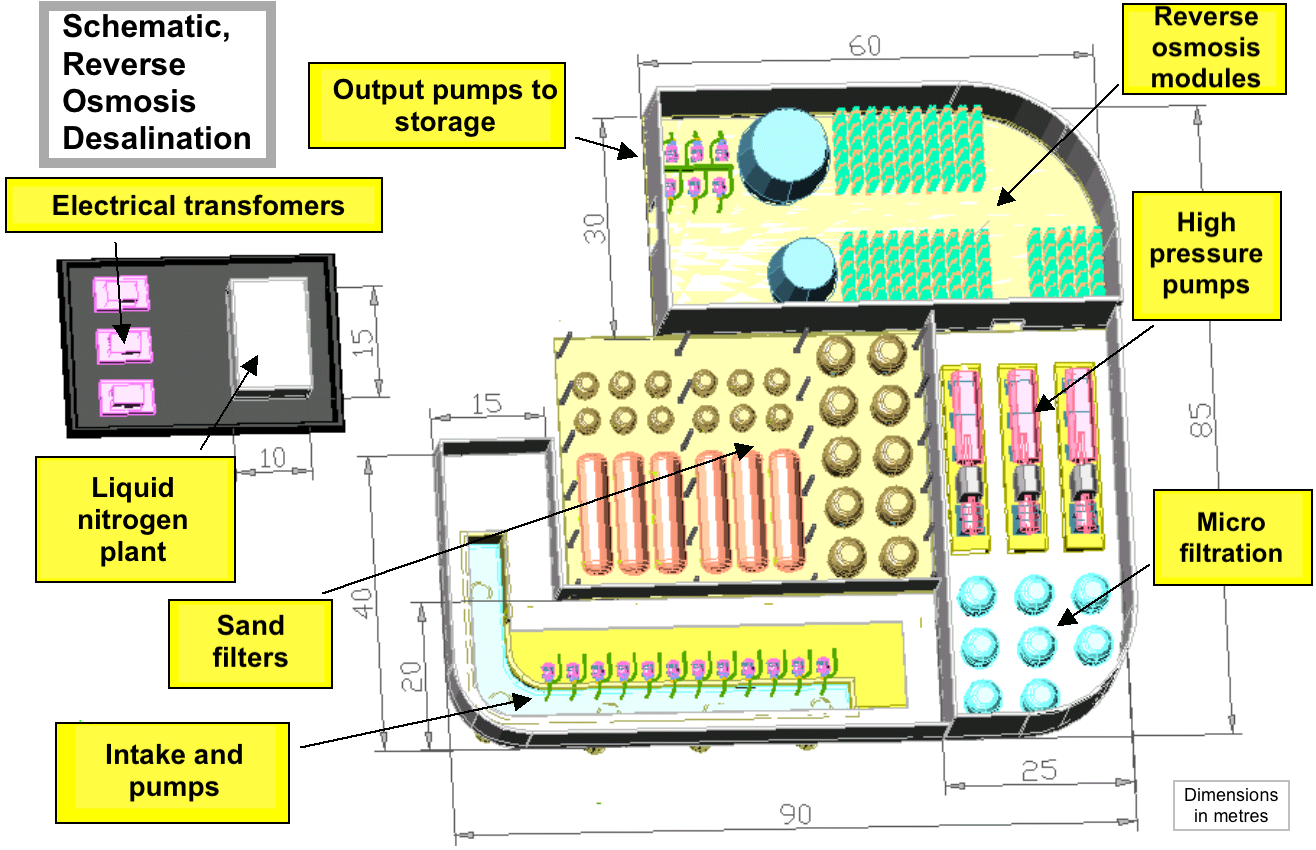
A schematic representation of a typical desalination plant using reverse osmosis. Hybrid desalination plants using liquid nitrogen freeze thaw in conjunction with reverse osmosis have been found to improve efficiency.

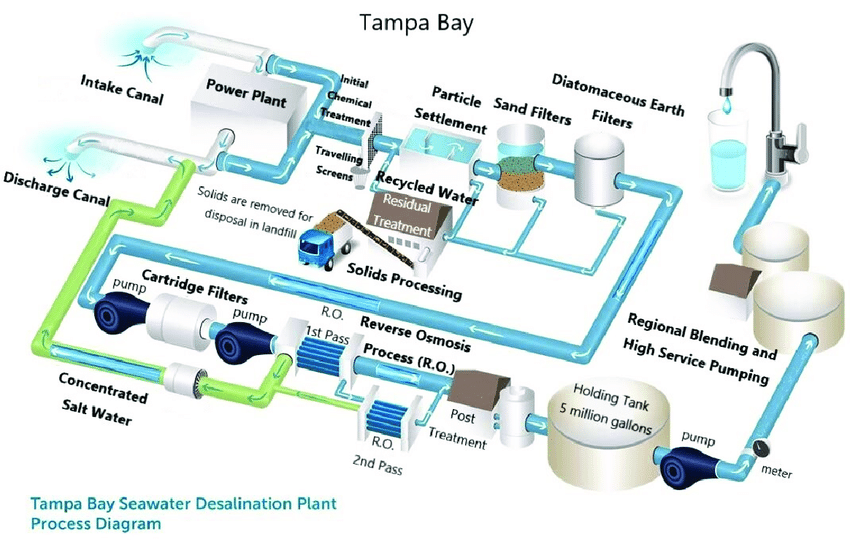
A reverse osmosis plant in Tampa Bay, Florida

The leading process for desalination in terms of installed capacity and yearly growth is reverse osmosis (RO). The RO membrane processes use semipermeable membranes and applied pressure (on the membrane feed side) to preferentially induce water permeation through the membrane while rejecting salts. Reverse osmosis plant membrane systems typically use less energy than thermal desalination processes.

Reverse osmosis uses a thin-film composite membrane, which comprises an ultra-thin, aromatic polyamide thin-film. This polyamide film gives the membrane its transport properties, whereas the remainder of the thin-film composite membrane provides mechanical support. The polyamide film is a dense, void-free polymer with a high surface area, allowing for its high water permeability. A 2021 study found that the water permeability is primarily governed by the internal nanoscale mass distribution of the polyamide active layer.

The reverse osmosis process requires maintenance. Factors interfere with efficiency: ionic contamination (calcium, magnesium, etc.), dissolved organic carbon (DOC), bacteria, viruses, colloids and insoluble particulates, biofouling and scaling, and membrane destruction in extreme cases. To mitigate damage, various pretreatment stages are introduced. Anti-scaling inhibitors include acids and other agents such as the organic polymers polyacrylamide and polymaleic acid, phosphonates and polyphosphates.

Inhibitors for fouling are biocides (as oxidants against bacteria and viruses), such as chlorine, ozone, sodium or calcium hypochlorite. At regular intervals, depending on the membrane contamination; fluctuating seawater conditions; or when prompted by monitoring processes, the membranes need to be cleaned, known as emergency or shock-flushing. Flushing is done with inhibitors in a fresh water solution and the system must go offline. This procedure is environmentally risky, since contaminated water is diverted into the ocean without treatment. Sensitive marine habitats can be irreversibly damaged.

Off-grid solar-powered desalination units use solar energy to fill a buffer tank on a hill with seawater. The reverse osmosis process receives its pressurized seawater feed in non-sunlight hours by gravity, resulting in sustainable drinking water production without the need for fossil fuels, an electricity grid or batteries. Nano-tubes are also used for the same function (i.e., Reverse Osmosis).

Deep sea reverse osmosis (DSRO) installs equipment on the seabed to force water through RO membranes using the ocean's naturally occurring water pressure. A 2021 study suggested DSRO could improve energy efficiency compared to standard RO by up to 50%. The concept of DSRO has long been known, but has only recently become feasible due to technological advances from the deep sea oil and gas industry, drawing early-stage investments in DSRO startups.

The reverse osmosis desalination plant in Tampa Bay currently provides around 95,000 m^{3} (25 million US gal) of drinkable water to the region every day, showing how effective and beneficial reverse osmosis plants can be in action.

==== Forward osmosis ====
Forward osmosis uses a semi-permeable membrane to effect separation of water from dissolved solutes. The driving force for this separation is an osmotic pressure gradient, such as a "draw" solution of high concentration.

=== Freeze–thaw ===
Freeze–thaw desalination (or freezing desalination) uses freezing to remove fresh water from salt water. Salt water is sprayed during freezing conditions into a pad where an ice-pile builds up. When seasonal conditions warm, naturally desalinated melt water is recovered. This technique relies on extended periods of natural sub-freezing conditions.

A different freeze–thaw method, not weather dependent and invented by Alexander Zarchin, freezes seawater in a vacuum. Under vacuum conditions the ice, desalinated, is melted and diverted for collection and the salt is collected.

=== Electrodialysis ===
Electrodialysis uses electric potential to move the salts through pairs of charged membranes, which trap salt in alternating channels. Several variances of electrodialysis exist such as conventional electrodialysis and electrodialysis reversal.

Electrodialysis can simultaneously remove salt and carbonic acid from seawater. Preliminary estimates suggest that the cost of such carbon removal can be paid for in large part if not entirely from the sale of the desalinated water produced as a byproduct.

=== Microbes ===
Microbial desalination cells are biological electrochemical systems that implements the use of electro-active bacteria to power desalination of water in situ, resourcing the natural anode and cathode gradient of the electro-active bacteria and thus creating an internal supercapacitor.

The use of microbial desalination cells is still in pilot and testing phases for major desalination plants to use. The first demonstration site was launched in Denia, Spain named the MIDES-project. The project has shown that using microbial desalination cells resulted in extremely low energy rates.

=== Wave-power ===
Wave powered desalination systems generally convert mechanical wave motion directly to hydraulic power for reverse osmosis. Such systems aim to maximize efficiency and reduce costs by avoiding conversion to electricity, minimizing excess pressurization above the osmotic pressure, and innovating on hydraulic and wave power components. One such approach is desalinating using submerged buoys, a wave power approach done by CETO and Oneka. Wave-powered desalination plants began operating by CETO on Garden Island in Western Australia in 2013 and in Perth in 2015, and Oneka has installations in Chile, Florida, California, and the Caribbean.

=== Wind-power ===
Wind energy can also be coupled to desalination. Similar to wave power, a direct conversion of mechanical energy to hydraulic power can reduce components and losses in powering reverse osmosis. Wind power has also been considered for coupling with thermal desalination technologies.

=== Thermophoresis ===
In April 2024, researchers published experimental results of desalination by thermophoresis. This technique, named thermodiffusive desalination, passes saline water through a channel that is exposed to a temperature gradient, orthogonal to the fluid flow. Due to thermophoresis, species migrate under this temperature gradient. Researchers then separated the water into fractions and could achieve a NaCl concentration drop of 3.3% after three passes through the channel with a recovery rate (the desalination stream volume versus the original feedwater volume) of 12.5%. In 2025, the researchers experimentally demonstrated the same process through a Burgers cascade, previously shown to enhance thermodiffusive separation in gases. With the device of the same footprint area as the single channel device in 2024, they achieved improvements in concentration drops and recovery rates. They identified the process to be more efficient for treating hypersaline brine, impyling opportunities in brine treatment (minimal- or zero- liquid discharge), resource recovery from brine.

== Design aspects ==
=== Energy consumption ===
The desalination process's energy consumption depends on the water's salinity. Brackish water desalination requires less energy than seawater desalination.

The energy intensity of seawater desalination has improved: It is now about 3 kWh/m^{3} (in 2018), down by a factor of 10 from 20-30 kWh/m^{3} in 1970. This is similar to the energy consumption of other freshwater supplies transported over large distances, but much higher than local fresh water supplies that use 0.2 kWh/m^{3} or less.

A minimum energy consumption for seawater desalination of around 1 kWh/m^{3} has been determined, excluding prefiltering and intake/outfall pumping. Under 2 kWh/m^{3} has been achieved with reverse osmosis membrane technology, leaving limited scope for further energy reduction, as the reverse osmosis energy consumption in the 1970s was 16 kWh/m^{3}.

Supplying all US domestic water by desalination would increase domestic energy consumption by around 10%, about the amount of energy used by domestic refrigerators. Domestic consumption is a relatively small fraction of the total water usage.

Energy consumption of seawater desalination methods (kWh/m^{3})
Desalination Method ⇨	Multi-stage Flash "MSF"	Multi-Effect Distillation "MED"	Mechanical Vapor Compression "MVC"	Reverse Osmosis "RO"
Energy ⇩	Multi-stage Flash "MSF"	Multi-Effect Distillation "MED"	Mechanical Vapor Compression "MVC"	Reverse Osmosis "RO"
Electrical energy	4–6	1.5–2.5	7–12	3–5.5
Thermal energy	50–110	60–110	none	none
Electrical equivalent of thermal energy	9.5–19.5	5–8.5	none	none
Total equivalent electrical energy	13.5–25.5	6.5–11	7–12	3–5.5

Note: "Electrical equivalent" refers to the amount of electrical energy that could be generated using a given quantity of thermal energy and an appropriate turbine generator. These calculations do not include the energy required to construct or refurbish items consumed.

Given the energy-intensive nature of desalination and the associated economic and environmental costs, desalination is generally considered a last resort after water conservation. But this is changing as prices continue to fall.

=== Cogeneration ===
Cogeneration is generating useful heat energy and electricity from a single process. Cogeneration can provide usable heat for desalination in an integrated, or "dual-purpose", facility where a power plant provides the energy for desalination. Alternatively, the facility's energy production may be dedicated to the production of potable water (a stand-alone facility), or excess energy may be produced and incorporated into the energy grid. Cogeneration takes various forms, and theoretically any form of energy production could be used. However, the majority of current and planned cogeneration desalination plants use either fossil fuels or nuclear power as their source of energy. Most plants are located in the Middle East or North Africa, which use their petroleum resources to offset limited water resources. The advantage of dual-purpose facilities is they can be more efficient in energy consumption, thus making desalination more viable.

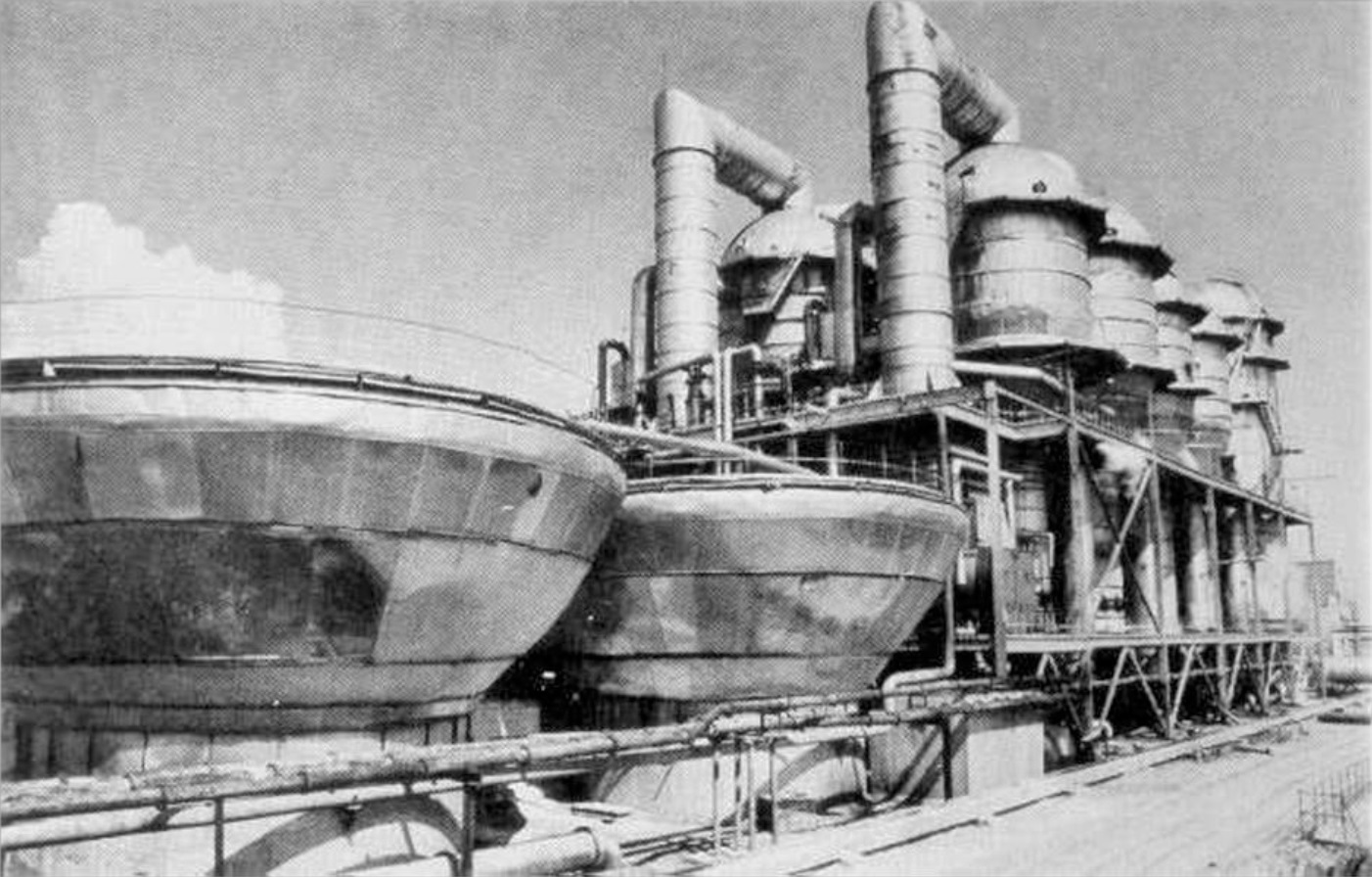
The Shevchenko BN-350, a former nuclear-heated desalination unit in Kazakhstan

The current trend in dual-purpose facilities is hybrid configurations, in which the permeate from reverse osmosis desalination is mixed with distillate from thermal desalination. Basically, two or more desalination processes are combined along with power production. Such facilities have been implemented in Saudi Arabia at Jeddah and Yanbu.

A typical supercarrier in the US military is capable of using nuclear power to desalinate 1,500 m^{3} (0.40 million US gal) of water per day.

=== Alternatives to desalination ===
Increased water conservation and efficiency remain the most cost-effective approaches in areas with a large potential to improve the efficiency of water use practices. Wastewater reclamation provides multiple benefits over desalination of saline water, although it typically uses desalination membranes. Urban runoff and storm water capture also provide benefits in treating, restoring and recharging groundwater.

A proposed alternative to desalination in the American Southwest is the commercial importation of bulk water from water-rich areas either by oil tankers converted to water carriers, or pipelines. The idea is politically unpopular in Canada, where governments imposed trade barriers to bulk water exports as a result of a North American Free Trade Agreement (NAFTA) claim.

The California Department of Water Resources and the California State Water Resources Control Board submitted a report to the state legislature recommending that urban water suppliers achieve an indoor water use efficiency standard of 210 litres (55 US gallons) per capita per day by 2023, declining to 180 litres (47 US gallons) per day by 2025, and 160 litres (42 US gallons) by 2030 and beyond.

== Costs ==
Factors that determine the costs for desalination include capacity and type of facility, location, feed water, labor, energy, financing, and concentrate disposal. Costs of desalinating sea water (infrastructure, energy, and maintenance) are generally higher than fresh water from rivers or groundwater, water recycling, and water conservation, but alternatives are only sometimes available. Desalination costs in 2013 ranged from US$0.45 to US$1.00/m^{3}. More than half of the cost comes directly from energy costs, and since energy prices are very volatile, actual costs can vary substantially.

The cost of untreated fresh water in the developing world can reach US$5/cubic metre.

Since 1975, desalination technology has seen significant advancements, decreasing the average cost of producing one cubic meter of freshwater from seawater from $1.10 in 2000 to approximately $0.50 today. Improved desalination efficiency is a primary factor contributing to this reduction. Energy consumption remains a significant cost component, accounting for up to half the total cost of the desalination process.

Desalination can significantly burden energy grids, especially in regions with limited energy resources. For instance, in the island nation of Cyprus, desalination accounts for approximately 5% of the country's total power consumption.

The global desalination market was valued at $20 billion in 2023. With growing populations in arid coastal regions, this market is projected to double by 2032. In 2023, global desalination capacity reached 99 million cubic meters per day, a significant increase from 27 million cubic meters per day in 2003.

Cost Comparison of Desalination Methods
Method	Cost (US$/m^{3})
Passive solar (30.42% energy efficient)	34
Passive solar (improved single-slope, India)	24
Passive solar (improved double slope, India)	7
Multi Stage Flash (MSF)	< 1
Reverse Osmosis (Concentrated solar power)	0.80
Reverse Osmosis (Photovoltaic power)	0.825

Average water consumption and cost of supply by seawater desalination at US$1 per cubic metre (±50%)
Area	Consumption Liter/person/day	Desalinated Water Cost US$/person/day
US	378	0.38
Europe	189	0.19
Africa	57	0.06
UN recommended minimum	49	0.05

Desalination stills control pressure, temperature and brine concentrations to optimize efficiency. Nuclear-powered desalination might be economical on a large scale.

In 2014, the Israeli facilities of Hadera, Palmahim, Ashkelon, and Sorek were desalinizing water for less than US$0.40 per cubic meter. As of 2006, Singapore was desalinating water for US$0.49 per cubic meter. In 2025, a desalination plant was opened in Rizhao, China, with a reported desalination cost of RMB 2 (US$0.28) per cubic meter powered by waste heat.

== Environmental concerns ==
=== Intake ===
In the United States, cooling water intake structures are regulated by the Environmental Protection Agency (EPA). These structures can have the same impacts on the environment as desalination facility intakes. According to EPA, water intake structures cause adverse environmental impact by sucking fish and shellfish or their eggs into an industrial system. There, the organisms may be killed or injured by heat, physical stress, or chemicals. Larger organisms may be killed or injured when they become trapped against screens at the front of an intake structure. Alternative intake types that mitigate these impacts include beach wells, but they require more energy and higher costs.

The Kwinana Desalination Plant opened in the Australian city of Perth, in 2007. Water there and at Queensland's Gold Coast Desalination Plant and Sydney's Kurnell Desalination Plant is withdrawn at 0.1 m/s (0.33 ft/s), which is slow enough to let fish escape. The plant provides nearly 140,000 m^{3} (4,900,000 cu ft) of clean water per day.

In 2025, Corpus Christi, Texas cancelled a large desalination project due to controversy over environmental and financial concerns.

=== Outflow ===
Desalination processes produce large quantities of brine, possibly at above ambient temperature, and contain residues of pretreatment and cleaning chemicals, their reaction byproducts and heavy metals due to corrosion (especially in thermal-based plants). Chemical pretreatment and cleaning are a necessity in most desalination plants, which typically includes prevention of biofouling, scaling, foaming and corrosion in thermal plants, and of biofouling, suspended solids and scale deposits in membrane plants.

To limit the environmental impact of returning the brine to the ocean, it can be diluted with another stream of water entering the ocean, such as the outfall of a wastewater treatment or power plant. With medium to large power plant and desalination plants, the power plant's cooling water flow is likely to be several times larger than that of the desalination plant, reducing the salinity of the combination. Another method to dilute the brine is to mix it via a diffuser in a mixing zone. For example, once a pipeline containing the brine reaches the sea floor, it can split into many branches, each releasing brine gradually through small holes along its length. Mixing can be combined with power plant or wastewater plant dilution. Zero liquid discharge systems can be adopted to treat brine before disposal.

According to recent global assessments, brine discharge from desalination plants now exceeds the volume of freshwater produced totaling to around 142 million m^{3}/day. These results are increasing concerns about increases in marine salinity, ecosystem disruption, and the environmental footprint of the expansion of desalination.

Newer studies have raised concerns about the effects of microplastics and chemical residues that are introduced during the desalination process. Pretreatment chemicals, antiscalants, and cleaning agents can contribute to trace pollutants in effluent streams if not properly managed. While these impacts are generally smaller than brine related issues, they show an important of upgrading environmental monitoring and adoption cleaner pretreatment technologies.

Another possibility is making the desalination plant movable, thus preventing brine from building up at a single location. Some such movable (ship-connected) desalination plants have been constructed.

Brine is denser than seawater and therefore sinks to the ocean bottom and can damage the ecosystem. Brine plumes have been seen to diminish over time to a diluted concentration, resulting in little to no effect on the surrounding environment. However studies have shown the dilution can be misleading due to the depth at which it occurred. If dilution is observed in summer, this may be due to a seasonal thermocline event preventing concentrated brine from sinking to the sea floor. This has the potential to disrupt the waters above the sea floor. Brine dispersal from desalination plants has been seen to travel several kilometers away, potentially harming distant ecosystems. Careful reintroduction with appropriate measures and environmental studies can minimize this problem.

=== Energy use ===
The energy demand for desalination in the Middle East, driven by severe water scarcity, is expected to double by 2030. Currently, this process primarily uses fossil fuels, comprising over 95% of its energy source. In 2023, desalination consumed nearly half of the residential sector's energy in the region. The majority of drinking water consumed in Israel, Saudi Arabia, Oman and Kuwait is produced by desalination.

=== Other issues ===
Due to the nature of the process, there is a need to place the plants on approximately 25 acres (10 ha) of land on or near the shoreline. In the case of a plant built inland, pipes have to be laid into the ground to allow for easy intake and outtake. However, once the pipes are laid into the ground, they have a possibility of leaking into and contaminating nearby aquifers. Aside from environmental risks, the noise generated by certain types of desalination plants can be loud.

== Health aspects ==
=== Iodine deficiency ===
Desalination removes iodine from water and could increase the risk of iodine deficiency disorders. Israeli researchers claimed a possible link between seawater desalination and iodine deficiency, finding iodine deficits among adults exposed to iodine-poor water concurrently with an increasing proportion of their area's drinking water from seawater reverse osmosis (SWRO). They later found probable iodine deficiency disorders in a population reliant on desalinated seawater.

In 2017, a possible link of heavy desalinated water use and national iodine deficiency was suggested by Israeli researchers. They found a high burden of iodine deficiency in the general population of Israel: 62% of school-age children and 85% of pregnant women fall below the WHO's adequacy range. They also pointed out the national reliance on iodine-depleted desalinated water, the absence of a universal salt iodization program and reports of increased use of thyroid medication in Israel as a possible reasons that the population's iodine intake is low. In the year that the survey was conducted, the amount of water produced from the desalination plants constitutes about 50% of the quantity of fresh water supplied for all needs and about 80% of the water supplied for domestic and industrial needs in Israel.

== Experimental techniques ==
Other desalination techniques include:

=== Waste heat ===
Thermally-driven desalination technologies are frequently suggested for use with low-temperature waste heat sources, as the low temperatures are not useful for process heat needed in many industrial processes, but ideal for the lower temperatures needed for desalination. Such pairing with waste heat can even improve electrical process: Diesel generators commonly provide electricity in remote areas. About 40–50% of the energy output is low-grade heat that leaves the engine via the exhaust.

Connecting a thermal desalination technology such as membrane distillation system to the diesel engine exhaust repurposes this low-grade heat for desalination. The system actively cools the diesel generator, improving its efficiency and increasing its electricity output. This results in an energy-neutral desalination solution. An example plant was commissioned by Dutch company Aquaver in March 2014 for Gulhi, Maldives.

=== Low-temperature thermal ===
Originally stemming from ocean thermal energy conversion research, low-temperature thermal desalination (LTTD) takes advantage of water boiling at low pressure, even at ambient temperature. The system uses pumps to create a low-pressure, low-temperature environment in which water boils at a temperature gradient of 8–10 °C (14–18 °F) between two volumes of water. Cool ocean water is supplied from depths of up to 600 m (2,000 ft). This water is pumped through coils to condense the water vapor. The resulting condensate is purified water. LTTD may take advantage of the temperature gradient available at power plants, where large quantities of warm wastewater are discharged from the plant, reducing the energy input needed to create a temperature gradient.

Experiments were conducted in the US and Japan to test the approach. In Japan, a spray-flash evaporation system was tested by Saga University. In Hawaii, the National Energy Laboratory tested an open-cycle OTEC plant with fresh water and power production using a temperature difference of 20 °C (36 °F) between surface water and water at a depth of around 500 m (1,600 ft). LTTD was studied by India's National Institute of Ocean Technology (NIOT) in 2004. Their first LTTD plant opened in 2005 at Kavaratti in the Lakshadweep islands. The plant's capacity is 100,000 L (22,000 imp gal; 26,000 US gal)/day, at a capital cost of INR 50 million (€922,000). The plant uses deep water at a temperature of 10 to 12 °C (50 to 54 °F).

In 2007, NIOT opened an experimental, floating LTTD plant off the coast of Chennai, with a capacity of 1,000,000 L (220,000 imp gal; 260,000 US gal)/day. A smaller plant was established in 2009 at the North Chennai Thermal Power Station to prove the LTTD application where power plant cooling water is available.

=== Thermoionic process ===
In October 2009, Saltworks Technologies announced a process that uses solar or other thermal heat to drive an ionic current that removes all sodium and chlorine ions from the water using ion-exchange membranes.

In Jacksonville, Florida, a team led by Arctic Solar designed a solar-thermal desalination system that uses a thermal responsive solvent to draw in water. Arctic Solar then designed an external compound parabolic concentrator to heat the solvent and separate it from the generated fresh water. The company will test their ideas at Southern Company's Water Research and Conservation Center in Georgia.

=== Evaporation and condensation for crops ===
The seawater greenhouse uses natural evaporation and condensation processes inside a greenhouse powered by solar energy to grow crops in arid coastal land.

=== Ion concentration polarisation ===
In 2022, using a technique that used multiple stages of ion concentration polarisation (ICP) followed by a single stage of electrodialysis, researchers from MIT manage to create a filterless portable desalination unit, capable of removing both dissolved salts and suspended solids. Designed for use by non-experts in remote areas or natural disasters, as well as on military operations, the prototype is the size of a suitcase, measuring 42 × 33.5 × 19 cm^{3} and weighing 9.25 kg.

The process is fully automated, notifying the user when the water is safe to drink, and can be controlled by a single button or smartphone app. As it does not require a high pressure pump the process is highly energy efficient, consuming only 20 watt-hours per liter of drinking water produced, making it capable of being powered by common portable solar panels. Using a filterless design at low pressures or replaceable filters significantly reduces maintenance requirements, while the device itself is self cleaning.

However, the device is limited to producing 0.33 litres per minute (5.2 gal/h) of drinking water. There are also concerns that fouling will impact the long-term reliability, especially in water with high turbidity. The researchers are working to increase the efficiency and production rate with the intent to commercialise the product in the future, however a significant limitation is the reliance on expensive materials in the current design.

=== Other approaches ===
Adsorption-based desalination (AD) relies on the moisture absorption properties of certain materials such as silica gel.

==== Forward osmosis ====
One process was commercialized by Modern Water PLC using forward osmosis, with a number of plants reported to be in operation.

==== Hydrogel based desalination ====
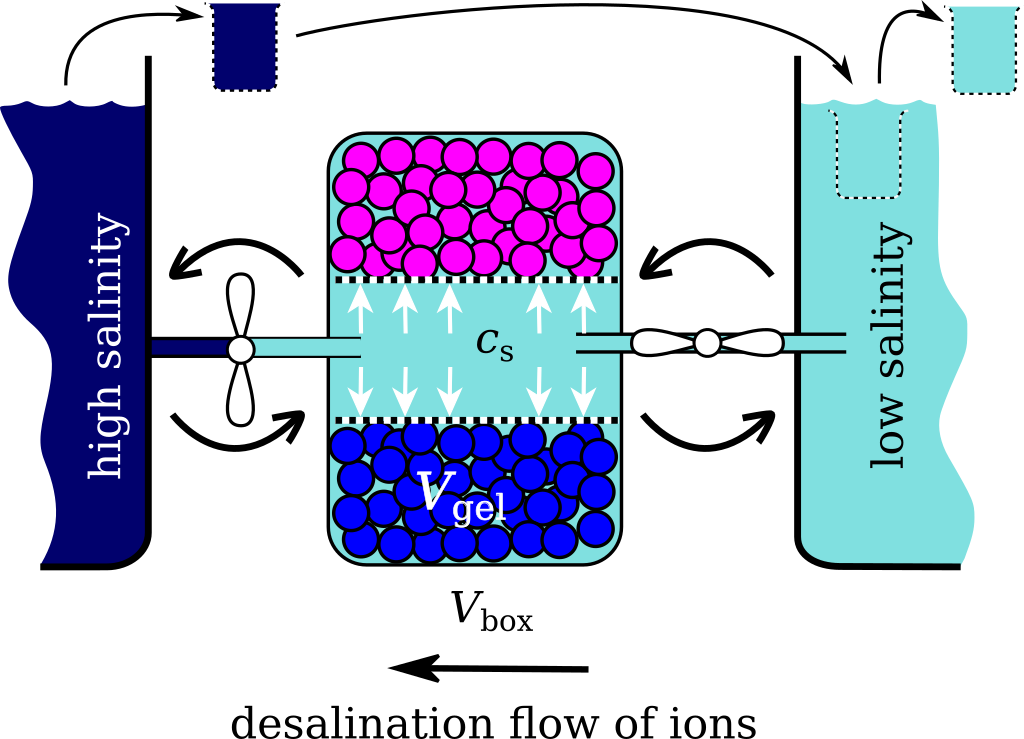
Scheme of the desalination machine: the desalination box of volume $V_{box}$ contains a gel of volume $V_{gel}$ which is separated by a sieve from the outer solution volume $V_{out} = V_{box} - V_{gel}$. The box is connected to two big tanks with high and low salinity by two taps which can be opened and closed as desired. The chain of buckets expresses the fresh water consumption followed by refilling the low-salinity reservoir by salt water.

The idea of the method is in the fact that when the hydrogel is put into contact with aqueous salt solution, it swells absorbing a solution with the ion composition different from the original one. This solution can be easily squeezed out from the gel by means of sieve or microfiltration membrane. The compression of the gel in closed system lead to change in salt concentration, whereas the compression in open system, while the gel is exchanging ions with bulk, lead to the change in the number of ions.

The consequence of the compression and swelling in open and closed system conditions mimics the reverse Carnot Cycle of refrigerator machine. The only difference is that instead of heat this cycle transfers salt ions from the bulk of low salinity to a bulk of high salinity. Similarly to the Carnot cycle this cycle is fully reversible, so can in principle work with an ideal thermodynamic efficiency.

Because the method is free from the use of osmotic membranes it can compete with reverse osmosis method. In addition, unlike the reverse osmosis, the approach is not sensitive to the quality of feed water and its seasonal changes, and allows the production of water of any desired concentration.

==== Small-scale solar ====
The United States, France and the United Arab Emirates are working to develop practical solar desalination. AquaDania's WaterStillar has been installed at Dahab, Egypt, and in Playa del Carmen, Mexico. In this approach, a solar thermal collector measuring two square metres can distill from 40 to 60 liters per day from any local water source – five times more than conventional stills. It eliminates the need for plastic PET bottles or energy-consuming water transport.

=== Energy-based desalination ===
Integrating renewable energy into desalination processes is a key strategy to relieve the high demand for energy and environmental impact of conventional desalination. While most of today's desalination plants are powered mainly by fossil fuels, some use solar, wind, geothermal and wave. These systems are especially appealing in sparsely populated and remote regions in which grid access is lacking, but renewable resources abound.

==== Solar-powered desalination ====
There are two types of solar-powered desalination; solar thermal-based and PV-based. Solar thermal desalination uses concentrated solar power (CSP) or solar collectors to produce heat for applications like multi-effect distillation (MED), multi-stage flash distillation (MSF) or membrane distillation (MD). In comparison, PV-driven systems use sunlight to produce energy to run reverse osmosis (RO) or electrodialysis units. Phase change materials, nanofluids and modern thermal storage technologies have been widely utilized to improve efficiency of small-scale solar stills and hybrid systems (Ghaffour, 2016). For example, modular solar distillation devices have been introduced in coastal villages in North Africa and the Middle East, delivering up to 5,000 liters of clean water per day with no greenhouse gas (GHG) emissions (IRENA, 2022).

==== Systems powered by wind and hybrid ====
Wind-driven desalination employs mechanical or electrical power from wind turbines to operate RO units or pressurize feedwater. Wind–solar hybrid systems are under test under different weather conditions to avoid erratic conditions. In Spain, an integrated wind–PV desalination facility has been in the Canary Islands, and has seen a 40% reduction in operating expenses when compared to grid-based desalination systems due to the deployment in 2019 (Al-Karaghouli & Kazmerski, 2013).

==== Application of geothermal and waste heat treatment ====
Geothermal resources at low temperatures and industrial waste heat can feed thermal energy to desalination systems to enhance the efficiency of desalination systems for water recovery and production processes. Geothermal desalination has been introduced in Iceland and Turkey where subsurface heat is used to power MED or low temperature distillation units (Narayan, 2019). Also, waste heat from diesel generators or manufacturing plants or industrial sources can be part of a membrane distillation system that is also stored in the processing process on site that is inherently energy free (Gude, 2016).

==== Technological innovations ====
Materials science is also transforming the paradigms of renewables. Nanostructured membranes, with enhanced permeability and salt rejection to overcome the high energy demand for solar-driven RO, have been proposed (Shen et al., 2021). Furthermore, solar-driven capacitive deionization (CDI) or photothermal membrane distillation employing sunlight-absorbing materials for locally heating at the membrane surface, significantly enhancing vapor flux but reducing fouling, is being investigated (Shatat et al., 2014).

==== Economic and environmental implications ====
The capital costs which renewable desalination requires are relatively high but the energy production is variable. Solar and wind powered desalination systems now operate at commercial scale in regions such as the Middle East, Australia and costal United States. But life-cycle analysis finds that the environmental footprint of solar- or wind-powered desalination systems is much lower than that of fossil-based processes. According to IRENA (2022), compared to conventional methods, renewable desalination is capable of lowering carbon emissions by up to 80%. In several coastal regions, the levelized price of water from PV–RO hybrid systems is falling below $1 per cubic meter and approaching grid-driven desalination.

==== Applications in social and regional contexts ====
In humanitarian and off-grid applications, renewable desalination is an important tool. Portable solar desalination units are already being developed for disaster relief and military use. They will get them drinking water from either seawater or brackish water and would require very little maintenance. National Institute of Ocean Technology (NIOT) has successfully started solar-assisted desalination units in island territories in India, while pilot projects in California use concentrated solar energy to treat agricultural runoff (United Nations, 2023).

==== Future outlook ====
The world as a whole demonstrates a huge potential of renewable desalination as countries work towards sustainable solutions to overcome water scarcity. As new technologies such as energy storage, Artificial Intelligence for process optimization, and graphene membranes are developed, it is anticipated that even better efficiency will be achieved. While the technology of desalination continues to evolve, the International Desalination Association estimates a 20% new desalination capacity should come from renewable sources by 2035 (IRENA, 2022). In spite of a series of challenges, such as cost, intermittency, and the need to scale the implementation of renewables, integrating renewables is viewed as one of the most viable approaches to sustainable water harvesting in the new century.

==== Passarell ====
The Passarell process uses reduced atmospheric pressure rather than heat to drive evaporative desalination. The pure water vapor generated by distillation is then compressed and condensed using an advanced compressor. The compression process improves distillation efficiency by creating the reduced pressure in the evaporation chamber. The compressor centrifuges the pure water vapor after it is drawn through a demister (removing residual impurities) causing it to compress against tubes in the collection chamber.

The compression of the vapor increases its temperature. The heat is transferred to the input water falling in the tubes, vaporizing the water in the tubes. Water vapor condenses on the outside of the tubes as product water. By combining several physical processes, Passarell enables most of the system's energy to be recycled through its evaporation, demisting, vapor compression, condensation, and water movement processes.

==== Geothermal ====
Geothermal energy can drive desalination. In most locations, geothermal desalination beats using scarce groundwater or surface water, environmentally and economically.

==== Nanotechnology ====
Nanotube membranes of higher permeability than current generation of membranes may lead to eventual reduction in the footprint of RO desalination plants. It has also been suggested that the use of such membranes will lead to reduction in the energy needed for desalination.

Hermetic, sulphonated nano-composite membranes have shown to be capable of removing various contaminants to the parts per billion level, and have little or no susceptibility to high salt concentration levels.

==== Biomimesis ====
Biomimetic membranes are another approach.

==== Electrochemical ====
In 2008, Siemens Water Technologies announced technology that applied electric fields to desalinate one cubic meter of water while using only a purported 1.5 kWh of energy. If accurate, this process would consume one-half the energy of other processes. As of 2012 a demonstration plant was operating in Singapore. Researchers at the University of Texas at Austin and the University of Marburg are developing more efficient methods of electrochemically mediated seawater desalination.

==== Electrokinetic shocks ====
A process employing electrokinetic shock waves can be used to accomplish membraneless desalination at ambient temperature and pressure. In this process, anions and cations in salt water are exchanged for carbonate anions and calcium cations, respectively using electrokinetic shockwaves. Calcium and carbonate ions react to form calcium carbonate, which precipitates, leaving fresh water. The theoretical energy efficiency of this method is on par with electrodialysis and reverse osmosis.

==== Temperature swing solvent extraction ====
Temperature Swing Solvent Extraction (TSSE) uses a solvent instead of a membrane or high temperatures.

Solvent extraction is a common technique in chemical engineering. It can be activated by low-grade heat (less than 70 °C (158 °F), which may not require active heating. In a study, TSSE removed up to 98.4 percent of the salt in brine. A solvent whose solubility varies with temperature is added to saltwater. At room temperature the solvent draws water molecules away from the salt. The water-laden solvent is then heated, causing the solvent to release the now salt-free water.

It can desalinate extremely salty brine up to seven times as salty as the ocean. For comparison, the current methods can only handle brine twice as salty.

==== Wave energy ====
A small-scale offshore system uses wave energy to desalinate 30–50 m^{3}/day. The system operates with no external power, and is constructed of recycled plastic bottles.

== In wartime ==
Particularly in water-stressed regions such as the Middle East, desalination plants are vital civilian infrastructure that are protected under the laws of war, such as Article 54 of Protocol I to the Geneva Conventions and the Berlin Rules on Water Resources. Deliberate attacks on desalination infrastructure have been described as war crimes.

== Use around the world ==
Trade Arabia claims Saudi Arabia is producing 7.9 million cubic meters of desalinated water daily, or 22% of world total, as of 2021 year's end.

- Perth began operating a reverse osmosis seawater desalination plant in 2006. The Perth desalination plant is powered partially by renewable energy from the Emu Downs Wind Farm.
- A desalination plant now operates in Sydney, and the Wonthaggi desalination plant was under construction in Wonthaggi, Victoria. A wind farm at Bungendore in New South Wales was purpose-built to generate enough renewable energy to offset the Sydney plant's energy use, mitigating concerns about harmful greenhouse gas emissions.
- A January 17, 2008, article in The Wall Street Journal stated, "In November, Connecticut-based Poseidon Resources Corp. won a key regulatory approval to build the $300 million water-desalination plant in Carlsbad, north of San Diego. The facility would produce 190,000 cubic metres of drinking water per day, enough to supply about 100,000 homes. As of June 2012, the cost for the desalinated water had risen to $1.888 per cubic metre ($2,329 per acre-foot). Each $1,000 per acre-foot works out to $3.06 for 1,000 gallons, or $0.81/m^{3}.

As new technological innovations continue to reduce the capital cost of desalination, more countries are building desalination plants as a small element in addressing their water scarcity problems.

- Israel desalinizes water for a cost of 53 cents per cubic meter
- Singapore desalinizes water for 49 cents per cubic meter and also treats sewage with reverse osmosis for industrial and potable use (NEWater).
- China and India, the world's two most populous countries, are turning to desalination to provide a small part of their water needs
- In 2007 Pakistan announced plans to use desalination
- All Australian capital cities (except Canberra, Darwin, Northern Territory and Hobart) are either in the process of building desalination plants, or are already using them. In late 2011, Melbourne will begin using Australia's largest desalination plant, the Wonthaggi desalination plant to raise low reservoir levels.
- In 2007 Bermuda signed a contract to purchase a desalination plant
- Before 2015, the largest desalination plant in the United States was at Tampa Bay, Florida, which began desalinizing 95,000 m^{3} (25 million US gal) of water per day in December 2007. In the United States, the cost of desalination is $0.81 per cubic metre or $0.0031 per US gallon. In the United States, California, Arizona, Texas, and Florida use desalination for a very small part of their water supply. Since 2015, the Claude "Bud" Lewis Carlsbad Desalination Plant has been producing 190,000 m^{3} (50 million US gal) of drinking water daily.
- After being desalinized at Jubail, Saudi Arabia, water is pumped 200 miles (320 km) inland though a pipeline to the capital city of Riyadh.
- Texas has over 370 miles (600 km) of coastline and may be a major hub for desalination in the future, currently it is a controversial topic due to cost and environmental concerns.

As of 2008, "World-wide, 13,080 desalination plants produce more than 12 billion gallons of water a day, according to the International Desalination Association." An estimate in 2009 found that the worldwide desalinated water supply would triple between 2008 and 2020.

One of the world's largest desalination hubs is the Jebel Ali Power Generation and Water Production Complex in the United Arab Emirates. It is a site featuring multiple plants using different desalination technologies and is capable of producing 2.2 million cubic meters of water per day.

A typical aircraft carrier in the U.S. military uses nuclear power to desalinize 1,500 cubic metres (400,000 US gal) of water per day.

== In nature ==
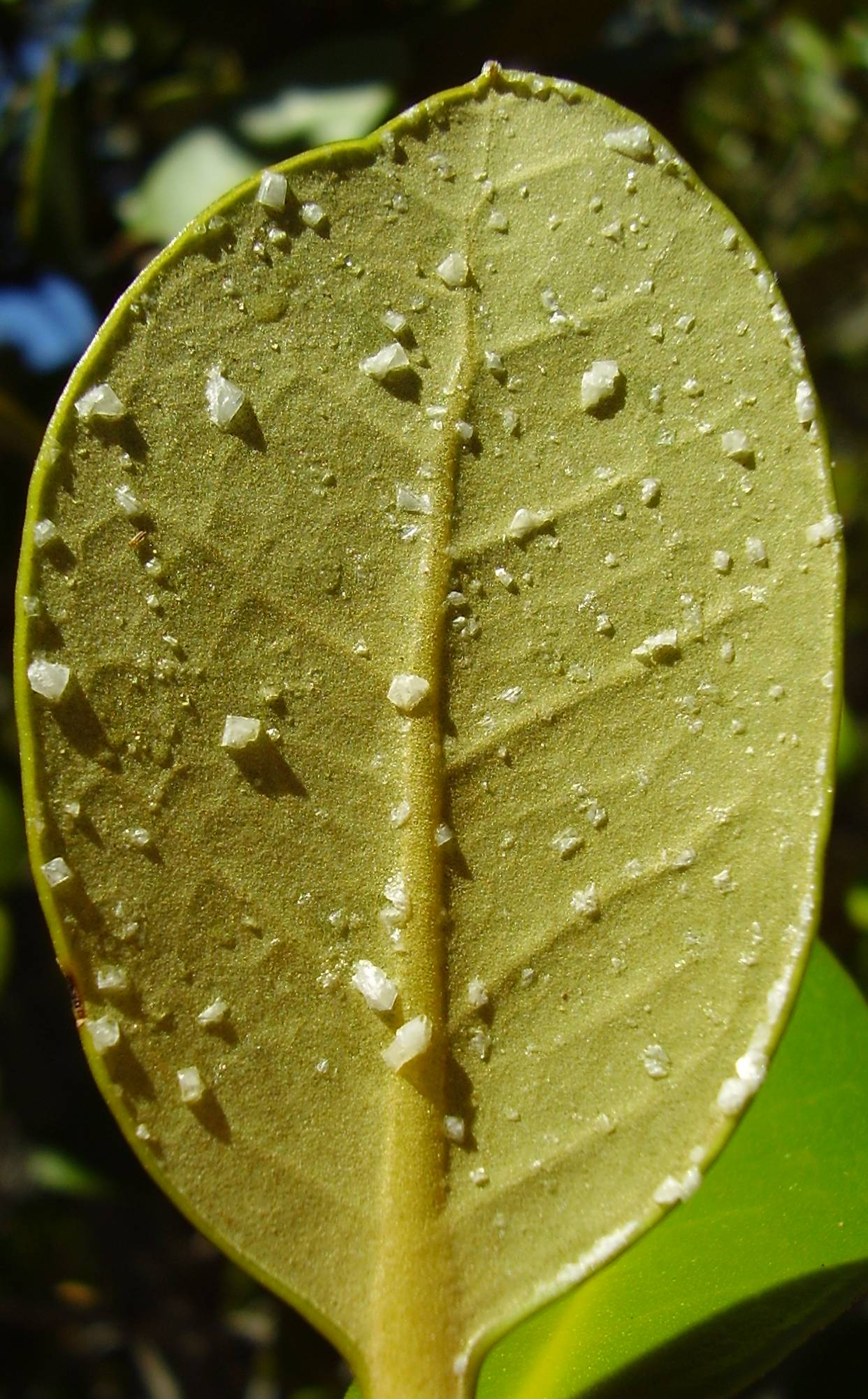
Mangrove leaf with salt crystals

Evaporation of water over the oceans in the water cycle is a natural desalination process.

The formation of sea ice produces ice with little salt, much lower than in seawater.

Seabirds distill seawater using countercurrent exchange in a gland with a rete mirabile. The gland secretes highly concentrated brine stored near the nostrils above the beak. The bird then "sneezes" the brine out. As freshwater is not usually available in their environments, some seabirds, such as pelicans, petrels, albatrosses, gulls and terns, possess this gland, which allows them to drink the salty water from their environments while they are far from land.

Mangrove trees grow in seawater; they secrete salt by trapping it in parts of the root, which are then eaten by animals (usually crabs). Additional salt is removed by storing it in leaves that fall off. Some types of mangroves have glands on their leaves, which work in a similar way to the seabird desalination gland. Salt is extracted to the leaf exterior as small crystals, which then fall off the leaf.

Willow trees and reeds absorb salt and other contaminants, effectively desalinating the water. This is used in artificial constructed wetlands, for treating sewage.

== Society and culture ==
Despite the issues associated with desalination processes, public support for its development can be very high. One survey of a Southern California community saw 71.9% of all respondents being in support of desalination plant development in their community. In many cases, high freshwater scarcity corresponds to higher public support for desalination development whereas areas with low water scarcity tend to have less public support for its development.

== See also ==
- Atmospheric water generator
- Dewvaporation
- Flexible barge
- Metal–organic framework
- Peak water
- Pumpable ice technology
- Soil desalination model
- Soil salinity
